= Schwab Foundation for Social Entrepreneurship =

Swiss not-for-profit organization

The Schwab Foundation for Social Entrepreneurship is a Swiss not-for-profit organization founded in 1998 that provides platforms at regional, national, and global levels to promote social entrepreneurship. The foundation is under the legal supervision of the Swiss Federal Government. Its headquarters are in Geneva, Switzerland. Each year, it selects 20–25 social entrepreneurs through a global "Social Entrepreneur of the Year" competition.

Over 950 million people in 190 countries are impacted each year by more than 500 social entrepreneurs it has backed.

== History ==
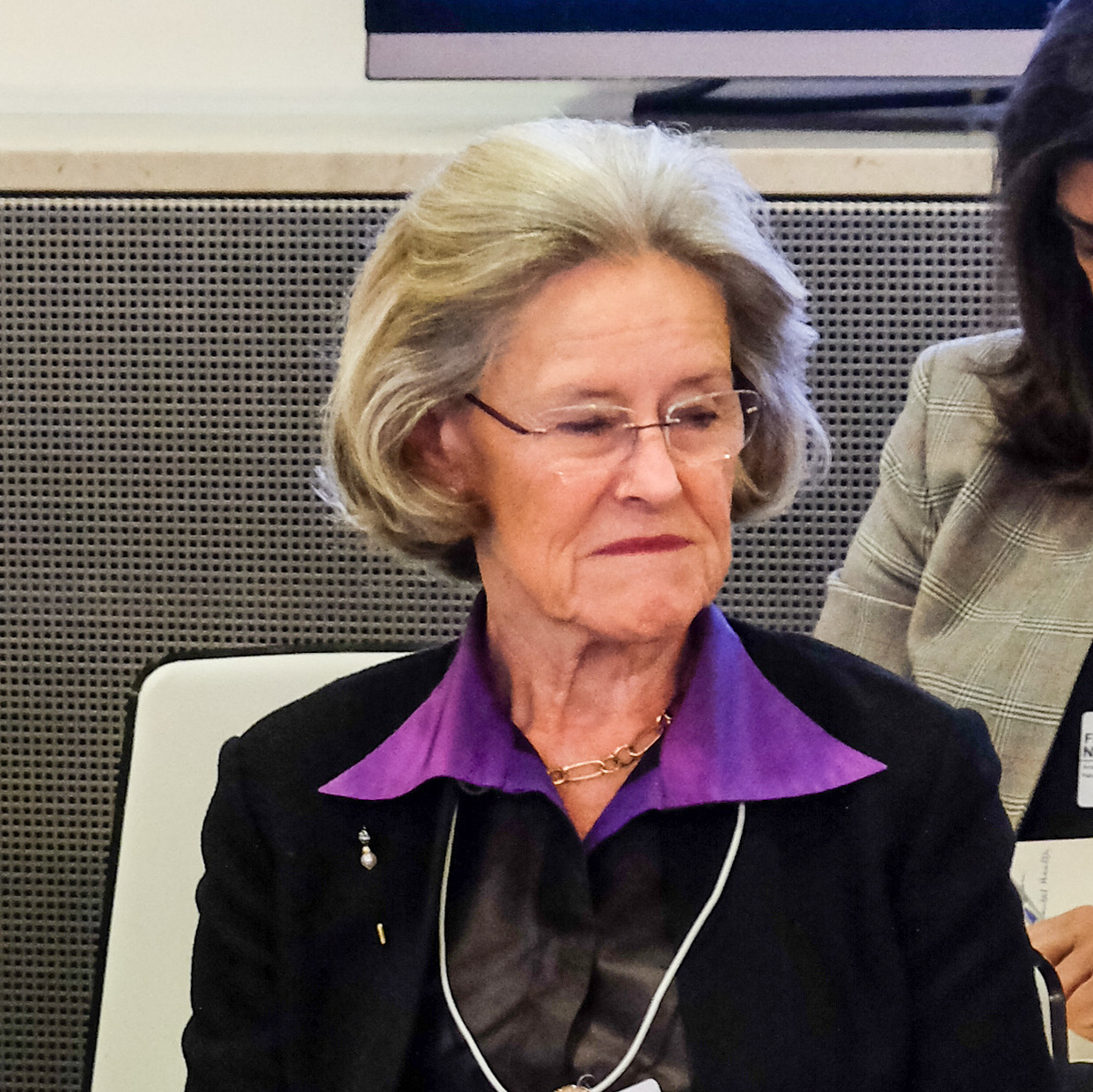
Hilde Schwab at the WEF Social Entrepreneurs Wrap-up in 2018

In 1998, Klaus Schwab and his wife Hilde created the independent not-for-profit Schwab Foundation for Social Entrepreneurship. Its mission was to promote social innovation. This new foundation was complementary to the World Economic Forum, founded by Klaus Schwab in 1971.

Pamela Hartigan, who joined in October 2000, was its first managing director, serving until 2008. The Foundation is financed from the initial endowment provided by the Schwabs plus grants and fees for services provided to individuals, foundations or companies.

== Activities ==
The Foundation identifies rising social entrepreneurs under the age of 40 through its Forum of Young Global Leaders and encourages the activists it recognizes to work together as a team. In this collaboration, ideas are shared and possible funding is attracted from companies, universities, or INSEAD. The activists may obtain support from corporations and political and academic leaders. The activists (260 people in 2013) serve on the Forum's Global Agenda Councils. Case studies on specific social entrepreneurs are provided to academic institutions to incorporate into undergraduate and graduate-level courses. Each year the Foundation selects 20-25 Social Entrepreneurs through a global “Social Entrepreneur of the Year” competition. Winners include Mikaela Jade, for innovation in indigenous edu-tech.

== Schwab Foundation Awards ==
The foundation presents annual awards, announced each January at the World Economic Forum Annual Meeting in Davos, in partnership with the Motsepe Foundation. Awardees join a three-year programme of support and become part of the foundation's community of social entrepreneurs and innovators, which the foundation reported as numbering 510 members in 2026.

Awards are made in four categories:

- Social Entrepreneurs – individuals using market-based approaches to address social issues directly.
- Corporate Social Innovators – leaders within established companies who embed social and environmental impact into core products, services and business models.
- Collective Social Innovators – people who bring organisations together to address problems that individual actors cannot tackle alone.
- Public Social Innovators – leaders in the public sector who apply social innovation through policy, regulation or public initiatives.

Eighteen awards were made in 2025 and twenty-one in 2026.

=== Recent awardees ===
The foundation has named awardees annually since 1998; those in recent years are listed below. A complete list is published by the foundation.

Year	Category	Organization	Awardee(s)
2026	Social Entrepreneurs	Tebita Ambulance	Kibret Abebe
2026	Social Entrepreneurs	eLiberare	Ioana Bauer Sǎndescu
2026	Social Entrepreneurs	Drinkwell	Minhaj Chowdhury
2026	Social Entrepreneurs	Onçafari	Mario Haberfeld
2026	Social Entrepreneurs	FabricAID	Omar Itani
2026	Social Entrepreneurs	Pad-Up Creations	Olivia Onyemaobi
2026	Social Entrepreneurs	Fundación Reimagina	Ana María Raad Briz
2026	Social Entrepreneurs	SaveLIFE Foundation	Piyush Tewari
2026	Corporate Social Innovators	Safaricom	Karen Basiye
2026	Corporate Social Innovators	VEJA	François-Ghislain Morillion
2026	Corporate Social Innovators	Reckitt	Hamzah Sarwar
2026	Collective Social Innovators	Arab Network for Environment and Development	Emad Adly; Ghada Ahmadein
2026	Collective Social Innovators	Beyond100K	Talia Milgrom-Elcott; Maya Morales Garcia
2026	Collective Social Innovators	Movilizatorio	Juliana Uribe Villegas; Mariana Díaz; Lina Torres
2026	Public Social Innovators	Ministry of Microfinance and Social and Solidarity Economy, Senegal	Mamadou Ndiaye
2026	Public Social Innovators	Laboratorio de Gobierno, Chile	Orlando Rojas
2026	Public Social Innovators	Institut Keusahawanan Negara, Malaysia	Viviantie Sarjuni
2025	Social Entrepreneurs	CareMessage	Cecilia Corral
2025	Social Entrepreneurs	CareMessage	Vineet Singal
2025	Social Entrepreneurs	Sommalife	Christina Mawuse Gyisun
2025	Social Entrepreneurs	Safe Motherhood Alliance	Muzalema Mwanza
2025	Social Entrepreneurs	Belterra Agroflorestas	Valmir Ortega
2025	Social Entrepreneurs	ANA Care	Manuel Rosemberg
2025	Social Entrepreneurs	NaTakallam	Aline Sara
2025	Social Entrepreneurs	Avanti Fellows	Akshay Saxena
2025	Public Social Innovators	Tatkraft	Islam Alijaj
2025	Public Social Innovators	Agency for Enterprise Development, Viet Nam	Trinh Thi Huong
2025	Corporate Social Innovators	Tencent	Caitlyn (Juhong) Chen
2025	Corporate Social Innovators	Northwell Health	Eric Cioè-Peña
2025	Corporate Social Innovators	Google Health	Fred Hersch
2025	Collective Social Innovators	Buddha Institute; Responsible Coalition for Resilient Communities	Ved Arya
2025	Collective Social Innovators	Population Foundation of India	Poonam Muttreja
2025	Collective Social Innovators	Aga Khan Foundation	Apoorva Oza
2025	Collective Social Innovators	Africa Sustainable Commodities Initiative	Abraham Baffoe
2025	Collective Social Innovators	Community Health Impact Coalition	Madeleine Ballard

== Allegations of employer misconduct and harassment at WEF ==
On June 29, 2024, The Wall Street Journal published an article, authored by staff reporters Shalini Ramachandran and Khadeeja Safdar, stating that WEF Founder Klaus Schwab is accused by former WEF employees of having engaged in two instances of sexual harassment. The Schwab Foundation for Social Entrepreneurship is a wholly separate organization from WEF and is neither mentioned or the subject of the published Wall Street Journal article.

== Board of directors ==
As of September 2024, the organization's Board of Directors consisted of:

- Hilde Schwab (Chairperson, Co-founder)
- Pascale Bruderer, Founder, Chairwoman, Swiss Stablecoin AG
- Mirai Chatterjee, Chairperson, SEWA Cooperative Federation, Self-Employed Women's Association
- Ernest Darkoh, Founding Partner, BroadReach Group
- Charly Kleissner, Co-founder, Toniic
- Johanna Mair, Professor of Organization, Strategy and Leadership, Hertie School
- Queen Mathilde of Belgium
- Subi Rangan, The Abu Dhabi Crown Prince Court Endowed Chair in Societal Progress, INSEAD
- Nicole Schwab, Co-Head, Nature Positive Pillar; Member of the Executive Committee, World Economic Forum Geneva
- Helle Thorning-Schmidt, Director, Thorning Schmidt Global Ltd
