= Zero fatality corridor =

Road safety model

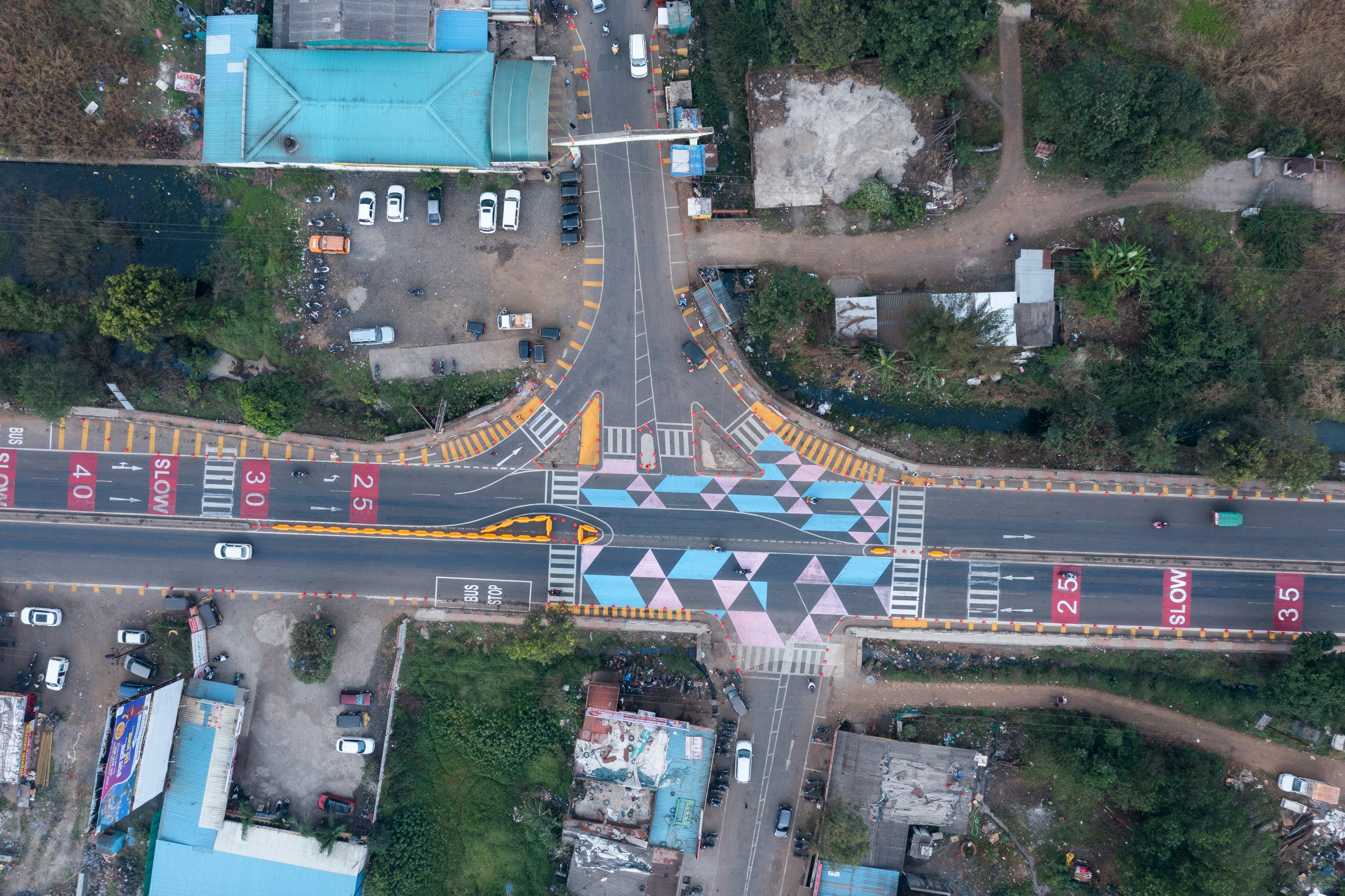
One of the many interventions under ZFC on India's National Highway 48

The Zero Fatality Corridor (ZFC) is a road traffic safety model relevant for low- and middle-income countries. The model originated in India and was developed by the Indian non-profit SaveLIFE Foundation (SLF). The model aims to reduce the number of road crashes and consequent injuries, damages and fatalities.

Within India, the ZFC model was first implemented on the Mumbai-Pune Expressway (MPEW) in the state of Maharashtra. In 2016, the 94.5 km Expressway suffered 151 fatalities in road crashes, making it one of the deadliest roads in India. As of 2020, the ZFC initiative has delivered a 52% reduction in road crash fatalities on the Expressway.

This road safety model implements solutions across Engineering, Enforcement, Emergency Care, and Engagement to save lives, and is now being replicated in multiple states across India.

== History ==
The ZFC model on the Mumbai-Pune Expressway has helped bring down the number of road crashes and fatalities. In 2016, the Expressway reported 151 fatalities. In 2020, following the implementation of the program, the Expressway reported a total of 66 fatalities in 63 crashes. Following the success of the ZFC model in Maharashtra, the state governments in Delhi, UP and Odisha have adopted the model for several of their crash-prone roads.

== Implementation ==
=== 4 ‘E’s of Road Safety ===
The ZFC model is executed through a 360-degree road safety solution which follows the 4 ‘E’s of safety: Engineering, Enforcement, Emergency Care, and Engagement.

Engineering – As proper road infrastructure and design can significantly minimise the mortality and morbidity burden of roads, they are a primary focus area for the ZFC model, aimed at mitigating engineering errors.

Enforcement – The ZFC project enhances enforcement through technology and other proven practices. Interceptor vehicles, equipped with speed detection radars, are deployed periodically to check traffic offences and help in issuing challans.

Emergency Care – The model’s emergency care system includes optimising the existing fleet of ambulances, to build a “Chain of Survival” through improving quality and speed of care at each point in a crash victim's journey. At the MPEW ZFC corridor, five 108 ambulances have been strategically placed on the Expressway for immediate and effective trauma response. SLF's Jeevan Rakshak Training Program, funded by mandatory corporate social responsibility contributions from private companies under India’s Companies Act, focuses on equipping policemen and members of the public, living or working in accident-prone areas, with basic first-aid skills and teaches them how to transport crash victims safely to the nearest hospital with immediacy.

Community Engagement – The project's public engagement component works towards influencing behaviour change for road users on matters related to road safety, through the pull strategy of communication. The ZFC model also includes a crash prevention training program, wherein drivers are trained to anticipate road hazards and manage fatigue. Within the capital city, Delhi Transport Corporation (DTC) bus drivers have been trained under this program.

== Impact, Awards and Recognitions ==
Currently, along with the Ministry of Road Transport and Highways (MoRTH), Government of India, SLF is looking at deploying the ZFC model on 12 more corridors in India. These include some of the highest fatality corridors in the country, spread across states like Uttar Pradesh, Maharashtra, Karnataka, Tamil Nadu, Telangana, Haryana, Madhya Pradesh, Punjab, Gujarat, Bihar, Chhattisgarh, Andhra Pradesh, Rajasthan and West Bengal. An MoU for the same has been signed between MoRTH and SLF.

The recognitions that the ZFC model has received, both, nationally and globally, include:

- Recognized by the World Economic Forum in December 2019, applauding the model's innovative measures to reduce road crashes and fatalities
- Siam CSR Award for Road Safety, 2019
- FICCI Road Safety Award, 2018
- SIAM CSR Award for Road Safety, 2018
- Road Safety Award by Shri Nitin Gadkari at the World Road Meeting, 2017
- Volvo Sustainable Mobility Award, 2016
