= A. K. Shiva Kumar =

- Born: 29 June 1956 (age 70); Chennai, Tamil Nadu, India
- Education: St. Joseph's College, Bangalore (B.A.); Bangalore University (M.A.); IIM Ahmedabad (M.B.A.); Harvard University (M.P.A., Ph.D.)
- Spouse: Poonam Muttreja
- Children: 2

A. K. Shiva Kumar (29 June 1956), is a development economist, policy advisor, and evaluator, who has over the past 40 years, taught economics, undertaken evaluations, conducted research and policy analysis, worked closely with governments, international agencies, and civil society organisations to advocate for changes in public policy and legislation. He teaches various courses at Harvard University, Indian School of Business, BITS School of Management, Young India Fellowship, S. P. Jain Institute of Management and Research and Ashoka University.

He is a board member of the Global Partnership to End Violence against Children, co-chair of Know in Violence in Childhood, and a member of the leadership councils of both the International Center for Research on Women (ICRW) and Global Women's Institute, The George Washington University, Washington DC. In addition to serving as a senior policy adviser UNICEF – India (1992-2017), he was a member of India's National Advisory Council to the Prime Minister of India, constituted by the Chairperson Sonia Gandhi. The council was set up in June 2004 to oversee the implementation of India's National Common Minimum Programme.

== Early life ==
Kumar earned his postgraduate diploma in management from the Indian Institute of Management, Ahmedabad, and his MA in economics from Bangalore University. He also holds a master's degree in public administration and a Ph.D. in political economy and government from Harvard University. At Harvard, Kumar's Ph.D. supervisor was Nobel Laureate Amartya Sen.

== Career ==
Kumar teaches economics and public policy at the Harvard Kennedy School and is a visiting professor at the Indian School of Business in Hyderabad, the Young India Fellowship at Ashoka University and S. P. Jain Institute of Management and Research in Mumbai. He has focused his research on poverty and human development, social sector analysis, and the impact of development policies on children and women. He is recipient of the MacArthur Fellowship, Mason Fellowship, and the Certificate of Excellence in Teaching from Harvard University. He serves as the President of the Board of Trustees of Sanskriti Foundation.

Kumar is the convener of the Kolkata Group Meeting annual workshops which are organised by Pratichi (India) Trust, the Harvard Global Equity Initiative and UNICEF India – and supervised and led by Amartya Sen. He serves on the Academic Council of Ashoka University. Kumar is also a member of the Executive Board of India's leading environmental protection organisation – the Centre for Science and Environment. In 2011, the Comptroller and Auditor General of India constituted an Audit Advisory Board (AAB) of which Dr. Kumar was a member.

Kumar has been a regular contributor to UNDP's Annual Human Development Reports. He has also been associated with the preparation of national human development reports in a number of countries including Bhutan, Maldives, Mongolia, Myanmar and Serbia. He was appointed by the Government of Sikkim as advisor for formulating Sikkim's second Human Development Report.

In 2003, Kumar co-edited the book Readings in Human Development. His other publications include the Public Report on Basic Education (PROBE) (Oxford University Press, 1999) and a co-authored report entitled, Women in India: How free? How Equal, for the UN System in India. He also put together The Oxford Handbook of Population and Development.

Kumar released the Delhi Human Development Report 2013 along with Delhi CM Sheila Dikshit and Vice-President Hamid Ansari. He formerly served as the Director of the International Centre for Human Development (IC4HD), New Delhi. The IC4HD was a constituent of the United Nations and along with support from the Ministry of Human Resource Development (India).

== Other activities ==
- Global Partnership to End Violence Against Children, Member of the Board (since 2016)
