= 30th World Economic Forum =

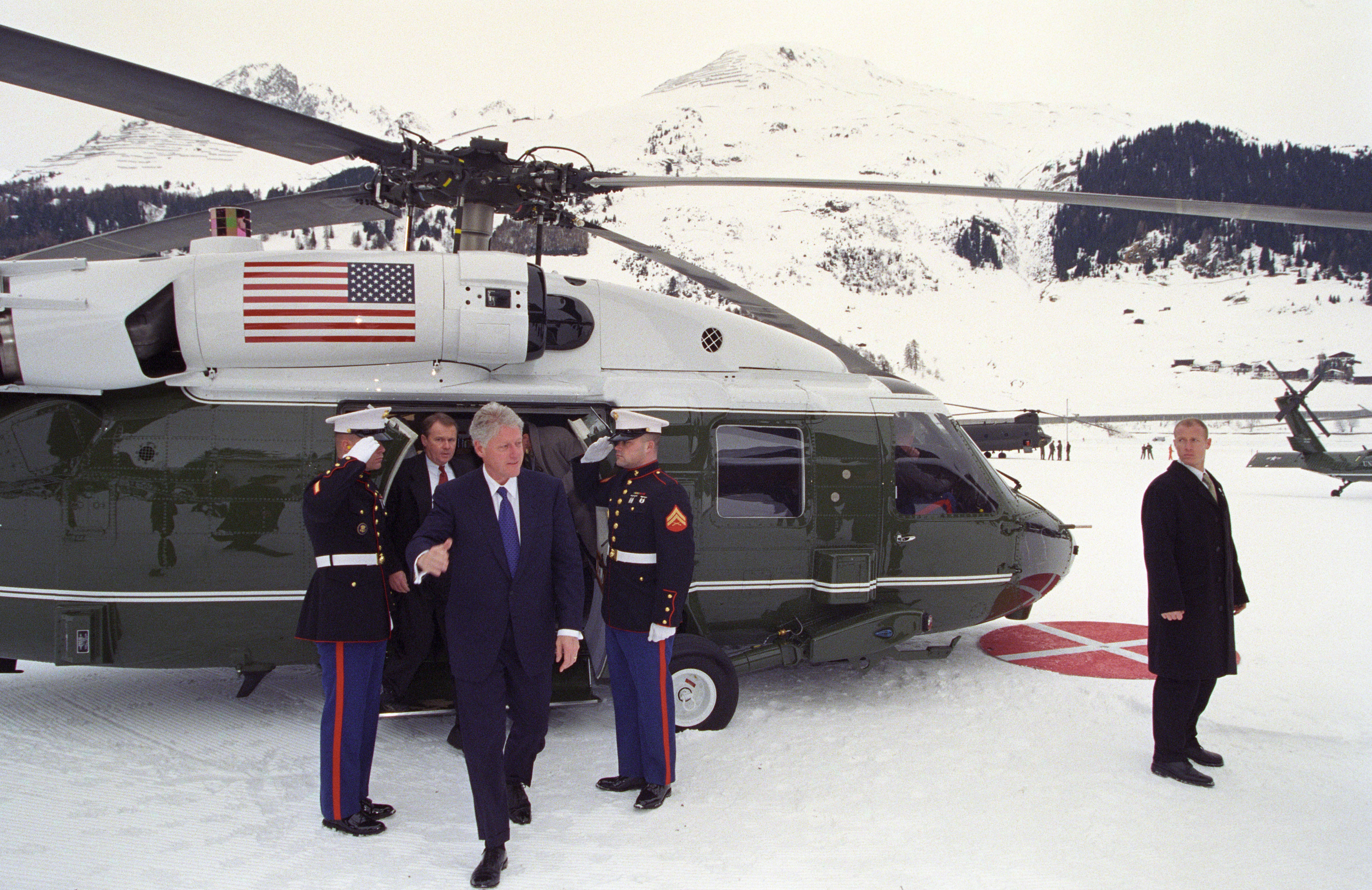
President Bill Clinton disembarking Marine One in Davos on 29 January 2000

The 30th World Economic Forum or the 2000 World Economic Forum Annual Meeting was held between 27 January and 3 February 2000 in Davos, Switzerland. It was the 30th annual meeting of the World Economic Forum. The annual meeting was joined by an estimated 2,000 attendees. The slogan of the meeting was "New Beginnings: Making a Difference".

The GAVI vaccination alliance was launched at the 2000 annual meeting. An initial pledge of $750 million (equivalent to $1,402,173,913 in 2025) was made by the Bill and Melinda Gates Foundation to GAVI at the meeting.

In 2000 corporate executives paid $22,500 (equivalent to $42,065 in 2025) to attend the conference. 1,000 companies paid $15,000 each to attend.

== Background ==
The meeting occurred two months after the 1999 Seattle WTO protests which had caused the negotiations at the World Trade Organization Ministerial Conference of 1999 to end without agreement. The head of the World Trade Organization and many national trade ministers attended the meeting in Davos hoping to restart negotiations. Joseph Khan wrote in The New York Times that attendees were "treating the surprise collapse of the Seattle talks as the first real crisis to confront globalization since the fall of Communism".

The director of the WEF, Klaus Schwab, stated that the aim of the meeting was to create a "social consciousness of the global economy". In the wake of the Seattle protests Schwab widened the list of invitees to include representatives of nongovernment organizations and trades unions. The official history of the World Economic Forum described the 2000 meeting as the year that the forum "very evidently moved from a convener of business and government leaders to a platform integrating all key stakeholders of global society" with the inclusion of major Non-governmental organizations which resulted in "ongoing informal dialogue emerg[ing] to foster better understanding and cooperation". Writing in The Times, Alasdair Murrary felt that the meeting had "an air of post-millennium optimism" with the emerging potential of new technologies such as the internet and biotechnology being a key focus of debates.

Pope John Paul II sent a special message to the World Economic Forum, writing that in a long message that "Globalization without ethical and moral values will produce deeper polarization in the world, as the strong and weak grow ever further apart".

The forum was carbon neutral for the first time. Trees were planted in Mexico by Green Globe 21 on behalf of the forum to compensate for the emitted gases created by the meeting.

The Swiss Armed Forces were deployed to protect the attendees due to expected protests. Police forces from across Switzerland were also drafted into Davos to provide security. The Swiss protest group Anti-WTO Coalition vowed to block roads into Davos.

320 sessions were scheduled for the meeting. Individual presentations included "Watch out the I-Word (inflation) is back", "Stock Markets: how long will the boom last?" and "Vigour, values and passion: new leadership in action" in addition to sessions on bioterrorism and the Human Genome Project.

== Notable attendees ==
The meeting ws opened by the President of Switzerland Adolf Ogi who appealed to attendees to ensure globalisation "proceeds in a responsible manner".

The president of the United States, Bill Clinton addressed the meeting on 29 January. This was the first annual meeting attended by a sitting American president. In his speech Clinton said that "We have got a chance to build a 21st-century world that walks away from the modern horrors of bio and chemical terrorism and from ancient racial, religious and tribal hatred. Growth is at the centre of that chance. It gives people hope every day. But the economics must be blended with the other legitimate human concerns". Clinton said that “Fifty years of experience shows that greater economic integration and political cooperation are positive forces ... Those who believe globalisation is only about market economics are wrong, too".

In his speech the prime minister of the United Kingdom, Tony Blair proposed that leading countries establish a panel to help refine the bureaucracy of the World Trade Organization and urged the United States, Japan and Europe to drop import barriers from the poorest countries as a good will gesture. Blair said that "There's no point in pretending that Seattle was not a setback for free trade ... We have an enormous job to do to convince opponents, many of whom I think are wrong, that they can live with globalization".

The president of the American union federation AFL-CIO John Sweeney attended. Sweeney said that the protests in Seattle were "just the beginning ... Unless workers are involved, globalization will not work".

=== Heads of state and governments ===
- Martti Ahtisaari, President of Finland
- Yasir Arafat, Head of the Palestinian Authority
- Ehud Barak, Prime Minister of Israel
- Tony Blair, Prime Minister of the United Kingdom
- Bill Clinton, President of the United States
- Thabo Mbeki, President of South Africa
- Mahathir Mohamad, Prime Minister of Malaysia
- Abdurrahman Wahid, President of Indonesia
- Ernesto Zedillo, President of Mexico

=== Economic and political representatives ===
- Madeleine K. Albright, United States Secretary of State
- Charlene Barshefsky, United States trade representative
- Samuel R. Berger, United States national security adviser
- William M. Daley, United States Secretary of Commerce
- Hans Eichel, German Finance Minister
- Yoshimasa Hayashi, Japanese vice finance minister
- Mikhail Kasyanov, Russian Finance Minister
- Bill Richardson, United States Energy Secretary
- Gene Sperling, United States economic policy adviser
- Larry Summers, United States Secretary of the Treasury
- Jean-Claude Trichet, Governor of the Bank of France
