= Piyush Tewari =

Indian social entrepreneur

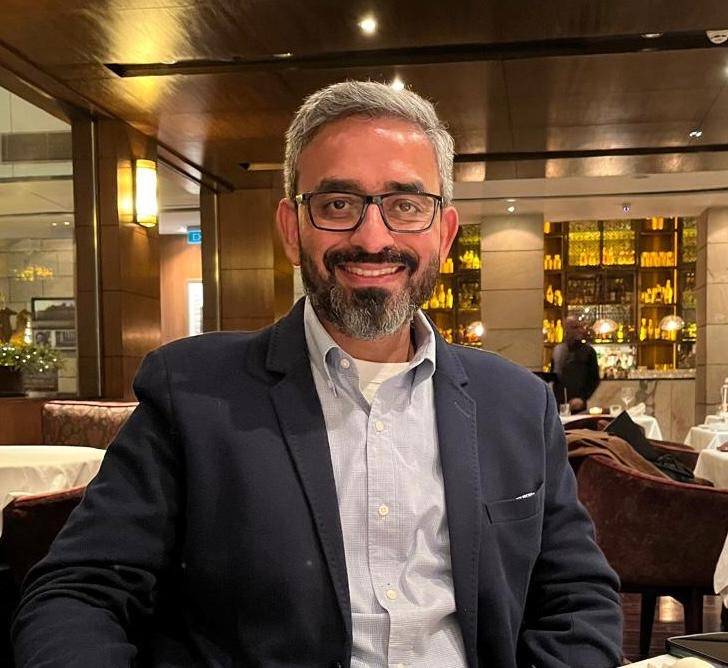
- Born: 19 May 1980 (age 46); Kanpur, Uttar Pradesh
- Education: Delhi University; Harvard University
- Known for: Passing Legislation for a Good Samaritan Law in India
- Title: Founder and CEO of the SaveLIFE Foundation
- Parent(s): Vinay Tewari; Reena Tewari
- Relatives: Anshul Tewari (Brother), Neha Tewari (Sister)
- Awards: Ashoka Fellowship; Echoing Green Fellowship, AIESEC India Alumni Entrepreneurship & Leadership Award; Rolex Laureate
- Website: https://savelifefoundation.org

Piyush Tewari (born 19 May 1980) is an Indian social entrepreneur, focused on improving road safety, access to emergency medical care and urban governance across India. He is the founder and CEO of SaveLIFE Foundation, and best known for his work to pass a Good Samaritan law in India. In 2016, GQ Magazine named him as one of the most influential young Indians. In 2014, Tewari was featured as an expert on Satyamev Jayate, a popular TV show on social issues, hosted by actor Aamir Khan. The episode Tewari was featured in was focused on the epidemic of road accidents in India.

He is also an empaneled speaker with The Outstanding Speakers Bureau, and is the subject of "The Golden Hour", a feature documentary produced by Roma Sur and Jessica McGough of the Film School at University of Colorado, Denver, USA. He is a commentator on Road Safety in Indian media and has been covered by the New York Times, TIME Magazine, and National Geographic, among other media outlets.

== Early life and career ==
Tewari was born in Kanpur, India to Reena and Vinay Tewari on 19 May 1980. Tewari finished high school from Naval Public School in New Delhi. He holds a Bachelor of Information Technology degree from Delhi University, and a Master of Public Administration degree from Harvard University.

During his time in college, Tewari was actively involved with AIESEC, a global student-led non-profit. Immediately after college, he joined the India Brand Equity Foundation, an initiative of the Government of India. Following his stint there, in 2006 he joined the Calibrated Group — a US-based private-equity firm. In 2008, he became the Managing Director of the company’s operations in India.

== SaveLIFE Foundation ==
Tewari founded the SaveLIFE Foundation (SLF) on 29 February 2008, following the death of a young cousin in a road crash. In response to the tragedy, he studied the issue of road safety and discovered that over 1 million people had been killed in road crashes in India in the previous decade. He also discovered that 50% of these deaths were due to lack of timely care, as confirmed by the Law Commission of India in its 201st report.

SLF started by training police and Indian citizens to become better responders to the injured. Over time, the organization started advocating for systemic changes to save lives. In 2015, Tewari and SLF got a ban imposed on trucks from carrying protruding rods. In 2016, SLF, through a writ petition to the Supreme Court of India, successfully advocated for a Good Samaritan Law in India as a provision protecting personal well-being. In 2017, a bill recommended by SLF to improve road safety in the country was passed by the Lok Sabha.

SLF is now focusing on implementation of road safety best-practices. As part of that focus, it has adopted the Mumbai-Pune Expressway to make it fatality-free by 2020.

== Personal life ==
Tewari has two siblings: a sister, Neha and a brother, Anshul. Anshul is the founder of Youth Ki Awaaz, the largest youth-based media platform in India.

== Honours and awards ==
- 2010: Rolex Laureate, Rolex Awards for Enterprise
- 2011: AIESEC India Alumni Entrepreneurship & Leadership Award
- 2012: Echoing Green Fellowship
- 2013: Ashoka Fellowship
- 2014: Profiled by Satyamev Jayate TV show hosted by actor Aamir Khan
- 2015: GQ India Man of the Year
- 2015: TIME Magazine Next Gen Leader
- 2016: GQ India Most Influential Young Indians
- 2016: Profiled by New York Times
- 2016: Profiled by National Geographic Magazine
- 2017: Draper Richard Kaplan Foundation Fellowship
- 2017: IRF Road Safety Award 2017
- 2018: Mulago Foundation's Rainer Arnhold Fellowship
- 2019: World Economic Forum Young Global Leader
- 2020: GQ Heroes 2020
- 2023: The Elevate Prize 2023
- 2024: Skoll Award for Social Innovation 2024
