= SaveLIFE Foundation =

Indian non-profit organization

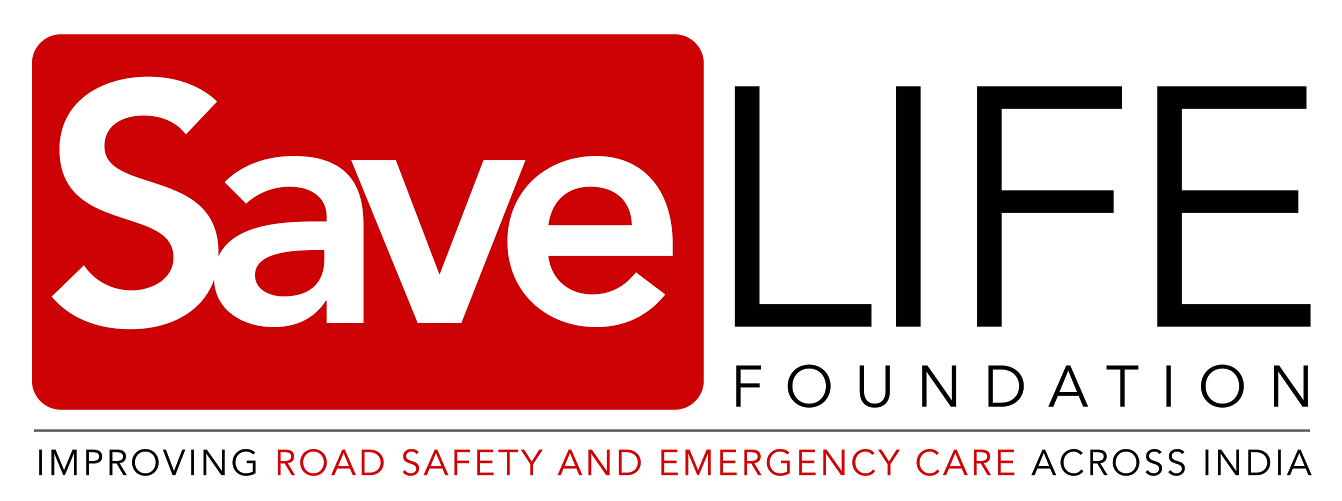
- Founded: 29 February 2008
- Founders: Piyush Tewari
- Type: Non-governmental Organisation
- Headquarters: New Delhi, India
- Website: savelifefoundation.org

SaveLIFE Foundation (SLF) is an independent, non-profit, non-governmental organization focused on improving road safety and emergency medical care across India. SLF combines evidence-based research with policy advocacy, communication, and on-ground execution of projects in the two areas of crash prevention as well as post-crash response. Over the past few years, SLF has facilitated the enactment of the Good Samaritan Law in India, which insulates lay rescuers of injured victims from ensuing legal and procedural hassles. It has also adopted the Mumbai Pune Expressway to transform it into a Zero Fatality Corridor, trained several thousand Police personnel and citizens in basic life-saving techniques, and built technology platforms to assist road users and those interested in road safety.

SLF is registered as a Public Charitable Trust under the Indian Trust Act, 1886 and Sections 12A & 80G of the (Indian) Income Tax Act, 1961.

== Background ==
In the past decade, over one million people have been killed in road crashes in India. Close to six million have been left seriously injured or permanently disabled. Road crashes are the single biggest killer of young people, aged 15 to 45 years in India. An alarming number of families have fallen into poverty after losing their primary breadwinners to road crashes. According to the 12th Report of the erstwhile Planning Commission of India, road crashes lead to an annual economic loss equivalent to 3% of India's annual GDP. In August 2013, the Supreme Court of India termed the problem of road crash deaths a "National Emergency". SLF was established to reduce the burden of death and injury due to road crashes.

== History ==
SLF was founded on 29 February 2008 by Piyush Tewari, following the death of a young cousin in a road crash. In response to the incident, Piyush studied the issue of road safety in India and discovered the enormity of the problem. He then invited his friend and mentor Kishen Mehta to join him in setting up SLF with a mission to save lives on India's roads.

SLF started by training police personnel, the first responders in most road crash cases, in basic life-saving skills. SLF then expanded its mandate to focus on a Good Samaritan Law for India, which would enable bystanders to become active rescuers by insulating them from ensuing legal and procedural hassles. On 30 March 2016, the Honorable Supreme Court of India, enacted a binding set of policies to protect Good Samaritans, in response to a public interest petition filed by SLF. More recently, SLF has played a key role in the drafting and introduction of a comprehensive Road Safety bill in the Indian parliament. SLF has further expanded its operations to include implementation of best practices on the ground. Its initiatives to make the Mumbai-Pune Expressway fatality-free by 2020 is in line with its renewed mission.

== Intervention model ==
To achieve its objectives, SLF operates across the four broad areas of Research, Advocacy, Communication and on-ground implementation of best practices.

=== Research ===
SLF regularly conducts primary research driven by surveys and on-ground data collection. The research feeds into SLF's activities in the areas of advocacy, public communication and on-ground implementation of best practices. Some of the research studies that have resulted in significant public interest have been listed below.

Impediments to Bystander Care in India

In 2013, SLF undertook India's first diagnostic study to trace the real causes which make Indian bystanders reluctant to help the victims in times of emergency. It revealed that three out of four people in India are reluctant to help road crash victims and for a majority, this reluctance stemmed from a fear of being dragged into protracted police investigations and legal hassles. This study affirmed the urgent need for unequivocal laws to support and protect Good Samaritans in India.

Distracted Driving in India: A Study on Mobile Phone Usage, Pattern and Behavior

SLF and Vodafone India Ltd. partnered to study the issue of distracted driving in India. the initiative aimed to understand how Indians use mobile phones while driving, to educate them about the dangers of the same, and to develop a tool to reduce incidence of distracted driving. Under this initiative, SLF undertook a national survey and published country's first of its kind report titled 'Distracted Driving in India: A Study on Mobile Phone Usage, Pattern and Behavior' which revealed that a high number of people in ten Indian cities admitted to actively using mobile phones while driving despite knowing about its ills. The study not only created conversation around the issue of distracted driving, but also recommended interventions in legislation, enforcement and education to address it. It pointed out how no specific data was being collected by the government to estimate mobile phone usage on roads and finally in 2016, for the first time, the annual publication by the Ministry of Road Transport and Highways contained a table on crashes attributed to mobile phone usage in India.

Road Safety in India: Public Perception Survey

In 2017, SLF undertook a ten-city public perception survey to converge popular opinion on key issues of Road Safety in India, which was published at a time when the Rajya Sabha was set to discuss the Motor Vehicles (Amendment) Bill. Among other crucial findings, the survey revealed that 6 out of 10 in the country admitted to getting license without giving a test and the same was indicated when the Minister of Road Transport and Highways initiated a debate on the same bill in Lok Sabha in April, asking how many MPs had appeared for a driving test and barely a few hands went up. The study also revealed that 8 out of 10 road users in India felt unsafe on the roads.

=== Advocacy ===
Good Samaritan Law

The Law Commission of India, in its 201st Report, stated that 50% of those who die on Indian roads can be saved if they receive timely medical attention including assistance from bystanders. However, SLF undertook a survey study which found out that most bystanders in India are hesitant to help the injured due to fear of harassment and intimidation at the hands of police and hospitals. Taking cognizance of the same, SLF petitioned the Supreme Court of India to issue directions for the protection of Good Samaritans in road crash cases. On 30 March 2016, in a landmark ruling, the Supreme Court issued guidelines for the protection of Good Samaritans. By invoking Article 141 and 142 of the Constitution, the court gave these guidelines a force of law across India.

Ban on trucks carrying protruding rods

SLF undertook a detailed analysis of the injuries and deaths caused by trucks carrying protruding rods and found out that such protruding overloads, mainly iron rods, claimed nearly 40,000 lives and injured over 1 lakh people in 99,384 crashes in just two years. The organization then petitioned the Supreme Court to facilitate a ban on protruding rods. The petition demanded that the owner of transport company or persons hiring the vehicle and the driver may be made jointly liable under the civil and criminal law for crashes caused by such protrusions, trucks carrying iron rods and bars of pipes stationed on the road or roadside be barricaded by traffic cones and reflector tripods with visibility of 50 meters and that all states adopt uniform regulations in respect of stationary or stalled vehicles on highways.

Responding to the apex court's directions in the PIL proceedings, the Ministry of Road Transport and Highways deleted the provision in the Central Motor Vehicles Rules, 1989 which allowed protrusions up to one meter. In August 2016, the Supreme Court finally ordered strict implementation of the ban on trucks and trailers with iron rods or pipes dangerously protruding out and also called for strict action against those trucks that are illegally parked in the middle of the roads.

Stronger Road Safety Law

Acknowledging the need for a comprehensive road safety law for India, SLF in March and April 2014, organized high-level consultation meetings with stakeholders from ten states to deliberate the same and develop actionable recommendations to address the identified issues. The primary recommendation from this exercise was that India needs a comprehensive Road Safety law and it was advocated that the existing Motor Vehicles Act 1988 be repealed to pave way for the new law. Subsequently, SLF's advocacy with the Government of India culminated in the Road Transport and Safety Bill, 2014. However, after several states shelved the passage of this bill, it got replaced by the Motor Vehicles (Amendment) Bill which was recommended by SLF, and got unanimously passed by Lok Sabha, the lower house of Indian parliament, in April 2017. The Bill now awaits passage by the upper house of Indian parliament, Rajya Sabha.

=== Communication ===
In order to engage the public to improve their behavior on the road and make them aware of their rights and duties, SLF regularly carries out communication and awareness campaigns. Some are listed below.

TV Campaign

SLF produced a short film to increase awareness about the consequences of distracted driving. This film was a part of SLF's awareness campaign on the dangers of distracted driving and was telecast across the State of Karnataka in 2017.

Print Campaign

SLF has undertaken print campaigns on awareness regarding the Good Samaritan law.

Radio

SLF has also undertaken radio campaigns to increase seat-belt usage, and awareness around the Good Samaritan law.

=== Implementation ===
Mumbai-Pune Expressway: India's first Zero Fatality Corridor

SLF with support from Mahindra & Mahindra Ltd. and the Maharashtra State Road Development Corporation (MSRDC), initiated the 'Zero Fatality Corridor' project to make the expressway fatality-free by 2020. Since August 2016, over a thousand engineering errors on the expressway have been fixed. As a part of this project, the 'Safety Under 80' campaign was also jointly launched by SLF, MSRDC and Mahindra & Mahindra Ltd. The initiative aimed at creating mass awareness on the dangers of speeding and the consequences of speeding were exhibited through outdoor hoardings and installation of crashes cars on both the corridors of the expressway.

Jeevan Rakshak Program

Jeevan Rakshak is a training program focused on imparting basic life-saving skills to Police personnel as well as ordinary citizens. The program was developed by SLF in partnership with All India Institute of Medical Sciences (AIIMS). Over 10,000 police personnel and volunteers in over six States and Union Territories have been trained so far.

ADAPT: Anticipatory Driving and Accident Prevention Training Program

SLF conducts the 'Anticipatory Driving and Accident Prevention Training' program for commercial as well as regular drivers. The program uses blended learning techniques to reinforce key strategies for crash prevention. Since its inception, SLF has trained over 3,000 drivers in ten States and Union Territories across India.

Online Victim Support Center

Through its website, SLF provides information on safety tips, emergency response, emergency numbers and how to save a person's life under the 'Check, Call and Care' protocol. It also provides a list of organizations and schemes for post-crash care and treatment for victims including both hospital care and rehabilitation. It also developed a calculation tool which aids victims in estimating the compensation quantum and procedure in such cases. This information is available free-of-charge.

Vodafone-SaveLIFE 'Road Safe' Mobile Application

In 2017, SLF partnered with Vodafone India to tackle the issue of distracted driving. As part of the initiative, a mobile app 'Road Safe' was launched in April, 2017 for both Android and IOS users. The app aims to enable distraction-free driving and includes features focused on driving safely and responding to emergencies. Besides providing information on traffic fines, safety tips, nearest emergency network systems, the app has a feature called the 'Automatic Crash Detector', which employs the phone's accelerometer to detect sudden drop in vehicle speed and provides automatic voice enabled emergency response assistance.

== Impact ==
- SLF has delivered a 30 per cent reduction in road crashes and injuries on the Mumbai-Pune Expressway from 2016 to 2017. Contribution of infrastructural factors road crashes on Mumbai-Pune Expressway brought down to near zero in 2017.
- It has secured a nationwide, legally binding policy for protection of Good Samaritans who assist the injured, from ensuing legal and procedural hassles.
- It has secured a ban on trucks from carrying protruding rods, expected to save close to 10,000 lives annually.
- It has trained over 13,000 police personnel, high risk commercial drivers and citizen volunteers in accident prevention techniques and basic life-saving skills.
- It has supported the Government of India in drafting and introducing a comprehensive road safety bill in the Indian parliament. The Motor Vehicles (Amendment) Bill 2017, consequently introduced was passed by the Lok Sabha on 10 April 2017.

== Awards and recognition ==
- Social Entrepreneur of the Year 2025 (SEOY) by The Jubilant Bhartia Foundation and the Schwab Foundation for Social Entrepreneurship
- Amazing Indian Award 2024
- Skoll Award for Social Innovation 2024
- Elevate Prize 2023
- Awarded the Draper Richard Kaplan Foundation fellowship, 2017
- Featured by National Geographic, November 2016
- Featured by New York Times, June 2016
- Featured by TIME, September 2015
- Conferred the Prince Michael International Road Safety Award, 2014
- Profiled by Satyamev Jayate, hosted by actor Amir Khan, 2014
- Awarded NGO of the Year 2014–15 by Rockefeller Foundation, Resource Alliance and EdelGive Foundation, 2014
- Invited to become a member of the Clinton Global Initiative, 2014
- Featured by Forbes Magazine in 2013
- Appointed full-voting member of the Global Alliance of NGOs for Road Safety in 2013
- Awarded the Ashoka Fellowship in 2013
- Subject of award-winning feature documentary titled The Golden Hour produced by Jessica McGough and Roma Sur of the Film School at University of Colorado, Denver, US
- Awarded the Echoing Green Fellowship in 2012
- Received letters of commendation from Delhi Police (2011) and National Security Guard (NSG, 2009) for its effort to equip first responders with life-saving skills.
- Invited to the National Committee constituted by Ministry of Health and Family Welfare, India and WHO to frame guidelines for pre-hospital trauma care in 2011.
- Awarded the Rolex Award for Enterprise, 2010

== See also ==
- Piyush Tewari
