= Poonam Muttreja =

Indian humanist

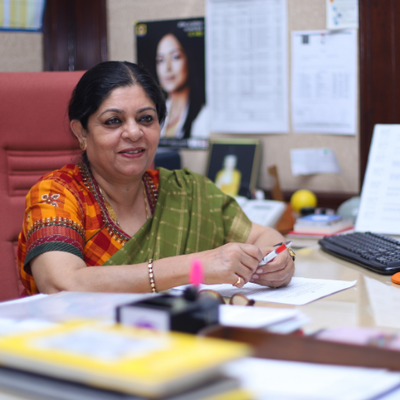
- Education: Master's in Public Administration, Bachelor's in Psychology
- Alma mater: University of Delhi, Harvard Kennedy School
- Title: Executive Director of Population Foundation of India

Poonam Muttreja is the executive director of the Population Foundation of India. She has more than 35 years of experience in the socio-development sector. Before joining PFI, she worked with the MacArthur Foundation as Country Director where she was responsible for the Foundation's grants in India.

Ms Muttreja has made an active contribution to the NGO sector in India. She is associated with several national and international organizations in the capacity of a member of the governing board and advisory council. She has also founded organisations working in the area of social justice (SRUTI), craft (DASTKAR), and leadership (Founder Director of the Ashoka Foundation in India), specifically focusing in the field of women's health.

She has also co-conceived the popular, transmedia initiative, Main Kuch Bhi Kar Sakti Hoon (MKBKSH - I, A Woman, Can Achieve Anything) which has been a change-maker through three successful seasons - with 183 episodes and overall TV viewership of approximately 150 million.

Ms Muttreja has a Master's Degree in Public Administration from the Kennedy School of Government, Harvard University and a Bachelor's Degree in Psychology from the University of Delhi. She worked with UNDP as Advisor to the Country Representative. In Cambridge, Massachusetts she directed an environmental program concerned with orienting policy makers from developing countries on issues of development, environment and poverty.
