= World Economic Forum =

Swiss international advocacy organization

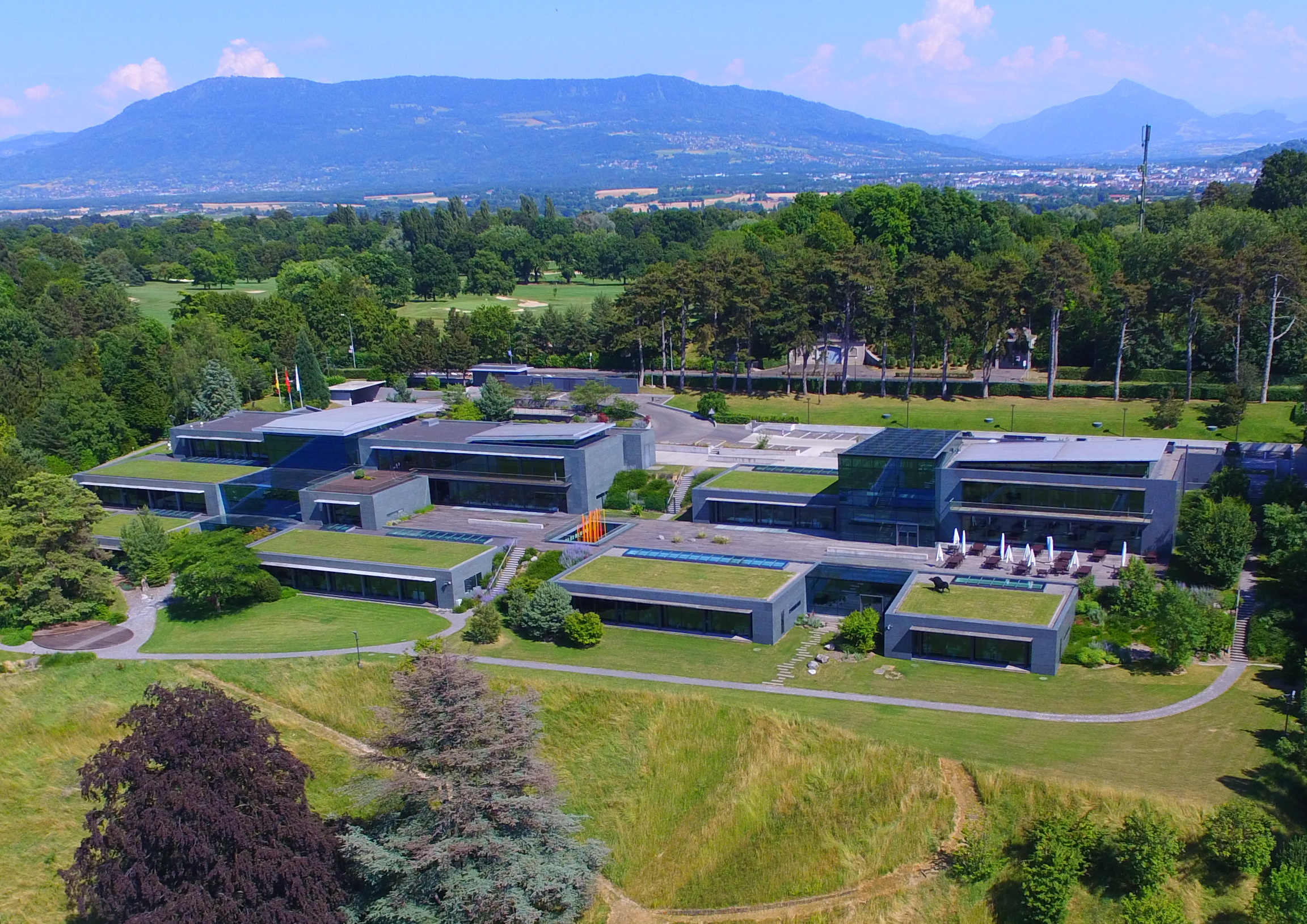
- Headquarters in Cologny, Switzerland
- Formation: 24 January 1971; 55 years ago
- Founder: Klaus Schwab
- Type: International NGO, lobbying organisation
- Legal status: Foundation
- Purpose: Influencing global agendas and decision making, public-private cooperation
- Headquarters: Cologny, Switzerland
- Region served: Worldwide
- Official language: English
- Chairman: Larry Fink
- President and CEO: Alois Zwinggi
- Website: www.weforum.org
- Formerly called: European Management Forum

The World Economic Forum (WEF) is an international advocacy non-governmental organization and think tank, based in Cologny, Canton of Geneva, Switzerland. It was founded on 24 January 1971 by German engineer Klaus Schwab. The foundation's stated mission is "improving the state of the world by engaging business, political, academic, and other leaders of society to shape global, regional, and industry agendas".

The WEF hosts an annual meeting at the end of January in Davos, a mountain resort in the Swiss canton of Graubünden, in the eastern Alps region. The meeting brings together some 3,000 paying members and selected participants – among whom are investors, business leaders, political leaders, economists, celebrities and journalists – for up to five days to discuss global issues across 500 sessions. The foundation is mostly funded by its 1,000-member multi-national companies.

Aside from Davos, the organization convenes regional conferences, it produces a series of reports, engages its members in sector-specific initiatives and provides a platform for leaders from selected stakeholder groups to collaborate on projects and initiatives.

The World Economic Forum and its annual meeting in Davos have received criticism over the years, including allegations of the organization's corporate capture of global and democratic institutions, institutional whitewashing initiatives, the public cost of security, the organization's tax-exempt status, unclear decision processes and membership criteria, a lack of financial transparency, and the environmental footprint of its annual meetings.

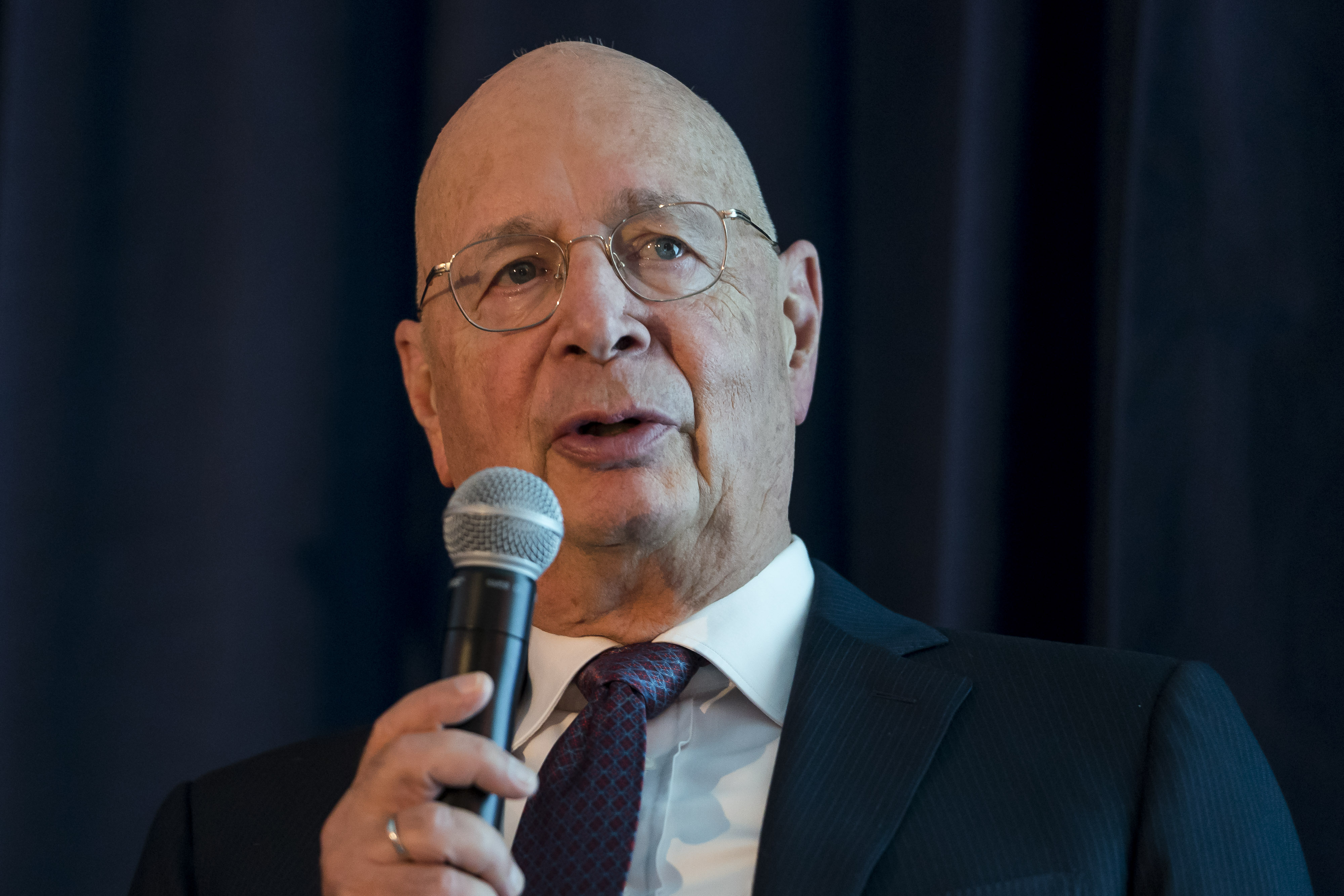
Klaus Schwab, founder and former executive chairman, World Economic Forum

== History ==
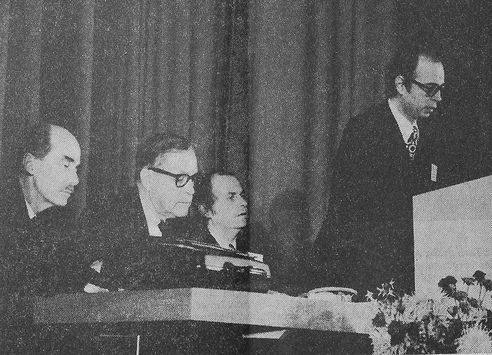
Professor Klaus Schwab opens the inaugural European Management Forum in Davos in 1971.

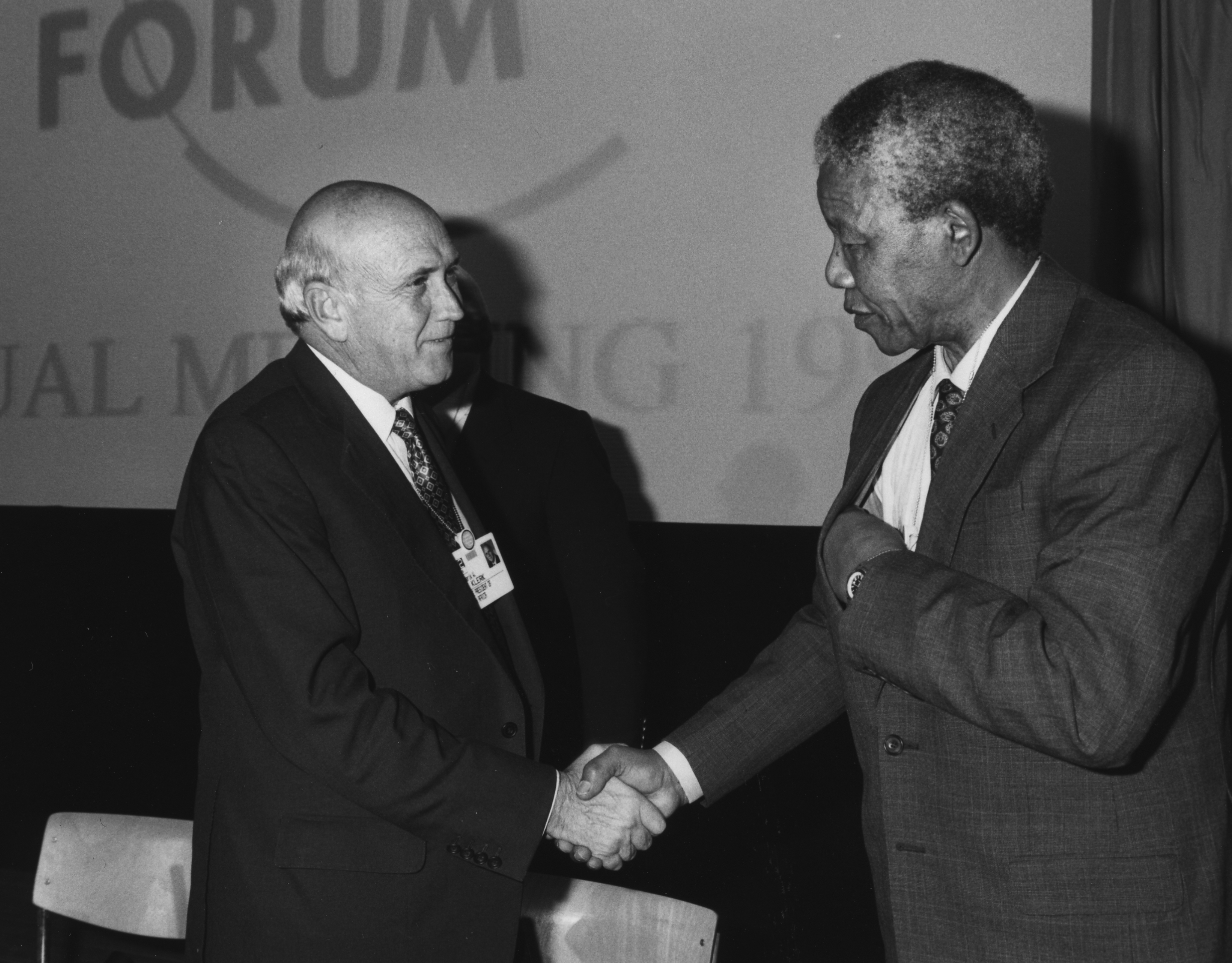
F. W. de Klerk and Nelson Mandela shake hands at the annual meeting of the World Economic Forum held in Davos in January 1992.

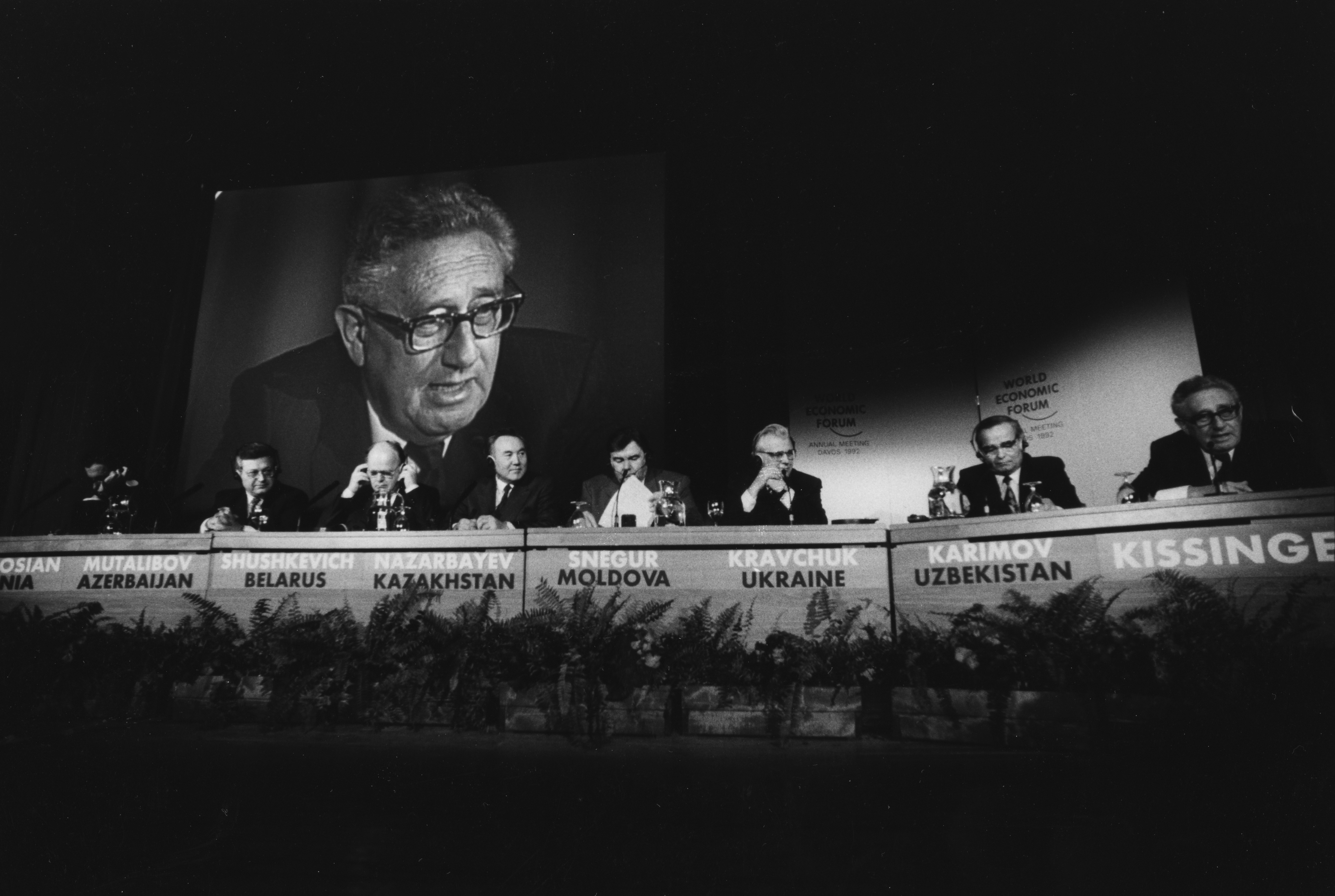
Henry Kissinger with former USSR leaders at the WEF annual meeting 1992

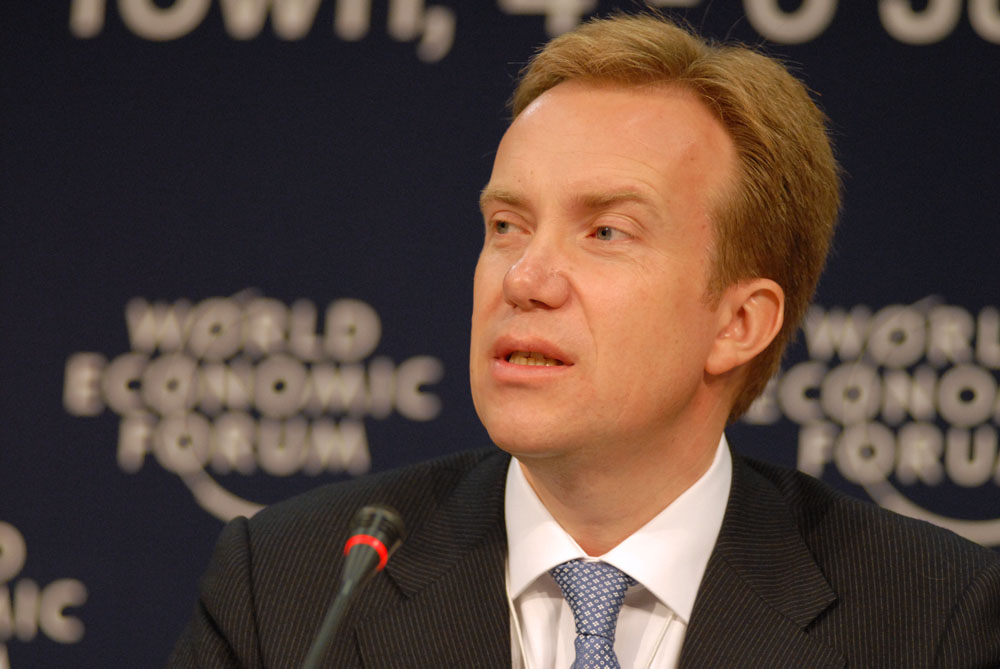
Børge Brende resigned as president and CEO of the World Economic Forum over his relationship with Jeffrey Epstein.

The WEF was founded in 1971 by Klaus Schwab, a business professor at the University of Geneva. First named the European Management Forum, it changed its name to the World Economic Forum in 1987 and sought to broaden its vision to include providing a platform for resolving international conflicts.

In February 1971, Schwab invited 450 executives from Western European firms to the first European Management Symposium held in the Davos Congress Centre under the patronage of the European Commission and European industrial associations, where Schwab sought to introduce European firms to American management practices. He then founded the WEF as a nonprofit organization based in Geneva and drew European business leaders to Davos for the annual meetings each January.

The second European Management Forum in 1972 was the first meeting where a head of government featured as a speaker, Prime Minister Pierre Werner of Luxembourg.

Events in 1973, including the collapse of the Bretton Woods fixed-exchange rate mechanism and the Yom Kippur War, saw the annual meeting expand its focus from management to economic and social issues, and, for the first time, political leaders were invited to the annual meeting in January 1974.

Through the forum's first decade, it maintained a playful atmosphere, with many members skiing and participating in evening events. Appraising the 1981 event, one attendee noted that "the forum offers a delightful vacation on the expense account".

Political leaders soon began to use the annual meeting as venue for promoting their interests. The Davos Declaration was signed in 1988 by Greece and Turkey, helping them turn back from the brink of war. In 1992, South African president F. W. de Klerk met with Nelson Mandela and Chief Mangosuthu Buthelezi at the annual meeting, their first joint appearance outside South Africa. At the 1994 annual meeting, Israeli foreign minister Shimon Peres and PLO chairman Yasser Arafat reached a draft agreement on Gaza and Jericho. The "Davos Pact" of 1996 saw the forum's elite help Boris Yeltsin retain power as president of the Russian Federation over the then-presumptive favorite Gennady Zyuganov, leader of the Communist Party of the Russian Federation.

After 9/11, the WEF was held in the US, in New York City, for the first time. And in January 2003, US secretary of state Powell went to the forum to drum up sympathy for the global war on terrorism and the US's impending invasion of Iraq.

In October 2004, the World Economic Forum gained attention through the resignation of its CEO and executive director José María Figueres over the undeclared receipt of more than US$900,000 in consultancy fees from the French telecommunications firm Alcatel. Transparency International highlighted this incident in their Global Corruption Report two years later in 2006.

In January 2006, the WEF published an article in its Global Agenda magazine titled "Boycott Israel", which was distributed to all 2,340 participants of the annual meeting. Following the publication, Klaus Schwab described the publication as "an unacceptable failure in the editorial process".

In late 2015, the invitation was extended to include a North Korean delegation for the 2016 WEF, "in view of positive signs coming out of the country", the WEF organizers noted. North Korea has not been attending the WEF since 1998. The invitation was accepted. However, WEF revoked the invitation on 13 January 2016, after the 6 January 2016 North Korean nuclear test, and the country's attendance was made subject to "existing and possible forthcoming sanctions". Despite protests by North Korea calling the decision by the WEF managing board a "sudden and irresponsible" move, the WEF committee maintained the exclusion because "under these circumstances there would be no opportunity for international dialogue".

In 2017, the WEF in Davos attracted considerable attention when, for the first time, a head of state from the People's Republic of China was present at the alpine resort. With the backdrop of Brexit, an incoming protectionist US administration and significant pressures on free-trade zones and trade agreements, Paramount leader Xi Jinping defended the global economic scheme, and portrayed China as a responsible nation and a leader for environmental causes. He sharply rebuked the current populist movements that would introduce tariffs and hinder global commerce, warning that such protectionism could foster isolation and reduced economic opportunity.

In 2018, Indian prime minister Narendra Modi gave the keynote speech, becoming the first head of government from India to deliver the inaugural keynote for the annual plenary at Davos. Modi highlighted global warming (climate change), terrorism and protectionism as the three major global challenges, and expressed confidence that they can be tackled with collective effort.

In 2019, Brazilian president Jair Bolsonaro gave the keynote address at the plenary session of the conference. On his first international trip to Davos, he emphasized liberal economic policies despite his populist agenda, and attempted to reassure the world that Brazil is a protector of the rainforest while utilizing its resources for food production and export. He stated that "his government will seek to better integrate Brazil into the world by mainstreaming international best practices, such as those adopted and promoted by the OECD". Environmental concerns like extreme weather events, and the failure of climate change mitigation and adaptation were among the top-ranking global risks expressed by WEF attendees. On 13 June 2019, the WEF and the United Nations signed a "Strategic Partnership Framework" in order to "jointly accelerate the implementation of the 2030 Agenda for Sustainable Development".

The 2021 World Economic Forum was due to be held from 17 to 20 August in Singapore. However, on 17 May, the forum was cancelled; with a new meeting to take place in the first half of 2022 instead with a final location and date to be determined later in 2021.

In late December 2021, the World Economic Forum said in a release that pandemic conditions had made it extremely difficult to stage a global in-person meeting the following month; transmissibility of the SARS-CoV-2 Omicron variant and its impact on travel and mobility had made deferral necessary, with the meeting in Davos eventually rescheduled for 22 to 26 May 2022.

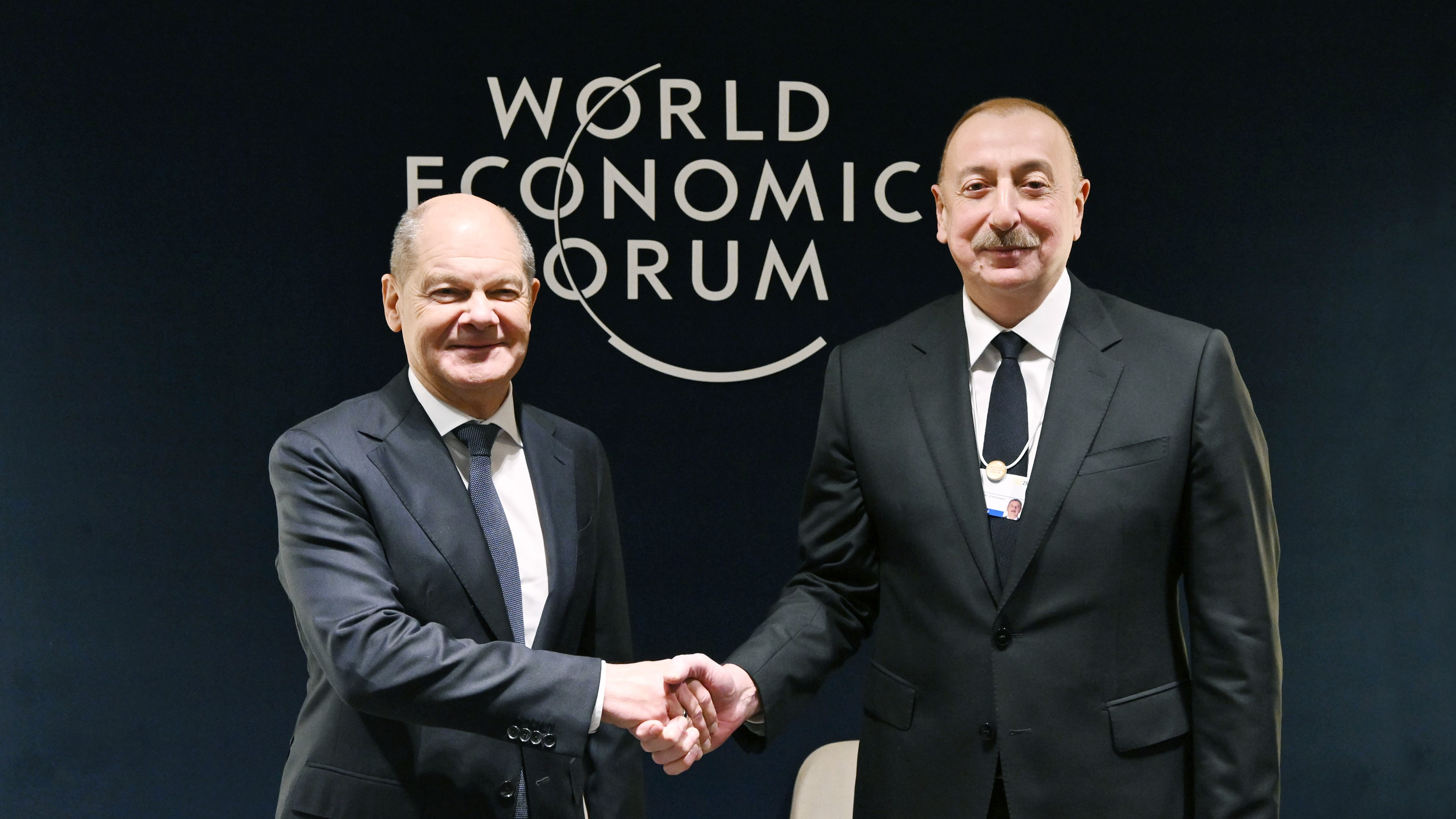
German chancellor Olaf Scholz and Azerbaijani president Ilham Aliyev in January 2025

Topics in the 2022 annual meeting included the Russian invasion of Ukraine, climate change, energy insecurity and inflation. Ukraine's president Volodymyr Zelenskyy gave a special address at the meeting, thanking the global community for its efforts but also calling for more support. The 2022 forum was marked by the absence of a Russian delegation for the first time since 1991, which The Wall Street Journal described as signalling the "unraveling of globalization". The former Russia House was used to present Russia's war crimes.

The 2023 annual meeting of the World Economic Forum took place in Davos, Switzerland, from 16 to 20 January under the theme "Cooperation in a fragmented world".

On 21 April 2025 Klaus Schwab, Chairman of the Board of the World Economic Forum, informed the Board: "Following my recent announcement and as I enter my 88th year, I have decided to step down from my position as Chair and as a member of the Board of Trustees, with immediate effect."

In August 2025, the Forum faced renewed scrutiny after whistleblowers alleged financial irregularities and a toxic work environment. Interim chair Peter Brabeck-Letmathe, former CEO of Nestlé, resigned citing his personal observations of such conditions. Although an internal investigation by the Zurich-based law firm Homburger and US firm Covington & Burling found no evidence of "material wrongdoing" by Schwab or his wife Hilde, the Board pledged to strengthen governance structures. At the same time, the Forum appointed Larry Fink, CEO of BlackRock, and André Hoffmann, vice-chair of Roche Holding, as interim co-chairs of its board.

In February 2026, Børge Brende, head of the World Economic Forum, resigned over his relationship with convicted sex offender Jeffrey Epstein.

== Organization ==
Headquartered in Cologny, the WEF also has offices in New York, Beijing, Tokyo and Seoul. In January 2015, it was designated an NGO with "other international body" status by the Swiss Federal Government under the Swiss Host-State Act.

In October 2016, the WEF announced the opening of its new Center for the Fourth Industrial Revolution in San Francisco. According to the WEF, the center will "serve as a platform for interaction, insight and impact on the scientific and technological changes that are changing the way we live, work and relate to one another". WEF has 19 such centers spread across Africa, Asia, Europe, North America and South America.

The World Economic Forum declares that it is impartial and that it is not tied to any political, partisan, or national interests. Until 2012, it had observer status with the United Nations Economic and Social Council; it is under the supervision of the Swiss Federal Council. The foundation's highest governance body is the foundation board.

The managing board is chaired by the WEF's president and CEO and acts as the executive body of the World Economic Forum. Managing board members are WEF's president and CEO, Julien Gattoni, Jeremy Jurgens, Adrian Monck, Sarita Nayyar, Olivier M. Schwab, Saadia Zahidi, and Alois Zwinggi.

=== Board of trustees ===
The WEF was chaired by founder and chairman Klaus Schwab until his departure in 2025 and is guided by a board of trustees that is made up of leaders from business, politics, academia and civil society.

As of 2024, the board of trustees was composed of: Queen Rania of Jordan, Mukesh Ambani, Ajay Banga, Marc Benioff, Peter Brabeck-Letmathe, Thomas Buberl, Laurence D. Fink, Chrystia Freeland, Orit Gadiesh, Kristalina Georgieva, Fabiola Gianotti, Al Gore, Andre Hoffmann, Paula Ingabire, Joe Kaeser, Christine Lagarde, Yo-Yo Ma, Patrice Motsepe, Ngozi Okonjo-Iweala, Lubna Olayan, David Rubenstein, Ulf Mark Schneider, Klaus Schwab, Tharman Shanmugaratnam, Jim Hagemann Snabe, Julie Sweet, Feike Sijbesma, Heizō Takenaka, and Zhu Min.

Members of the board of trustees (past or present) include: Al Gore, Herman Gref, André Hoffmann, Carlos Ghosn, Christine Lagarde, Chrystia Freeland, David Rubenstein, Ernesto Zedillo, Fabiola Gianotti, Feike Sijbesma, Heizō Takenaka, Indra Nooyi, Jack Ma, Jim Hagemann Snabe, José Ángel Gurría, Josef Ackermann, Klaus Schwab, Kofi Annan, Laurence Fink, Leo Rafael Reif, Luis Alberto Moreno, Marc Benioff, Mark Carney, Maurice Lévy, Michael Dell, Mukesh Ambani, Muriel Pénicaud, Niall FitzGerald, Orit Gadiesh, Peter Brabeck-Letmathe, Peter Maurer, Queen Rania of Jordan, Rajat Gupta, Susan Hockfield, Tharman Shanmugaratnam, Tony Blair, Ulf Mark Schneider, Ursula von der Leyen, Yo-Yo Ma, Zhu Min, Ivan Pictet, Joseph P. Schoendorf, Peter D. Sutherland, and Victor L.L. Chu.

=== Membership ===
The foundation is funded by its 1,000 member companies, typically global enterprises with more than five billion dollars in turnover (varying by industry and region). These enterprises rank among the top companies within their industry and/or country and play a leading role in shaping the future of their industry and/or region. Membership is stratified by the level of engagement with forum activities, with the level of membership fees increasing as participation in meetings, projects, and initiatives rises. In 2011, an annual membership cost $52,000 for an individual member, $263,000 for "Industry Partner" and $527,000 for "Strategic Partner". An admission fee costs $19,000 per person. In 2014, WEF raised annual fees by 20 percent, bringing the cost for "Strategic Partner" from CHF 500,000 ($523,000) to CHF 600,000 ($628,000).

== Activities ==
=== Annual meeting in Davos ===
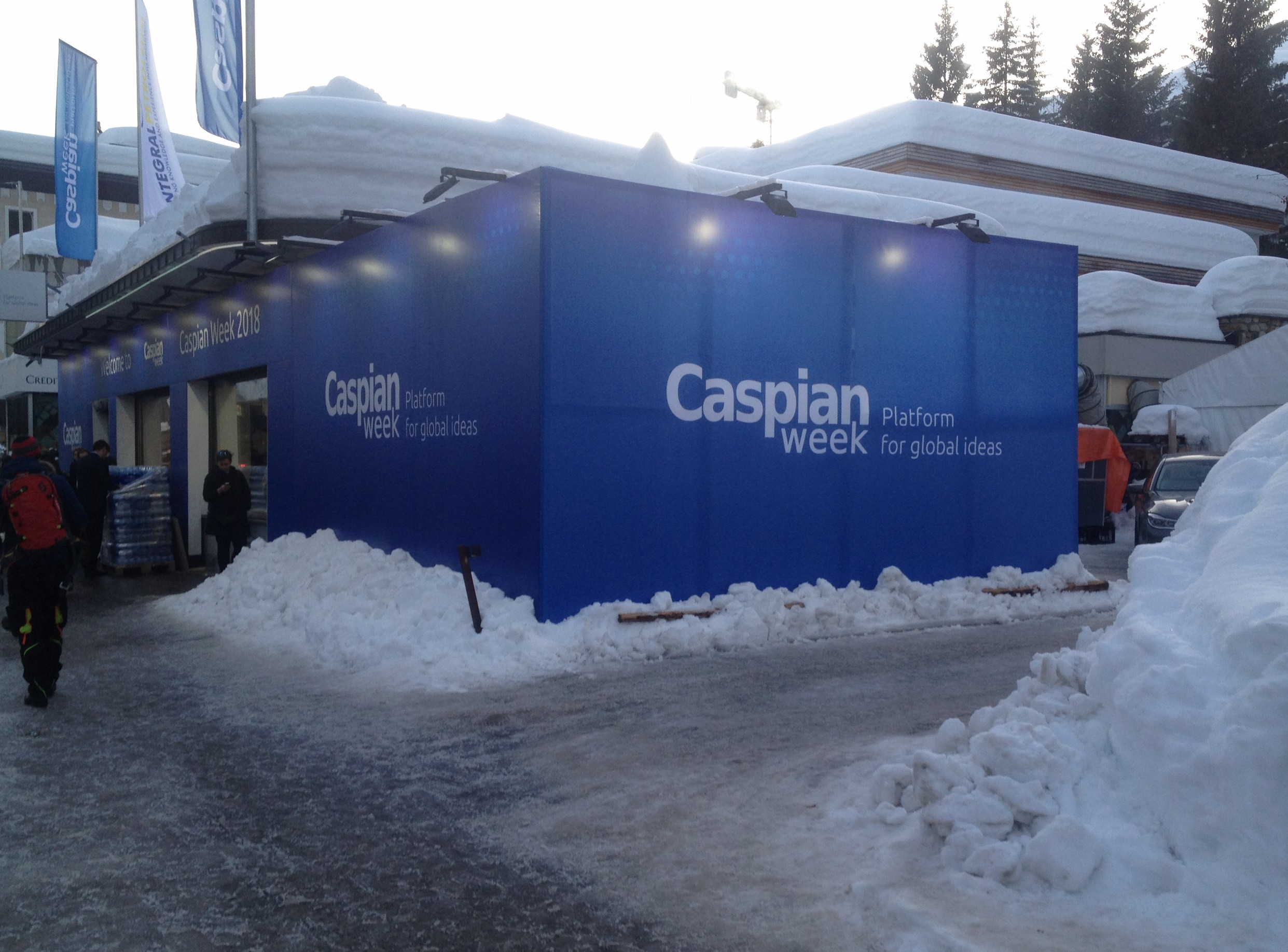
A sports shop turned into a temporary informal reception location "Caspian Week", WEF 2018.

The flagship event of the World Economic Forum is the invitation-only annual meeting held at the end of January in Davos, Switzerland, bringing together chief executive officers from its 1,000 member companies, as well as selected politicians, representatives from academia, NGOs, religious leaders, and the media in an alpine environment. The winter discussions ostensibly focus around key issues of global concern (such as the globalization, capital markets, wealth management, international conflicts, environmental problems and their possible solutions). The participants also take part in role playing events, such as the Investment Heat Map. Informal winter meetings may have led to as many ideas and solutions as the official sessions. In addition to the official programme inside the Congress Hall, numerous independent (by invitation only) events are hosted by governments, corporations, and civil-society organisations across Davos. These include the FT/CNBC Nightcap, Open Forum, the Swedish Lunch, Goals House, and SAP House and Avicii Tribute Concert for Mental Health Awareness.

At the annual meeting, usually 3,000 participants from nearly 110 countries participate in over 400 sessions. Participation included more than 340 public figures, including more than 70 heads of state and government and 45 heads of international organizations; 230 media representatives and almost 40 cultural leaders were represented.

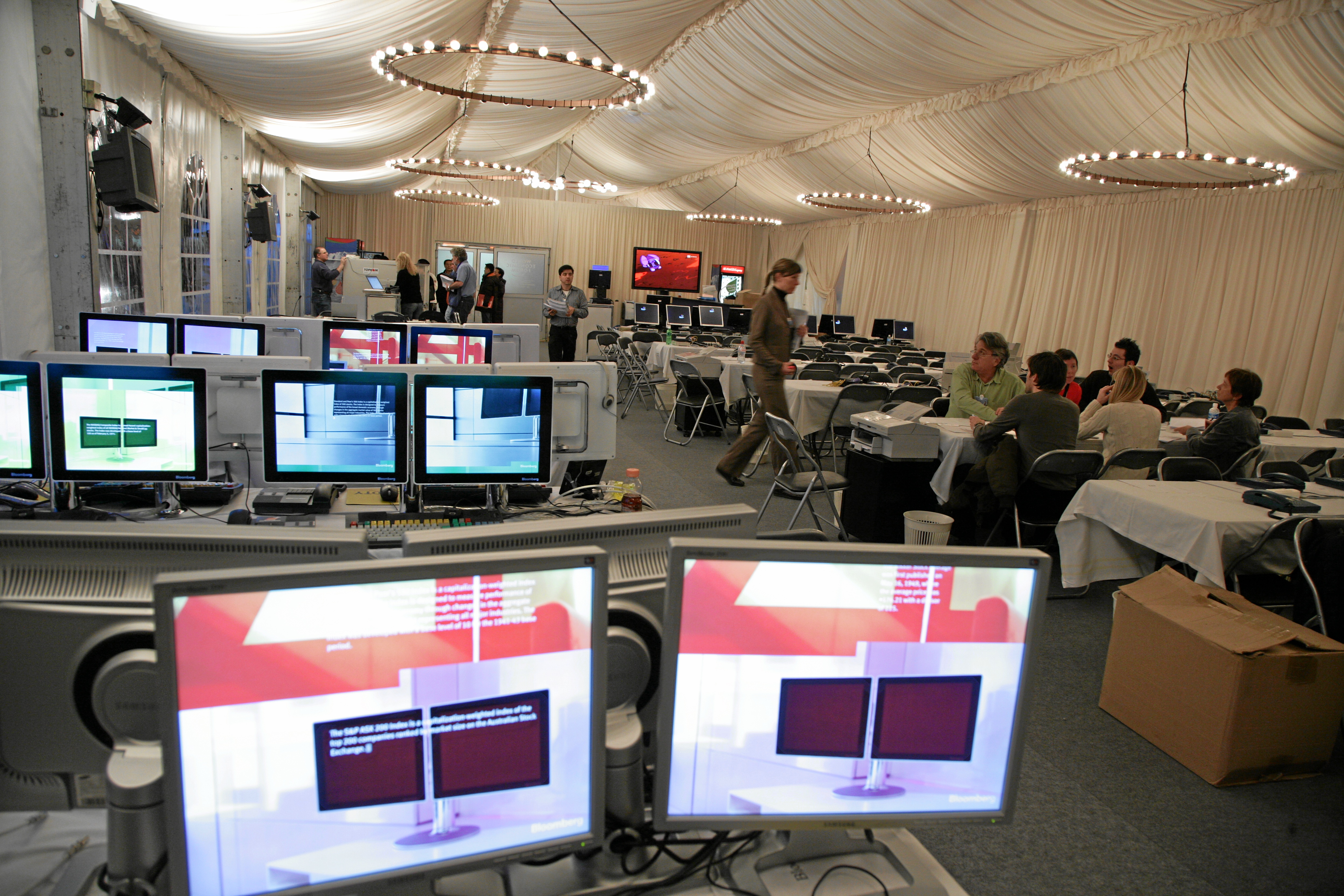
Inside the Media Centre, 2007

As many as 500 journalists from online, print, radio, and television take part, with access to all sessions in the official program, some of which are also webcast. Not all the journalists are given access to all areas, however. This is reserved for white badge holders. "Davos runs an almost caste-like system of badges", according to BBC journalist Anthony Reuben. "A white badge means you're one of the delegates – you might be the chief executive of a company or the leader of a country (although that would also get you a little holographic sticker to add to your badge), or a senior journalist. An orange badge means you're just a run-of-the-mill working journalist." Since 2024 the WEF launched a new badge system where Accredited Badges are issued. These badges have access to the Ice Village, which is a smaller version of the official Congress Hall. All plenary debates from the annual meeting also are available on YouTube while photographs are available on Flickr.

==== Badge categories ====
Annual meeting access levels provided by badge type
| Badge type | Description |
|---|---|
| WEF Delegate Badge (white badge) | Highest-level official WEF badge. Grants access to the Congress Centre, official sessions, and most restricted areas. Senior delegates such as heads of state may have additional holographic markers. |
| Red / yellow / orange badge | Official WEF badge issued to drivers, body guards, journalists, granting access to press areas and some official sessions, with some restrictions. |
| Accredited Badge | Official WEF badge introduced in 2024. Does not allow access to the Congress Centre, but grants access to secure hotels and to the Ice Village, a smaller version of the official Congress Hall. |
| Secure Hotel Badge | Not an official WEF badge. Provides access only to secure hotels, allowing passage through police-controlled security perimeters for meetings and private lounges used by delegations and partners. |

Overview of past annual meetings
| Year | Dates | Theme |
|---|---|---|
| 1988 | | The new state of the world economy |
| 1989 | | Key developments in the 90s: implications for global business |
| 1990 | | Competitive cooperation in a decade of turbulence |
| 1991 | | The new direction for global leadership |
| 1992 | | Global cooperation and megacompetition |
| 1993 | | Rallying all the forces for global recovery |
| 1994 | | Redefining the basic assumptions of the world economy |
| 1995 | 26–30 January | Leadership for challenges beyond growth |
| 1996 | 1–6 February | Sustaining globalization |
| 1997 | 30 January – 4 February | Building the network society |
| 1998 | 29 January – 3 February | Managing volatility and priorities for the 21st century |
| 1999 | 28 January – 2 February | Responsible globality: managing the impact of globalization |
| 2000 | 26 January – 2 February | New beginnings: making a difference |
| 2001 | 25–30 January | Sustaining growth and bridging the divides: a framework for our global future |
| 2002 | 31 January – 4 February | Leadership in fragile times (held in New York instead of Davos) |
| 2003 | 21–25 January | Building trust |
| 2004 | 21–25 January | Partnering for security and prosperity |
| 2005 | 26–30 January | Taking responsibility for tough choices |
| 2006 | 25–29 January | The creative imperative |
| 2007 | 24–28 January | Shaping the global agenda, the shifting power equation |
| 2008 | 23–27 January | The power of collaborative innovation |
| 2009 | 28 January – 1 February | Shaping the post-crisis world |
| 2010 | 27–30 January | Improve the state of the world: rethink, redesign, rebuild |
| 2011 | 26–30 January | Shared norms for the new reality |
| 2012 | 25–29 January | The great transformation: shaping new models |
| 2013 | 23–27 January | Resilient dynamism |
| 2014 | 22–25 January | The reshaping of the world: consequences for society, politics and business |
| 2015 | 21–24 January | New global context |
| 2016 | 20–23 January | Mastering the fourth industrial revolution |
| 2017 | 17–20 January | Responsive and responsible leadership |
| 2018 | 23–26 January | Creating a shared future in a fractured world |
| 2019 | 22–25 January | Globalization 4.0: shaping a global architecture in the age of the fourth industrial revolution |
| 2020 | 20–24 January | Stakeholders for a cohesive and sustainable world |
| 2021 | 17–20 August | Crucial Year to Rebuild Trust, canceled as a result of COVID-19 pandemic |
| 2022 | 22–26 May | History at a Turning Point: Government Policies and Business Strategies |
| 2023 | 16–20 January | Cooperation in a Fragmented World |
| 2024 | 15–19 January | Rebuilding Trust |
| 2025 | 20–24 January | Collaboration for the Intelligent Age |
| 2026 | 19–23 January | A Spirit of Dialogue |

==== Secure hotels and secure zone ====
The town of Davos is designated as a high-security zone during the annual meeting, with extensive protective measures led by the Swiss authorities. Security operations include airspace monitoring, military deployments, and the protection of key sites and official delegations. The Swiss Armed Forces support the Canton of Graubünden with troops, infrastructure, and specialised units to safeguard participants and residents. Access to parts of the town is restricted, with secure hotels and controlled zones requiring specific accreditation to enter.

A number of hotels in Davos are designated as "secure hotels", providing controlled access and heightened protection for heads of state, ministers and senior officials. The specific hotels receiving this status vary from year to year, but have included the Belvedere Hotel, the Alpengold Hotel (formerly the InterContinental), the Seehof Hotel, and the Hilton Garden Inn. These properties fall within the Secure Zone (Promenade 95 – 101) and require special accreditation for entry (Secure Hotel Badge), functioning as protected accommodation and meeting zones for official delegations during the World Economic Forum. The Belvedere also hosts the Main Stage, a dedicated venue for high-level discussions and gatherings during the Annual Meeting. Located within the secure hotel environment, the space brings together world leaders, government and other participants for engagements outside the Congress Centre.

==== 2025 meeting ====
The World Economic Forum 2025 took place in Davos, Switzerland, from 20 to 24 January, under the theme Collaboration for the Intelligent Age. The event brought together approximately 3,000 global leaders from over 125 countries, including 350 heads of state and government, business executives, policymakers, and representatives from international organizations. Discussions focused on geopolitical stability, economic resilience, climate change, artificial intelligence governance, and inclusive economic growth. Sessions covered topics such as the future of global trade, energy transition, and the impact of artificial intelligence and automation on the labor market. Several initiatives were introduced, including policy frameworks for AI regulation, climate financing mechanisms, and economic strategies for sustainable development.

Among the initiatives discussed was the Global India Dialogues, launched by the Motwani Jadeja Foundation, which focused on India’s role in global geopolitics, technology, and innovation. Discussions on gender equity and economic inclusion were also highlighted through initiatives such as the Global Good Alliance for Gender Equity and Equality, which explored the economic impact of investments in women's health. The event featured key figures such as Ursula von der Leyen, Antony Blinken, Christian Lindner, and Sam Altman, alongside representatives from the United Nations, International Monetary Fund, and World Bank. The forum underscored the importance of international cooperation in addressing global economic and technological challenges.

==== Individual participants ====
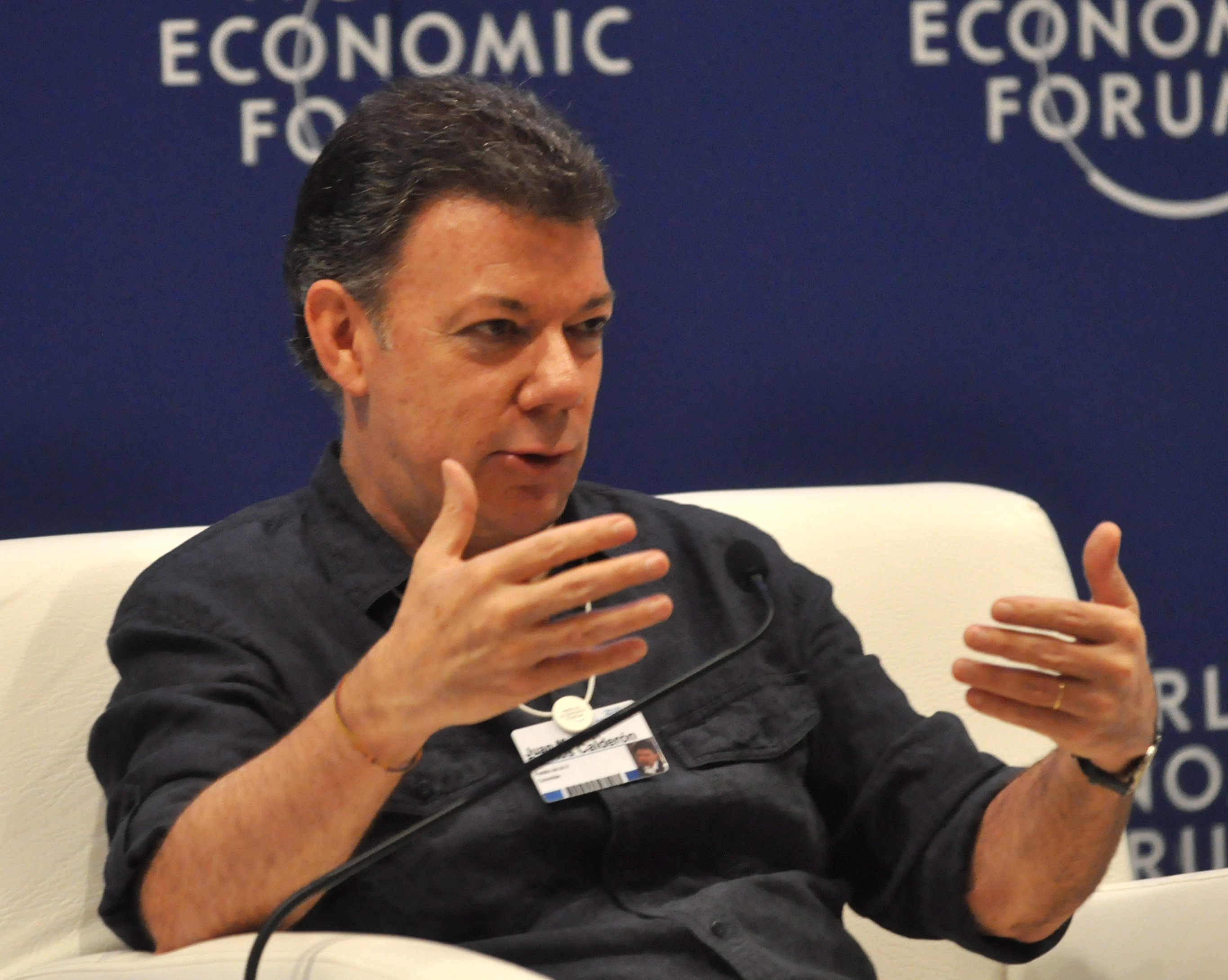
Juan Manuel Santos, president of Colombia, at the 2010 World Economic Forum

Some 3,000 individual participants joined the 2020 annual meeting in Davos. Countries with the most attendees include the United States (674 participants), the United Kingdom (270), Switzerland (159), Germany (137) and India (133). Among the attendees were heads of state or government, cabinet ministers, ambassadors, and heads or senior officials of international organizations, including: Sanna Marin (prime minister of Finland), Ursula von der Leyen (president of the European Commission), Christine Lagarde (ECB president), Greta Thunberg (climate activist), Ren Zhengfei (Huawei Technologies founder), Kristalina Georgieva (managing director of the IMF), Deepika Padukone (Bollywood actress), George Soros (investor), Hideki Makihara (House of Representatives Japan), and Donald Trump (president of the United States).

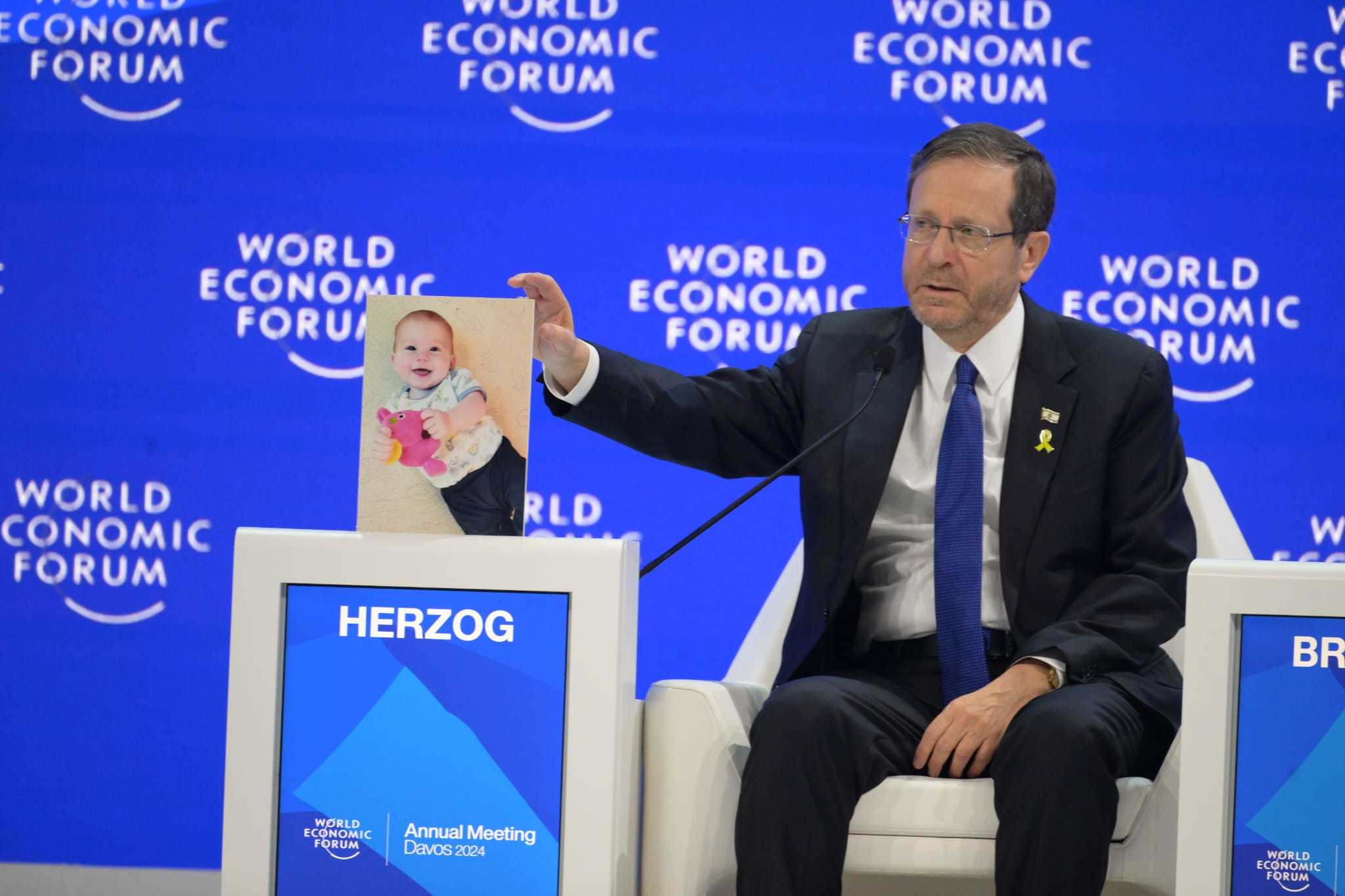
Israeli President Isaac Herzog at the 2024 World Economic Forum

An analysis by The Economist from 2014 found that the vast majority of participants are male and more than 50 years old. Careers in business account for most of the participants' backgrounds (1,595 conference attendees), with the remaining seats shared between government (364), NGOs (246) and press (234). Academia, which had been the basis of the first annual conference in 1971, had been marginalised to the smallest participant group (183 attendees).

==== Corporate participants ====
Next to individual participants, the World Economic Forum maintains a dense network of corporate partners that can apply for different partnership ranks within the forum. For 2019, Bloomberg has identified a total of 436 listed corporates that participated in the annual meeting while measuring a stock underperformance by the Davos participants of around −10% versus the S&P 500 during the same year. Drivers are among others an overrepresentation of financial companies and an underrepresentation of fast-growing health care and information technology businesses at the conference. The Economist had found similar results in an earlier study, showing an underperformance of Davos participants against both the MSCI World Index and the S&P 500 between 2009 and 2014.

=== Summer annual meeting ===
In 2007, the foundation established the Annual Meeting of the New Champions (also called Summer Davos), held annually in China, alternating between Dalian and Tianjin, bringing together 1,500 participants from what the foundation calls Global Growth Companies, primarily from rapidly growing emerging countries such as China, Russia, Mexico, and Brazil, but also including quickly growing companies from developed countries. The meeting also engages with the next generation of global leaders from fast-growing regions and competitive cities, as well as technology pioneers from around the globe. The premier of China has delivered a plenary address at each annual meeting.

=== Regional meetings ===
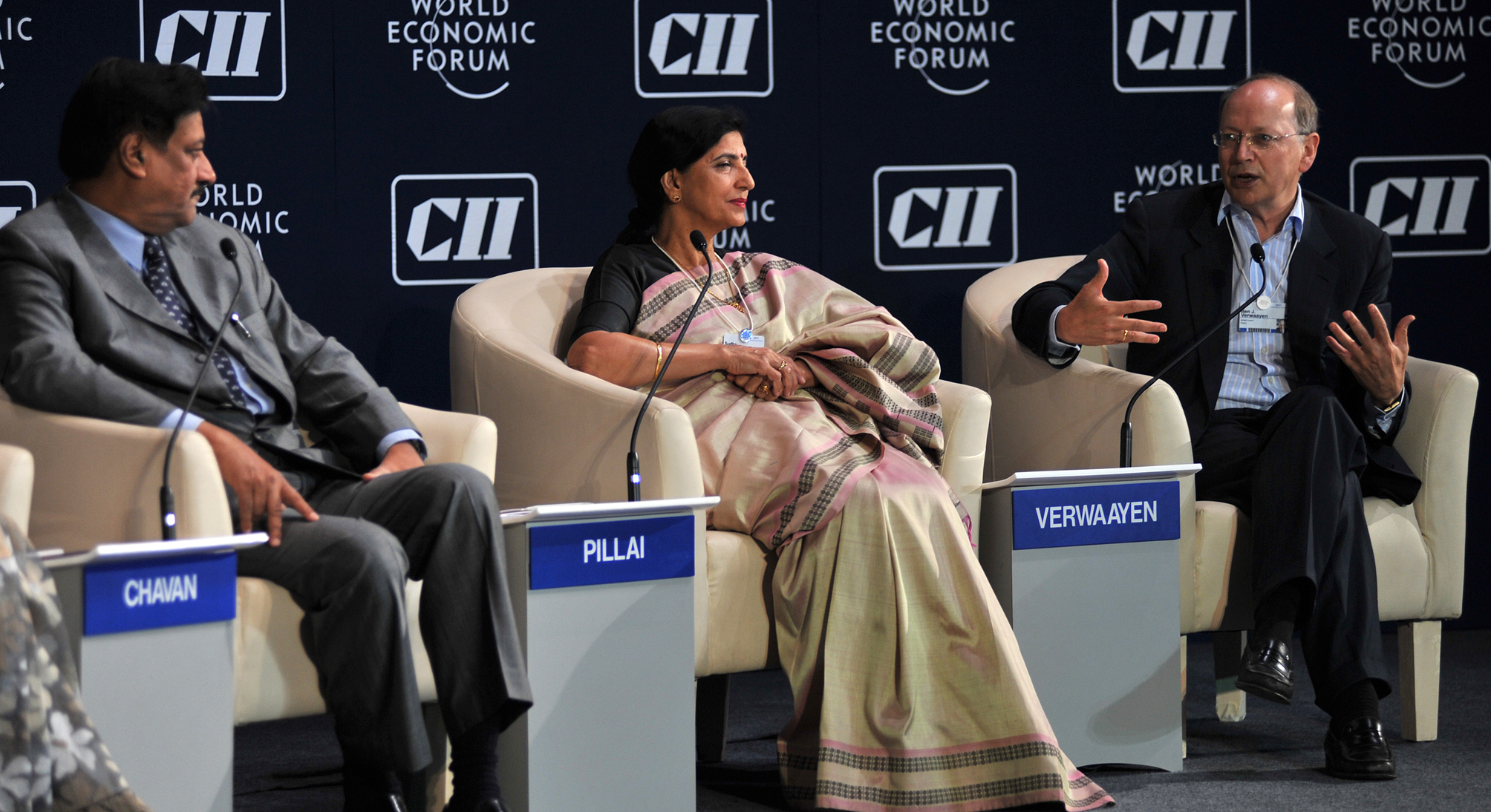
Prithviraj Chavan, chief minister of Maharashtra, India; Sudha Pilay, member-secretary, Planning Commission, India; and Ben Verwaayen, chief executive officer, Alcatel-Lucent, France, were the co-chairs of the India Economic Summit 2011 in Mumbai.

Every year regional meetings take place, enabling close contact among corporate business leaders, local government leaders, and NGOs. Meetings are held in Africa, East Asia, Latin America, and the Middle East. The mix of hosting countries varies from year to year, but consistently China and India have hosted throughout the decade since 2000.

=== Young Global Leaders ===
The group of Young Global Leaders consists of 800 people chosen by the WEF organizers as being representative of contemporary leadership. After five years of participation they are considered alumni. The program has received controversy when Schwab, the founder, admitted to "penetrat[ing]" governments with Young Global Leaders. He added that as of 2017 "more than half" of Justin Trudeau's Cabinet had been members of the program.

=== Social entrepreneurs ===
Since 2000, the WEF has been promoting models developed by those in close collaboration with the Schwab Foundation for Social Entrepreneurship, highlighting social entrepreneurship as a key element to advance societies and address social problems. Selected social entrepreneurs are invited to participate in the foundation's regional meetings and the annual meetings where they may meet chief executives and senior government officials. At the annual meeting 2003, for example, Jeroo Billimoria met with Roberto Blois, deputy secretary-general of the International Telecommunication Union, an encounter that produced a key partnership for her organization Child Helpline International.

=== Research reports ===
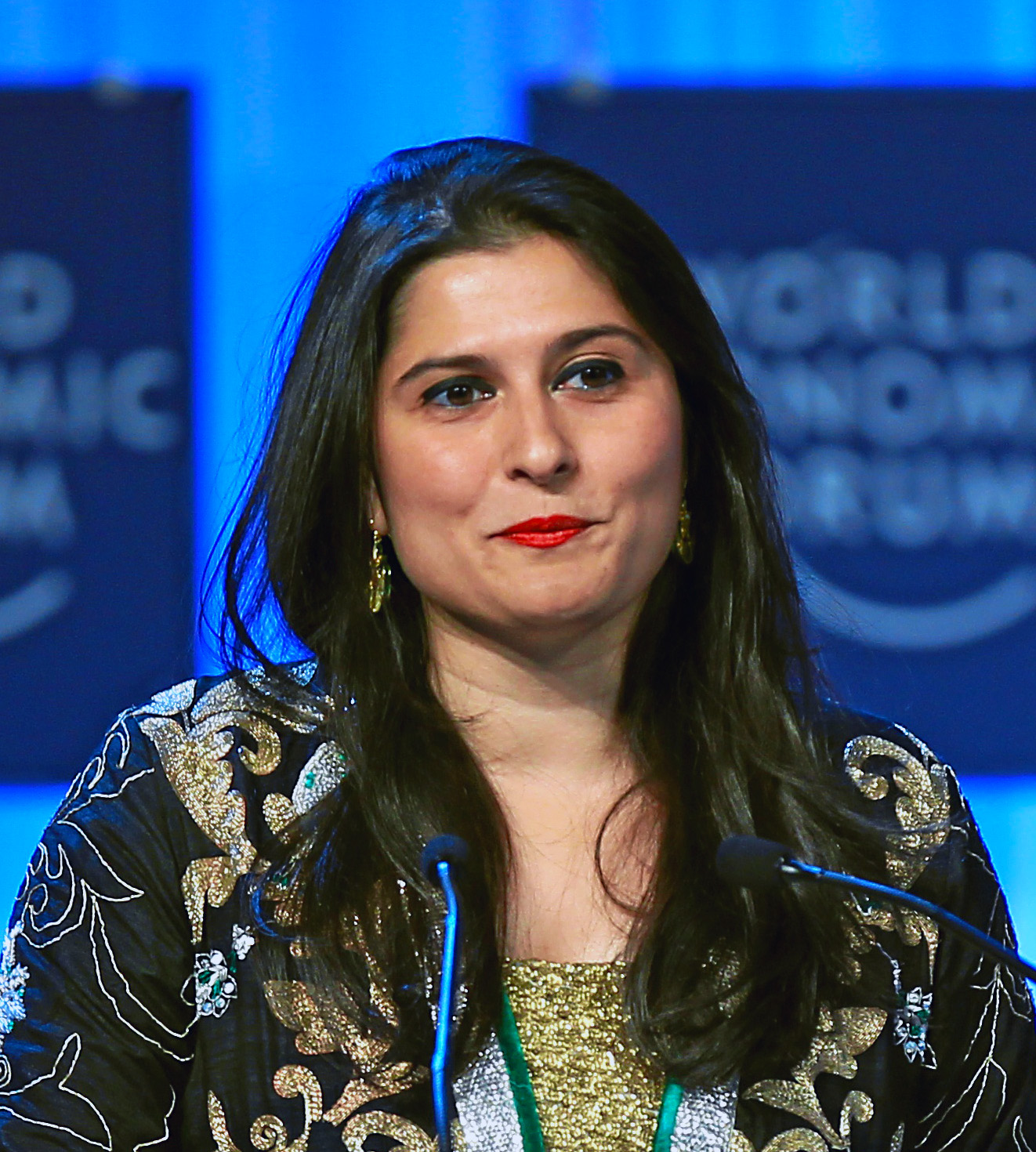
Two-time Academy Award winner and Pakistani journalist Sharmeen Obaid-Chinoy at WEF in 2013

The foundation also acts as a think tank, publishing a wide range of reports. In particular, "Strategic Insight Teams" focus on producing reports of relevance in the fields of competitiveness, global risks, and scenario thinking.

The "Competitiveness Team" produces a range of annual economic reports (first published in brackets): the Global Competitiveness Report (1979) measured competitiveness of countries and economies; the Global Information Technology Report (2001) assessed their competitiveness based on their IT readiness; the Global Gender Gap Report examined critical areas of inequality between men and women; the Global Risks Report (2006) assessed key global risks; the Global Travel and Tourism Report (2007) measured travel and tourism competitiveness; the Financial Development Report (2008) aimed to provide a comprehensive means for countries to establish benchmarks for various aspects of their financial systems and establish priorities for improvement; and the Global Enabling Trade Report (2008) presented a cross-country analysis of the large number of measures facilitating trade among nations.

The "Risk Response Network" produces a yearly report assessing risks which are deemed to be within the scope of these teams, have cross-industry relevance, are uncertain, have the potential to cause upwards of US$10 billion in economic damage, have the potential to cause major human suffering, and which require a multi-stakeholder approach for mitigation.

In 2020, the forum published a report entitled Nature Risk Rising: Why the Crisis Engulfing Nature Matters for Business and the Economy. In this report the forum estimated that approximately half of global GDP is highly or moderately dependent on nature (the same as IPBES's 2019 assessment report). The report also found that 1 dollar spent on nature restoration yields 9 dollars in economic benefits.

=== Initiatives ===
==== Health ====
On 19 January 2017 the Coalition for Epidemic Preparedness Innovations (CEPI), a global initiative to fight epidemics, was launched at WEF in Davos. The internationally funded initiative aims at securing vaccine supplies for global emergencies and pandemics, and to research new vaccines for tropical diseases, that are now more menacing. The project is funded by private and governmental donors, with an initial investment of US$460m from the governments of Germany, Japan and Norway, plus the Bill & Melinda Gates Foundation and the Wellcome Trust.

Between 21 and 24 January 2020, at the early stages of the COVID-19 outbreak, CEPI met with leaders from Moderna to establish plans for a COVID-19 vaccine at the Davos gathering, with a total global case number of 274 and total loss of life the virus at 16. The WHO declared a global health emergency 6 days later.

==== Society ====
The Global Water Initiative brings together diverse stakeholders such as Alcan Inc., the Swiss Agency for Development and Cooperation, USAID India, UNDP India, Confederation of Indian Industry (CII), Government of Rajasthan, and the NEPAD Business Foundation to develop public-private partnerships on water management in South Africa and India.

In an effort to combat corruption, the Partnering Against Corruption Initiative (PACI) was launched by CEOs from the engineering and construction, energy and metals, and mining industries at the annual meeting in Davos during January 2004. PACI is a platform for peer exchange on practical experience and dilemma situations. Approximately 140 companies have joined the initiative.

==== Environment ====
In the beginning of the 21st century, the forum began to increasingly deal with environmental issues. In the Davos Manifesto 2020 it is said that a company among other:

- "acts as a steward of the environmental and material universe for future generations. It consciously protects our biosphere and champions a circular, shared and regenerative economy."
- "responsibly manages near-term, medium-term and long-term value creation in pursuit of sustainable shareholder returns that do not sacrifice the future for the present."
- "is more than an economic unit generating wealth. It fulfils human and societal aspirations as part of the broader social system. Performance must be measured not only on the return to shareholders, but also on how it achieves its environmental, social and good governance objectives."

The Environmental Initiative covers climate change and water issues. Under the Gleneagles Dialogue on Climate Change, the U.K. government asked the World Economic Forum at the G8 Summit in Gleneagles in 2005 to facilitate a dialogue with the business community to develop recommendations for reducing greenhouse gas emissions. This set of recommendations, endorsed by a global group of CEOs, was presented to leaders ahead of the G8 Summit in Toyako, Hokkaido, Japan held in July 2008.

In 2016 WEF published an article in which it is said, that in some cases reducing consumption can increase well-being. In the article is mentioned that in Costa Rica the GDP is 4 times smaller than in many countries in Western Europe and North America, but people live longer and better. An American study shows that those whose income is higher than $75,000, do not necessarily have an increase in well-being. To better measure well-being, the New Economics Foundation's launched the Happy Planet Index.

In January 2017, WEF launched the Platform for Accelerating the Circular Economy (PACE), which is a global public private partnership seeking to scale circular economy innovations. PACE is co-chaired by Frans van Houten (CEO of Philips), Naoko Ishii (CEO of the Global Environment Facility, and the head of United Nations Environment Programme (UNEP). The Ellen MacArthur Foundation, the International Resource Panel, Circle Economy, Chatham House, the Dutch National Institute for Public Health and the Environment, the United Nations Environment Programme and Accenture serve as knowledge partners, and the program is supported by the UK Department for Environment, Food and Rural Affairs, DSM, FrieslandCampina, Global Affairs Canada, the Dutch Ministry of Infrastructure and Water Management, Rabobank, Shell, SITRA, and Unilever.

The Forum emphasized its 'Environment and Natural Resource Security Initiative' for the 2017 meeting to achieve inclusive economic growth and sustainable practices for global industries. With increasing limitations on world trade through national interests and trade barriers, the WEF has moved towards a more sensitive and socially-minded approach for global businesses with a focus on the reduction of carbon emissions in China and other large industrial nations.

Also in 2017, WEF launched the Fourth Industrial Revolution (4IR) for the Earth Initiative, a collaboration among WEF, Stanford University and PwC, and funded through the Mava Foundation. In 2018, WEF announced that one project within this initiative was to be the Earth BioGenome Project, the aim of which is to sequence the genomes of every organism on Earth.

The World Economic Forum is working to eliminate plastic pollution, stating that by 2050 it will consume 15% of the global carbon budget and will pass by its weight fishes in the world's oceans. One of the methods is to achieve circular economy.

The theme of the 2020 World Economic Forum annual meeting was 'Stakeholders for a Cohesive and Sustainable World'. Climate change and sustainability were central themes of discussion. Many argued that GDP is failed to represent correctly the wellbeing and that fossil fuel subsidies should be stopped. Many of the participants said that a better capitalism is needed. Al Gore summarized the ideas in the conference as: "The version of capitalism we have today in our world must be reformed".

In this meeting the World Economic Forum:

- Launched the Trillion Tree Campaign an initiative aiming to "grow, restore and conserve 1 trillion trees over the next 10 years around the world – in a bid to restore biodiversity and help fight climate change". Donald Trump joined the initiative. The forum stated that: "Nature-based solutions – locking-up carbon in the world's forests, grasslands and wetlands – can provide up to one-third of the emissions reductions required by 2030 to meet the Paris Agreement targets," adding that the rest should come from the heavy industry, finance and transportation sectors. One of the targets is to unify existing reforestation projects.
- Discussed the issue of climate change and called to expanding renewable energy, energy efficiency change the patterns of consumption and remove carbon from the atmosphere. The forum concluded that the climate crisis will become a climate apocalypse should the temperature rise by 2 °C above pre-industrial levels. The forum called on governments to fulfil the commitments in Paris Agreement. Jennifer Morgan, special representative for international climate policy of the Federal Foreign Office in Germany, said that as to the beginning of the forum, fossil fuels still get three times more money than climate solutions.

At the 2021 annual meeting UNFCCC launched the 'UN Race-to-Zero Emissions Breakthroughs'. The aim of the campaign is to transform 20 sectors of the economy in order to achieve zero greenhouse gas emissions. At least 20% of each sector should take specific measures, and 10 sectors should be transformed before COP 26 in Glasgow. According to the organizers, 20% is a tipping point, after which the whole sector begins to irreversibly change.

===== Coronavirus and green recovery =====
In April 2020, the forum published an article that postulates that the COVID-19 pandemic is linked to the destruction of nature. The number of emerging diseases is rising and this rise is linked to deforestation and species loss. In the article, there are multiple examples of the degradation of ecological systems caused by humans. It is also says that half of the global GDP is moderately or largely dependent on nature. The article concludes that the recovery from the pandemic should be linked to nature recovery.

The forum proposed a plan for a green recovery. The plan includes advancing circular economy. Among the mentioned methods, there is green building, sustainable transport, organic farming, urban open space, renewable energy and electric vehicles.

=== Global Shapers Community ===
The Global Shapers Community (GSC), an initiative of World Economic Forum, selects young leaders below 30 years old to be change agents in the world. Global Shapers develop and lead their city-based hubs to implement social justice projects that advance the mission of World Economic Forum. The GSC has over 10,000 members in 500+ hubs in 154 countries. Some critics see the WEF's increasing focus on activist areas such as environmental protection and social entrepreneurship as a strategy to disguise the true plutocratic goals of the organisation.

=== The Great Reset ===
In May 2020, the WEF and the then-Prince of Wales's Sustainable Markets Initiative launched "The Great Reset" project, a five-point plan to enhance sustainable economic growth following the global recession caused by the COVID-19 pandemic lockdowns. "The Great Reset" was to be the theme of WEF's annual meeting in August 2021.

According to forum founder Schwab, the intention of the project is to reconsider the meaning of capitalism and capital. While not abandoning capitalism, he proposes to change and possibly move on from some aspects of it, including neoliberalism and free-market fundamentalism. The role of corporations, taxation and more should be reconsidered. International cooperation and trade should be defended and the Fourth Industrial Revolution also.

The forum defines the system that it wants to create as "Stakeholder Capitalism". The forum supports trade unions.

The 'Great Reset' has also been the target of several "debunked" conspiracy theories, which heavily overlap with related conspiracy theories concerning the 'New World Order', Qanon, and COVID-19.

== Criticism ==
=== Physical protests ===
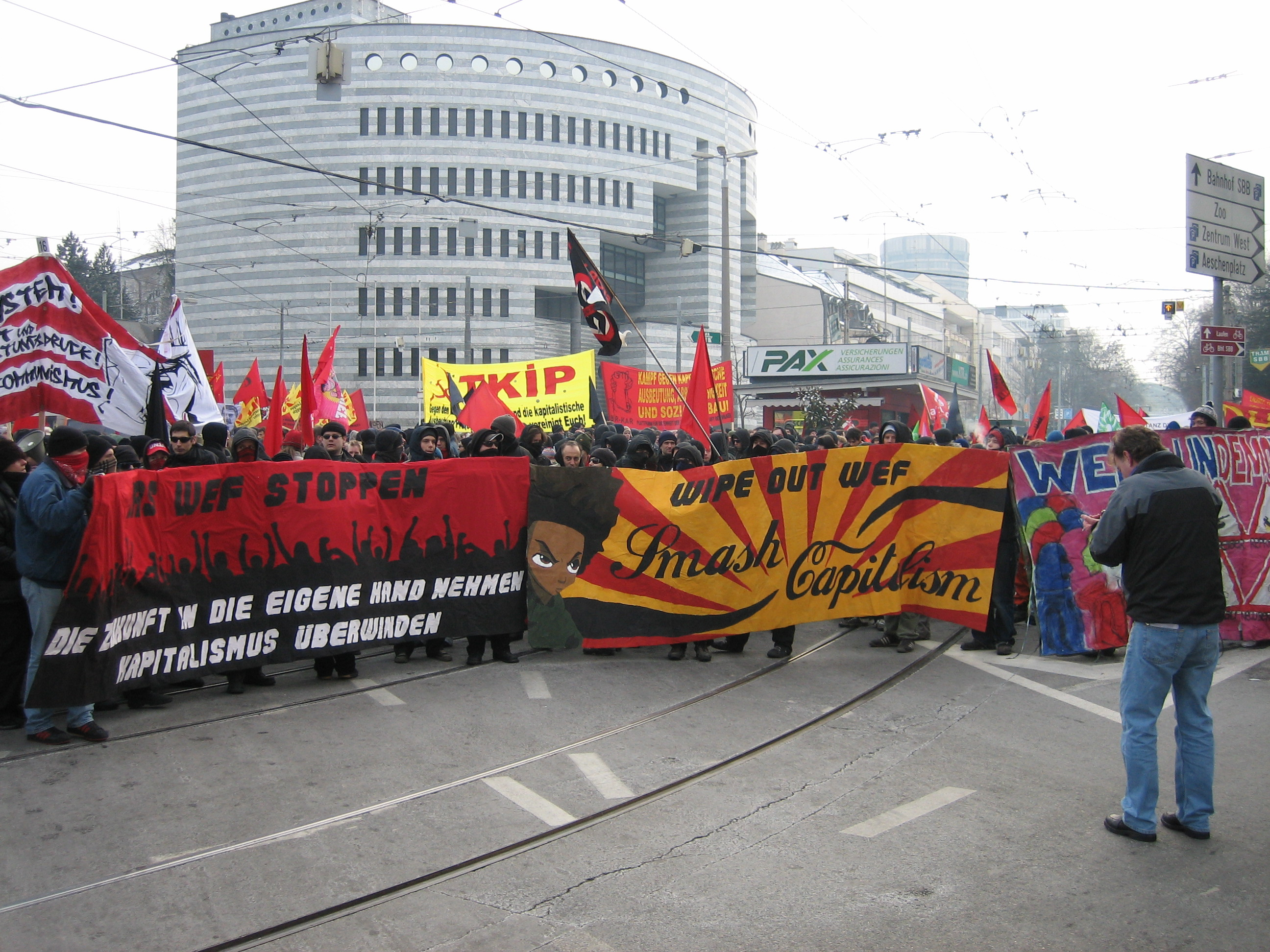
Protest march against the WEF in Basel, 2006

During the late 1990s, the WEF, as well as the G7, World Bank, World Trade Organization, and International Monetary Fund, came under heavy criticism by anti-globalization activists who asserted that capitalism and globalization were increasing poverty and destroying the environment. In 2000, about 10,000 demonstrators disrupted a regional WEF meeting in Melbourne, by obstructing the path of 200 delegates. Small demonstrations are held in Davos on most but not all years, organised by the local Green Party (see Anti-WEF protests in Switzerland, January 2003) to protest against what have been called the meetings of "fat cats in the snow", a tongue-in-cheek term used by rock singer Bono.

After 2014, the physical protest movement against the World Economic Forum largely died down, and Swiss police noted a significant decline in attending protesters, 20 at most during the meeting in 2016. While protesters are still more numerous in large Swiss cities, the protest movement itself has undergone significant change. Around 150 Tibetans and Uighurs protested in Geneva and 400 Tibetans in Bern against the visit of China's paramount leader Xi Jinping for the 2017 meeting, with subsequent confrontations and arrests.

=== Growing gaps in wealth ===
A number of NGOs have used the World Economic Forum to highlight growing inequalities and wealth gaps, which they consider to have been neglected, or even to be exacerbated, through institutions like the WEF. Winnie Byanyima, the former executive director of the anti-poverty confederation Oxfam International co-chaired the 2015 meeting, where she presented a critical report of global wealth distribution based on statistical research by the Credit Suisse Research Institute. In this study, the richest 1% of people in the world own 48% of the world's wealth. At the 2019 meeting, she presented another report in which she stated that the gap between rich and poor has widened. The report "Public Good or Private Wealth" stated that 2,200 billionaires worldwide saw their wealth grow by 12% while the poorest half saw its wealth fall by 11%. Oxfam calls for a global tax overhaul to increase and harmonise global tax rates for corporations and wealthy individuals.

"You'll own nothing and be happy" is a phrase adapted from an essay written by Ida Auken in 2016 for the WEF, pondering a future in which urban residents would rely on shared services for many expensive items such as appliances and vehicles. Shortly after its publication, a commentator for European Digital Rights criticized Auken's vision of centralized property ownership as a "benevolent dictatorship". During the COVID-19 pandemic, the phrase went viral, eliciting strongly negative reactions from mostly conservative but also some left-wing and unaffiliated commentators. Responding to viral social media posts based on the phrase, the WEF denied that it had a goal related to limiting ownership of private property.

Rutger Bregman, a Dutch historian invited to a 2018 WEF panel on inequality, went viral when he suggested that the best way for the attendees to attack inequality was to stop avoiding taxes. Bregman described his motivation, saying "it feels like I’m at a firefighters’ conference and no one’s allowed to speak about water".

=== Formation of a detached elite ===
The formation of a detached elite, sometimes labeled with the neologism "Davos Man", refers to a global group whose members view themselves as completely "international". The term refers to people who "have little need for national loyalty, view national boundaries as obstacles, and see national governments as residues from the past whose only useful function is to facilitate the elite's global operations" according to political scientist Samuel P. Huntington, who is credited with inventing the neologism. In his 2004 article "Dead Souls: The Denationalization of the American Elite", Huntington argues that this international perspective is a minority elitist position not shared by the nationalist majority of the people.

The Transnational Institute describes the World Economic Forum's main purpose as being "to function as a socializing institution for the emerging global elite, globalization's "Mafiocracy" of bankers, industrialists, oligarchs, technocrats and politicians. They promote common ideas, and serve common interests: their own".

In 2019, the Manager Magazin journalist Henrik Müller argued that the "Davos Man" had already decayed into different groups and camps. He saw three central drivers for this development:

- Ideologically: the liberal western model was no longer considered a universal role model that other countries strive for (with China's digital totalitarianism or the traditional absolutism in the Persian Gulf as counter-proposals, all of which are represented by government members in Davos).
- Socially: societies increasingly disintegrated into different groups, each of which evoked its own identity (e.g. embodied through the Brexit vote or congressional blockades in the USA).
- Economically: the measured economic reality largely contradicted the established ideas of how the economy should actually work (despite economic upswings, wages and prices e.g. barely rose).

In 2022 the term was again used in a book by The New York Times journalist Peter S. Goodman. Titled Davos Man: How the Billionaires Devoured the World, it was described as a passionate book against global financial inequality.

=== Public cost of security ===
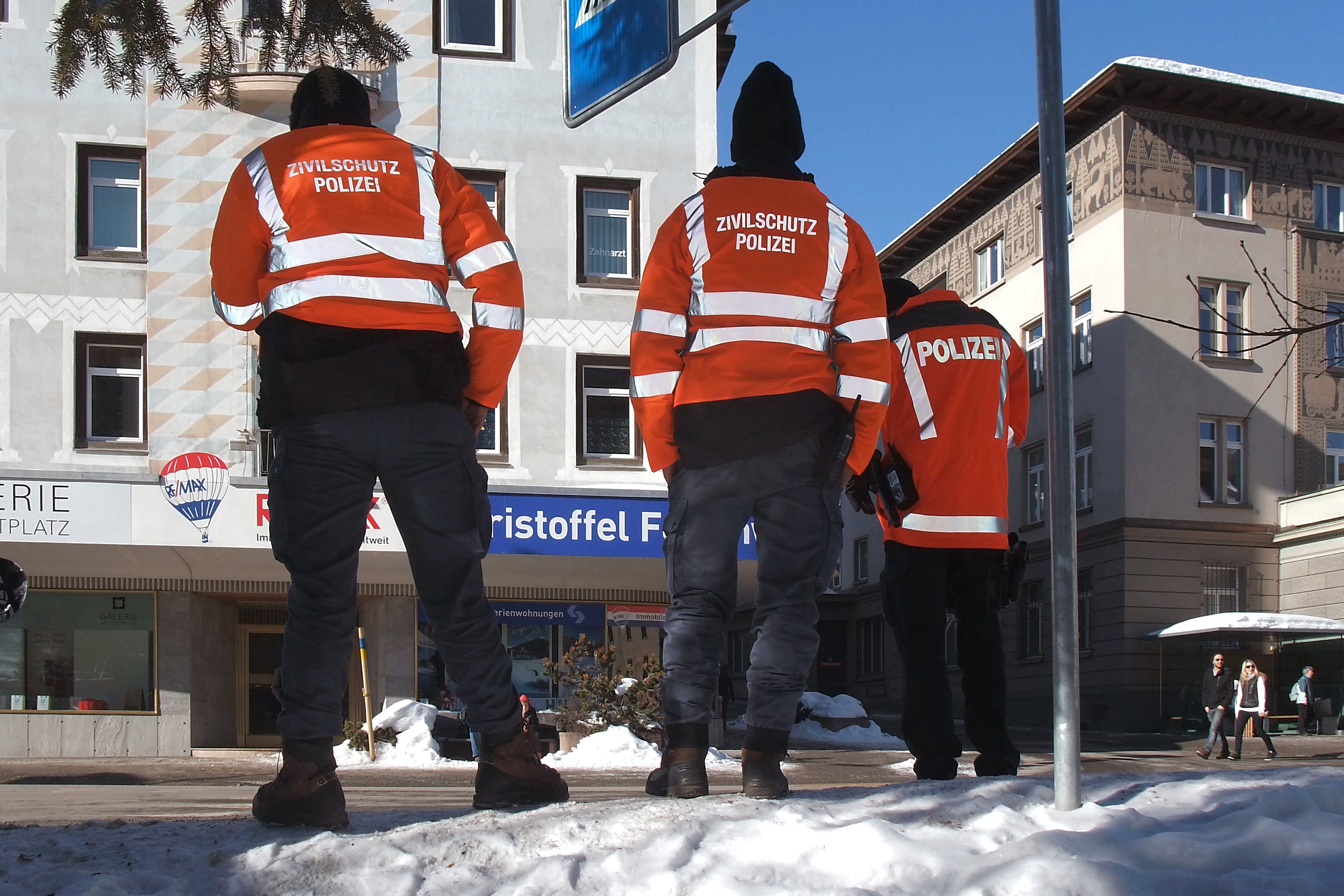
The Graubünden Civil Defense Police during the 2013 annual meeting in Davos

Critics argue that the WEF, despite having reserves of several hundred million Swiss francs and paying its executives salaries of around 1 million Swiss francs per year, would not pay any federal tax and moreover allocate a part of its costs to the public. Following massive criticism from politicians and Swiss civil society, the Swiss federal government decided in February 2021 to reduce its annual contributions to the WEF.

As of 2018, the police and military expenditures carried by the federal government stood at 39 million Swiss francs. The Aargauer Zeitung argued in January 2020 that the additional cost borne by the Kanton Graubünden stands at CHF 9 million per year.

The Swiss Green Party summarised their criticism within the Swiss National Council that the holding of the World Economic Forum has cost Swiss taxpayers hundreds of millions of Swiss francs over the past decades. In their view, it was however questionable to what extent the Swiss population or global community benefit from these expenditures.

=== Gender debate ===
Women have been broadly underrepresented at the WEF, according to some critics. The female participation rate at the WEF increased from 9% to 15% between 2001 and 2005. In 2016, 18% of the WEF attendees were female; this number increased to 21% in 2017, and 24% in 2020.

Several women have since shared their personal impressions of the Davos meetings in media articles, highlighting that issues were more profound than "a quota at Davos for female leaders or a session on diversity and inclusion". The World Economic Forum has in this context filed legal complaints against at least three investigative articles by reporters Katie Gibbons and Billy Kenber that were published by the British newspaper The Times in March 2020, with the articles still online as of January 2024.

=== Workplace discrimination ===
According to The Wall Street Journal, the WEF has had numerous accusations of workplace discrimination against women and Black people.

=== Undemocratic decision making ===
According to the European Parliament's think tank, critics see the WEF as an instrument for political and business leaders to "take decisions without having to account to their electorate or shareholders".

Since 2009, the WEF has been working on a project called the Global Redesign Initiative (GRI), which proposes a transition away from intergovernmental decision-making towards a system of multi-stakeholder governance. According to the Transnational Institute (TNI), the Forum is hence planning to replace a recognised democratic model with a model where a self-selected group of "stakeholders" make decisions on behalf of the people.

Some critics have seen the WEF's attention to goals like environmental protection and social entrepreneurship as mere window dressing to disguise its true plutocratic nature and goals. In a Guardian opinion piece, Cas Mudde said that such plutocrats should not be the group to have control over the political agendas and decide which issues to focus on and how to support them. A writer in the German magazine Cicero saw the situation as academic, cultural, media and economic elites grasping for social power while disregarding political decision processes. A materially well-endowed milieu would in this context try to "cement its dominance of opinion and sedate ordinary people with maternalistic-paternalistic social benefits, so that they are not disturbed by the common people when they steer". The French Les Echos furthermore concludes that Davos "represents the exact values people rejected at the ballot box".

=== Lack of financial transparency ===
In 2017, the former Frankfurter Allgemeine Zeitung journalist Jürgen Dunsch criticized that financial reports of the WEF were not very transparent since neither income nor expenditures were broken down. In addition, he outlined that the foundation capital was not quantified while the apparently not insignificant profits would be reinvested.

Recent annual reports published by the WEF include a more detailed breakdown of its financials and indicate revenues of CHF 349 million for the year 2019 with reserves of CHF 310 million and a foundation capital of CHF 34 million. There are no further details provided to what asset classes or individual names the WEF allocates its financial assets of CHF 261 million. From July 2019 to June 2020, the World Economic Forum has spent €250,000 on lobbying the European Union.

The German newspaper Süddeutsche Zeitung criticised in this context that the WEF had turned into a "money printing machine", which is run like a family business and forms a comfortable way to make a living for its key personnel. The foundation's founder Klaus Schwab draws a salary of around one million Swiss francs per year.

=== Unclear selection criteria ===
In a request to the Swiss National Council, the Swiss Green Party criticised that invitations to the annual meeting and programmes of the World Economic Forum are issued according to unclear criteria. They highlight that "despots" such as the son of the former Libyan dictator Saif al-Islam al-Gaddafi had been invited to the WEF and even awarded membership in the club of "Young Global Leaders". Even after the beginning of the Arab spring in December 2010 and related violent uprisings against despot regimes, the WEF continued to invite Gaddafi to its annual meeting.

=== Environmental footprint of annual meetings ===
Critics emphasise that the annual meeting of the World Economic Forum is counterproductive when combating pressing problems of humanity such as the climate crisis. Even in 2020, participants travelled to the WEF annual meeting in Davos on around 1,300 private jets while the total emissions burden from transport and accommodation were enormous in their view.

=== Corporate capture of global and democratic institutions ===
The World Economic Forum's "Global Redesign" report suggests to create "public-private" United Nations (UN) in which selected agencies operate and steer global agendas under shared governance systems.

In September 2019, more than 400 civil society organizations and 40 international networks heavily criticised a partnership agreement between WEF and the United Nations and called on the UN secretary-general to end it. They see such an agreement as a "disturbing corporate capture of the UN, which moved the world dangerously towards a privatised global governance". The Dutch Transnational Institute think tank summarises that we are increasingly entering a world where gatherings such as Davos are "a silent global coup d'état" to capture governance.

Also in September 2019, the award-winning HBO satirical comedy-drama Succession — considered one of the greatest television shows of all time — aired the episode "Argestes", which received a Rotten Tomato score of 100%. Commentators characterized the episode as social commentary against the wealth and power of the global elite at the World Economic Forum.

=== Non-accreditation of critical media outlets ===
In 2019, the Swiss newspaper WOZ received a refusal of its accreditation request for the annual meeting with the editors and subsequently accused the World Economic Forum of favoring specific media outlets. The newspaper highlighted that the WEF stated in its refusal message that it [the forum] prefers media outlets it works with throughout the year. WOZ deputy head Yves Wegelin called this a strange idea of journalism because in "journalism you don't necessarily have to work with large corporations, but rather critique them".

=== Institutional initiatives ===
In addition to economic policy, the WEF's agenda is in recent years increasingly focusing on positively connoted activist topics such as environmental protection and social entrepreneurship, which critics see as a strategy to disguise the organisation's true plutocratic goals.

In a December 2020 article by The Intercept, author Naomi Klein described that the WEF's initiatives like the "Great Reset" were simply a "coronavirus-themed rebranding" of things that the WEF was already doing and that it was an attempt by the rich to make themselves look good. In her opinion, "the Great Reset is merely the latest edition of this gilded tradition, barely distinguishable from earlier Davos Big Ideas.

Similarly, in his review of COVID-19: The Great Reset, ethicist Steven Umbrello makes parallel critiques of the agenda. He says that the WEF "whitewash[es] a seemingly optimistic future post-Great Reset with buzz words like equity and sustainability" while it functionally jeopardizes those goals.

A study published in the Journal of Consumer Research investigated the sociological impact of the WEF. It concluded that the WEF does not solve issues such as, poverty, global warming, and chronic illnesses, or debt. The forum has, according to the study, simply shifted the burden for the solution of these problems from governments and business to "responsible consumers subjects: the green consumer, the health-conscious consumer, and the financially literate consumer".

=== Appropriation of global crises ===
In December 2021, the Catholic Cardinal and former prefect of the Congregation for the Doctrine of the Faith (CDF) Gerhard Ludwig Müller criticised in a controversial interview that people like WEF founder Schwab were sitting "on the throne of their wealth" and were not touched by the everyday difficulties and sufferings people face e.g. due to the COVID-19 pandemic. On the contrary, such elites would see crises as an opportunity to push through their agendas. He particularly criticised the control such people would exercise on people and their embracement of areas such as transhumanism. The Central Council of Jews in Germany condemned this criticism, which is also linked to Jewish financial investors, as antisemitic.

On the other hand, the WEF has been criticized as "hypocritical" towards Palestinian human rights, when it rejected a petition from its own constituents to condemn Israel's aggression against Palestinians. WEF cited the need to remain "impartial" on the issue. However, Khaled Al Sabawi, writing in MondoWeiss called it hypocritical after it voluntarily condemned Russia's aggression against Ukraine months later.

=== Tampering data ===
In July 2025, the founder of World Economic Forum, Klaus Schwab, was accused of abuse of power after an internal WEF investigation found that when data for the 2017/18 WEF's Annual Competitiveness Report showed the UK had moved up the ranking from seventh to fourth place he intervened by writing to staff that the UK "must not see any improvement" as this would otherwise be "exploited by the Brexit camp". The final report published showed the UK had instead dropped by one place to eighth. In the same report India should have dropped 20 places in the ranking. However Schwab told his staff that "we must protect our relationship with India before Davos 2019", consequently the published report showed India had dropped by only one place to fortieth.

== Controversies ==
=== Whistleblower allegations and controversy with Klaus Schwab ===
In May 2025, Klaus Schwab launched a defamation and coercion complaint against anonymous whistleblowers whose allegations prompted his resignation as chair of the WEF board of trustees in 2025. The accusations, including claims of financial impropriety, research manipulation, and mishandling of sexual harassment cases, were described by Schwab as "stupid and constructed". Despite stepping down from the WEF, Schwab maintains his innocence and has stated that his lawyers filed a criminal complaint with the Geneva public prosecutor, marking a turbulent period for the World Economic Forum as an organisation. The controversy also highlighted management issues at the WEF identified in earlier investigations and reignited scrutiny over its workplace culture.

=== Davos municipality ===
In June 2021, WEF founder Klaus Schwab sharply criticised what he characterized as the "profiteering", "complacency" and "lack of commitment" by the municipality of Davos in relation to the annual meeting. He mentioned that the preparation of the COVID-related meeting in Singapore in 2021/2022 had created an alternative to its Swiss host and sees the chance that the annual meeting will stay in Davos between 40 and 70 percent.

=== Usage of "Davos" ===
As there are many other international conferences nicknamed with "Davos" such as the "Davos of the Desert" event organised by Saudi Arabia's Future Investment Initiative Institute, the World Economic Forum objected to the use of "Davos" in such contexts for any event not organised by them. This particular statement was issued on 22 October 2018, a day before the opening of 2018 Future Investment Initiative (nicknamed "Davos in the desert") organised by the Public Investment Fund of Saudi Arabia.

== Alternatives ==
=== Open Forum Davos ===
Since the annual meeting in January 2003 in Davos, an Open Forum Davos, which was co-organized by the Federation of Swiss Protestant Churches, is held concurrently with the Davos forum, opening up the debate about globalization to the general public. The Open Forum has been held in the local high school every year, featuring top politicians and business leaders. It is open to all members of the public free of charge.

=== Public Eye Awards ===
The Public Eye Awards were held every year from 2000 to 2015. It is a counter-event to the annual meeting of the World Economic Forum in Davos. Public Eye Awards is a "public competition of the worst corporations in the world." In 2011, more than 50,000 people voted for companies that acted irresponsibly. At a ceremony at a Davos hotel, the "winners" in 2011 were named as Indonesian palm oil diesel maker, Neste Oil in Finland, and mining company AngloGold Ashanti in South Africa. According to Schweiz aktuell broadcast on 16 January 2015, a public presence during the WEF 2015, may not be guaranteed because the massively increased security in Davos. The Public Eye Award will be awarded for the last time in Davos: "Public Eyes says Goodbye to Davos", confirmed by Rolf Marugg (now Landrats politician), by not directly engaged politicians, and by the police responsible.

== See also ==
- 2009 Davos incident
- Antalya Diplomacy Forum
- Asian Leadership Conference
- Boao Forum for Asia
- Bilderberg Meeting
- Boao Forum for Asia
- Davos process
- Dialog (organization)
- Eurofi
- European Business Summit
- Event 201
- Horasis
- International Transport Forum
- St. Petersburg International Economic Forum
- World Knowledge Forum
- World Social Forum
- World Youth Forum
- Allen & Company Sun Valley Conference
- Alliance for Responsible Citizenship
- St. Gallen Symposium
- World Governments Summit
