= Population Foundation of India =

Non-profit organisation

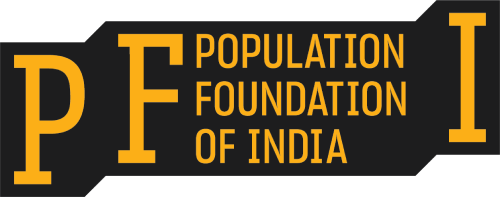
- Founded: 1970
- Founder: JRD Tata and Dr. Bharat Ram
- Type: Non-governmental organization
- Purpose: Family Planning, Adolescent Health
- Location(s): HO - New Delhi, India; Branches - Jaipur, Lucknow, Patna
- Website: populationfoundation.in

Population Foundation of India is a national non-profit organisation (NGO), which promotes and advocates for the effective formulation and implementation of gender sensitive population, health and development strategies and policies.

== History ==
The organisation was founded in 1970 by a group of industrialists under the leadership of the late JRD Tata and Dr Bharat Ram.
