= Social entrepreneurship in South Asia =

Social entrepreneurship in South Asia involves business activities that have a social benefit, often for people at the bottom of the pyramid. It is an emerging area of entrepreneurship that is supported by both the public sector and the private sector.

Social entrepreneurship is capable of empowering groups that don't typically participate in the entrepreneurial market. In South Asia, women entrepreneurs lead 20% of social enterprises. Women-led businesses provide economic empowerment especially in cultural contexts where women are not the main breadwinners. India, Pakistan, and Bangladesh all of which have seen a rise in social businesses in the last few decades.

== History ==
The most successful social entrepreneurial ventures in South Asia have historically worked on initiatives that alleviate poverty, focusing on increasing access to capital. These initiatives have been led by both governments and private enterprises.

In 1969, the Indian government nationalized its banks, and began a campaign to expand bank access across the country. Between 1969 and 1990, the program created 30,000 banks in rural locations that were previously unbanked. While successful in addressing rural poverty with extremely high returns to capital, which is well-expected in low-income countries, urban poor left out entirely. The keep this program going, the Indian government invested significant capital, but during the program's tenure there was no measurement of program effectiveness, which remained an issue to be addressed.

One of the most well-known social entrepreneurs from South Asia, Muhammad Yunus, is a native of Bangladesh, and Ranjan Mistry from India. Yunus founded the Grameen Bank in 1976 with the mindset that lending money to poor people could build the credit they need to work their way out of poverty while being profitable. For his work in microcredit, Yunus was awarded the Nobel Peace Prize for "efforts to create economic and social development from below". Due to the Grameen Bank's success, it has inspired a multitude of individuals to also seek out ways to improve human wellbeing through business, especially young entrepreneurs.

Social entrepreneurship is still a nascent field in South Asia, as most of the ventures have only been created in the past five to six years.

== Types of Social Entrepreneurship ==
Social entrepreneurship in South Asia is often focused on building capabilities. Yujuico emphasizes that social entrepreneurship works to create interventions that mobilize capital to aid those who are disadvantaged. Through social entrepreneurship, Shahrazad Hadad states that individuals often seek the following five aims: conceive new markets for social necessities, establish new jobs and social equity, mobilize resources for social good, conceive social capital, and aid beneficiaries and customers.

Social entrepreneurs can pursue these aims and generate social impact through social enterprises and impact investing.

=== Social enterprises ===
Social enterprises are business entities that are either public or private that address social issues related to education, health, and access to capital. Alvord, Brown, and Letts emphasize that social entrepreneurship manifests itself in three main ways: combining commercial enterprises with social impact, innovating strictly for social impact without attention paid to profit, and catalyzing social transformation beyond the initial problem. Currently, numbers of social enterprises include 448,000 in Pakistan, 150,000 in Bangladesh, and 2,000,000 in India.

=== Impact investing ===
Impact investing currently serves target their investments in South Asia in two main ways: intention of enterprise to create impact and potential to do so. Impact investing often addresses enterprises that are currently on a small-scale, instead of large infrastructure projects addressed by other forms of aid. Current impact investments in South Asia are growingly interested in agro-business, health, information technology, and bottom of the pyramid initiatives. There are currently 50 country-specific impact funds in India, 7 in Pakistan, and 9 in Bangladesh that have deployed a total of 720.4 million US dollars' worth of capital in South Asia.

Impact investing can operate at several stages in the businesses' development: seed funding, early stage funding, and growth stage funding.

== Demographics ==
=== Social entrepreneurs ===
People become interested in social entrepreneurship often because they wish to address problems that both governments and markets have failed. In analyzing the reasons why certain regions and countries engage in social entrepreneurship, Johanna Mair found that it often highly depends on the region. In South Asia, she states, social entrepreneurship is shaped by the political problems that these countries have faced since their independence from Britain. Most countries are currently undergoing rapid development, with a significant gap widening between rich and poor individuals. So, there has been a rise in people-centered development, which encourages citizens to be active in addressing issues in their communities. In India, social entrepreneurs often focus on social inequality, as formal legislation does not recognize discrimination although the caste system is quite prominent. People of low-castes are often the base of the bottom of the pyramid. In Bangladesh, social businesses like the Grameen Bank and Building Resources Across Communities (BRAC) address issues related to government inefficiencies, which often ignore rural poor. In Pakistan, natural disasters like earthquakes have also led to the creation of organizations that operate where relief efforts lack.

Some key groups engaged in social entrepreneurship include women and young people.

==== Women ====
Women represent a growing sector of social entrepreneurs. Gailey and Bhatt Datta write that women are often driven to entrepreneurship in order to feel empowered in their own circumstances because they want:

"(1) Access to resources, including preconditions;

(2) agency, including process; and

(3) achievements, including outcomes."

In most countries, women become entrepreneurs more in the informal economy than the formal economy. In fact, the informal sector is often the primary source of employment for women in developing countries Relatively few of these women employ paid workers, and often act as traders and producers. This leads to smaller-scale operations, but self-employed women often make more money than they would if they were a wage worker or a subcontracted worker.

==== Young people ====
The majority of social entrepreneurs are under the age of 35. Despite high levels of representation, their reasons for engagement in social entrepreneurship has been under-explored especially in developing countries.

=== Target populations ===
Social entrepreneurs in South Asia often address needs of those at the bottom of the pyramid. Poor people often aren't able to meet their basic needs, like education and health, because for three reasons: access, quality, and affordability. When targeting the poor, affordability is critical often because the poorest people have extremely low levels of capital. 469 million people in India currently earn less than $1.25 a day while 850 million people earn less than $2 a day. While they don't have high purchasing power individually, collectively they represent an aggregated purchasing power of $1 trillion. Research has even been done to show poor people can mobilize capital to purchase goods only if they are made at a price point that is affordable to them.

The vast majority of social enterprises benefit the local community, at 90% in Bangladesh and 80% in Pakistan. Only a minority work with large numbers of beneficiaries, with 2% of enterprises in India having helped a total of 60 million people. The largest beneficiary groups are women and youth.

== Policy ==
=== Legal forms for social enterprises ===
There is not one designation across countries in South Asia for social enterprises. In India, the two most common legal statuses for social businesses are private limited companies and non-governmental organizations (NGOs). In Bangladesh, sole proprietorship is the most common form of registration, often because it is the easiest type of business structure to start up especially for those with limited resources. Other common forms of legal structures include partnerships and societies. In Pakistan, social businesses can be structured as either for-profits or non-profits, and are most commonly structured as for profit organizations. Still, 1 in 4 social enterprises in Pakistan have no registered legal status.

=== Government support ===
Recently, countries have begun to grow organizations that support entrepreneurial efforts. For Startup India, an initiative of the Government of India, is working to empower startups working in innovation and design and promote businesses to stay in India to do their work. Still these initiatives remain too broad to support social entrepreneurs, whose models often don't fit into traditional systems.

Laws are starting to be initiated that provide policy guidelines social innovation but they are being introduced unequally across South Asia. India, for instance, recently included social innovation in its 2015 National Skill and Entrepreneurship Policy. In their policy they outlined several actions for bolstering social enterprises including creating 'Social Entrepreneurship' courses in academic institutions, offering fiscal incentives for impact investing, helping grass-roots innovation commercialize, and creating social impact incubators. Both Pakistan and Bangladesh have no such explicit policy on social enterprises.

=== Corporate social responsibility ===
Corporate social responsibility (CSR) is becoming far more important in the growth of social entrepreneurship, and has a great impact on the impact of social innovation. Companies often have the finances available to support local efforts and invest in the research needed to understand the need of the rural poor. The Companies Act, 2013 in India requires companies that have a network of INR 500 crore, turnover of INR 1,000 crore, or a net profit of INR 5 crore to commit 2% of average net profits to pursue CSR policy. It is the only country in the world to do so.

Eligible CSR activities include:

- Reducing child mortality
- Environmental sustainability
- Eradicating hunger
- Promotion of education
- Gender equity
- Disaster relief.

Companies can pursue CSR through the following four methods:

1. Directly as the company
2. Through a company's non-profit foundation
3. Through a registered non-profit organization
4. Collaborating with other companies.

== Capacity Building ==
=== Education and training ===
Ashoka: Innovators for the Public is one of the world's leading social impact training agencies, and was one of the first to begin investments in India. William Drayton, Ashoka's founder, inspiration for his organization came from Ashoka the Great, a Maurya Emperor from the 3rd Century B.C.who left behind pillars known as the edicts of Ashoka which detailed much of his benevolent work on social good and welfare. In these writing, he discusses a series of social programs that he implemented in order to ensure the wellbeing of his citizens, including bringing in essential medicines for his people and creating roadside facilities for travelers. Ashoka's model is to first find those people are addressing big problems, then supply them with the funding and services they need to be successful. They focus on small investment and support in order to produce maximum gains to support visions. Ashoka's Fellows Program has led the way for many entrepreneurs to launch companies in India. Ranjan Mistry, Indian Social Entrepreneur established Women School of Entrepreneurship for fueling entrepreneurial spirit, and supporting last miles girls and women in India.

India has several social enterprise incubators, including UnLtd India and Villgro, which focus on seed-stage and early stage social entrepreneurs. There are only a handful of accelerators that provide workshops and mentorship in addition to funding, and those include the Impact Investment Holding, the Centre for Innovation Incubation and Entrepreneurship, Ahmedabad, and Dasra's Social Impact Accelerator Programme. The Jindal Centre for Social Innovation & Entrepreneurship, an initiative of O. P. Jindal Global University, has created a series of Massive Open Online Courses (MOOCs) on social entrepreneurship in partnership with FutureLearn, Europe’s leading online social learning platform. The Social Innovation Lab, founded in 2013, runs similar trainings and mentorship for social innovators in Lahore, Pakistan. YY Goshti in Dhaka, Bangladesh, is one of the leading early stage social incubators in Bangladesh just founded in 2016, that has already supported 23 social businesses.

People have also worked to reduce barriers to female engagement in social entrepreneurship through implementing focused, women-only trainings. Women entrepreneurs often fail because there are not adequate training or advisory services. With women-only trainings, women can not only gain the skills they need to start their companies but also build a community that inspires them to keep working.

Young people are often the largest target population for social entrepreneurship education. Ashoka India piloted the Youth Initiative, which aims to help Indian youth across the country to take on leadership roles in the civic sphere and realize social change. They tackle two critical problems related to getting youth engaged in entrepreneurship: (1) young people are systematically undervalued and (2) young people need transformative experiences at young ages to empower them. Higher education is also seeking to service young people looking to engage in entrepreneurship. In Pakistan, the Higher Education Medium Term Development Framework II emphasizes the importance of teaching entrepreneurship to all University-age students. Pakistan also has a Youth Venture Capital Fund solely for supporting young entrepreneurs.

=== Resources and support systems ===
In Pakistan, the government had led the creation of the Center for Entrepreneurship through the Ministry for Planning, Development, and Reform in 2015, to support young entrepreneurs working to address the Sustainable Development Goals. This organization focuses solely on students and young entrepreneurs and hosts networking events, brainstorming sessions, seminars, and pitch events. In India, the National Entrepreneurship Network supports student entrepreneurship in universities across the country.

Co-working spaces also provides space for entrepreneurs to work and collaborate with each other. While there are few strictly social-focused co-working spaces, most are open to social entrepreneurs. In India, several spaces include Bombay Connect, Jaaga, Springboard Ventures, and Alpha Lab.

For female social entrepreneurs, female-only cooperatives are often critical. Many have been formed in South Asia in recent years. Some of the most successful include the Self-Employed Women's Association, the Cooperative Development Foundation, and Lijjat. Lijjat has been intensively studied for its work to provide self-employment opportunities for poor, urban women. This organization receives little governmental support, but is still able to have high profit margins and provides ownership opportunities to women involved in the program through profit sharing. Such initiatives have helped women to earn profit in a way that is empowering and culturally sensitive. As one woman from Lijjat is quoted "I realized that from working here [Lijjat], I could earn an income to support my family. Also, since I would be working from home and with other women, my husband would not raise any objections".

== Challenges ==
=== Limited knowledge ===
Much of the discussion of social entrepreneurship and innovation has been from a Western lens, with only recent research focusing on other locales like South Asia. So, understanding of what works and doesn't work in South Asia is only beginning to be understood.

Social entrepreneurship at its core is more difficult than traditional entrepreneurship as social entrepreneurs must find where markets or institutions have failed. This is significant as many South Asian countries lack strong democracies, and low government transparency often means that governments lack the capability to address social problems. A social entrepreneur's motivations must also be beyond just making a profit.

=== Funding limitations ===
For many social entrepreneurs in South Asia, access to capital and maintaining that capital is the major barrier to growth.

Engagement in social entrepreneurship is also highly impacted by social status. Hindu entrepreneurs are typically classified by caste, with higher castes being more likely to engage in entrepreneurship than lower castes. Almost 65% of entrepreneurs were from high castes while no people from the lowest castes were entrepreneurs. This is because people from higher castes are more likely to have the resources to support their ventures.

=== Limitations by gender ===
Gender can also greatly restrict active participation in entrepreneurship. In both Bangladesh and Pakistan, social and cultural barriers limit women from starting their own ventures as this is an activity that is not regarded positive for women to participate in. Rural women in South Asia often begin their businesses small, meaning that they need access to small funds in order to bolster their businesses. While the informal economy is an important employer of women, women participating in the informal economy often receive far less recognition than their male counterparts even if they are working for social change. Female entrepreneurs in South Asia also choose not to grow their businesses because they often choose to support their families. Technology has also been incredibly important for driving social change, but women are more likely to not have access to vital technology. For example, women are 38% less likely to own a mobile phone than men. This is especially limiting as many upcoming social innovations in India utilize information and communication technology.

=== Policy limitations ===
Currently, social enterprises in many countries in South Asia are categorized as NGOs, but this definition does not recognize businesses that have a social mission but make profit. This can often limit social enterprises as there are strict definitions of NGOs in India, specifically related to the movement of capital. If any money is received it is treated as a 'donation' and so cannot be used to make returns which makes investing limited and stalls social enterprise growth. These limitations have led many social entrepreneurs to pursue a private limited structure. For example, many microcredit enterprises have transitioned from non-profits to for-profit in order to pursue profit generation. This lack of legal structure in addition to equity investment regulations, restrictions on blended capital, and restrictive laws on foreign capital through acts like the Foreign Contribution Regulation Act, restrict the actions of social entrepreneurs.

== Examples of Social Entrepreneurship ==
=== India ===
Gloria de Souza, the first Ashoka Fellow ever, introduced experiential and problem-solving education in the classroom. Her work now impacts 10 million children and the Indian government has adopted it into their schools.

Society for Research and Initiatives for Sustainable Technologies and Institutions (SRISTI) is an organization that focuses on spurring innovation at the community level. Their main program is the Honey Bee Network, which it has run for 26 years. Through this program, they focus on mobilizing: educational innovations by school and college teachers, students and other stakeholders, institutional innovations at community level for managing resources, access of knowledge for poor people can develop and become self-reliant, and cultural creativity.

Piramal Water is working to address the issue of clean drinking water in India, as currently 25 million people lack access to clean water. This leads to 1600 deaths daily and $5.4 million in losses. They address water quality issues at the level of an individual to a school to even a slum. A modern social enterprise, Piramal serves 5,000,000 people daily through 800 purification units and 400 water ATMs, all while generating 4 million dollars for the economy annually.

=== Pakistan ===
The Hashoo Foundation is a leading social impact agency working to support Afghan refugees through skills training and income generation. The organization seeks to build the vocational skills that refugees need to be successful in their new lives. Their work also focuses on supporting women economically in order to improve their opportunities in a male dominated labor market.

A more profit-focused social business, Ghonsla seeks to provide insulation made of recycled materials that is economical and sustainable to underserved markets. This helps communities who are affected by cold winters, which is nearly 1 million households. Families often have to burn wood in order to keep the home heated during the winter, which is a costly expense and a health risk. Ghonsla's finishes reduce energy bills and allow rooms to heat 50% faster.

=== Bangladesh ===
In addition to the Grameen Bank, Building Resources Across Communities (BRAC) is a leading organization in Bangladesh that was founded in 1972 that works to create village groups that can solve local problems and focus on village development. Instead of just providing relief like international development agencies, BRAC focuses on building capabilities. The organization focuses on learning from the individuals they work with in order to benefit the organization as a whole. They currently lead a series of business that address various aspects of livelihood. These businesses include BRAC Sanitary Napkin and Delivery Skit, which aids women in accessing menstrual products and medical kits for safe births, BRAC Salt, which ensures a supply of iodized salt to address iodine deficiencies, BRAC Nursery, which sells seedlings and potted plants to increase tree plantation, and Aarong, which harness 65,000 artisans in rural Bangladesh to create products for retail sale.

JITA Bangladesh is another leading social business that trains bottom of the pyramid rural women as distributors or products and services in untapped markets. Women earn commissions by selling products door-to-door. They are also starting to create Bottola Centers, or women-managed businesses where they create products for their communities. They've currently trained nearly 3000 women and engaged 11 million consumers in 250 hubs.

bKash, founded by Kamal Quadir, provides a mobile platform for financial transactions, and currently has 30 million registered users. It is the largest mobile money company in the world. Through an app, users are able to make business transactions, send money to family, and receive aid. Individuals can also use their phones to do cash transfer at different retail outlets, eliminating a need for cost-heavy banking infrastructure. Kamal was recognized with the 2015 MENA Social Entrepreneur of the Year Award from the Schwab Foundation and the 2018 Best Financial Innovation Award from the Bangladesh Innovation Awards for his work.

== See also ==
- Social Innovation
- Social Entrepreneurship
- Social Enterprise
- Microcredit
