= Social entrepreneurship =

Approach to develop, fund and implement solutions to social or environmental issues

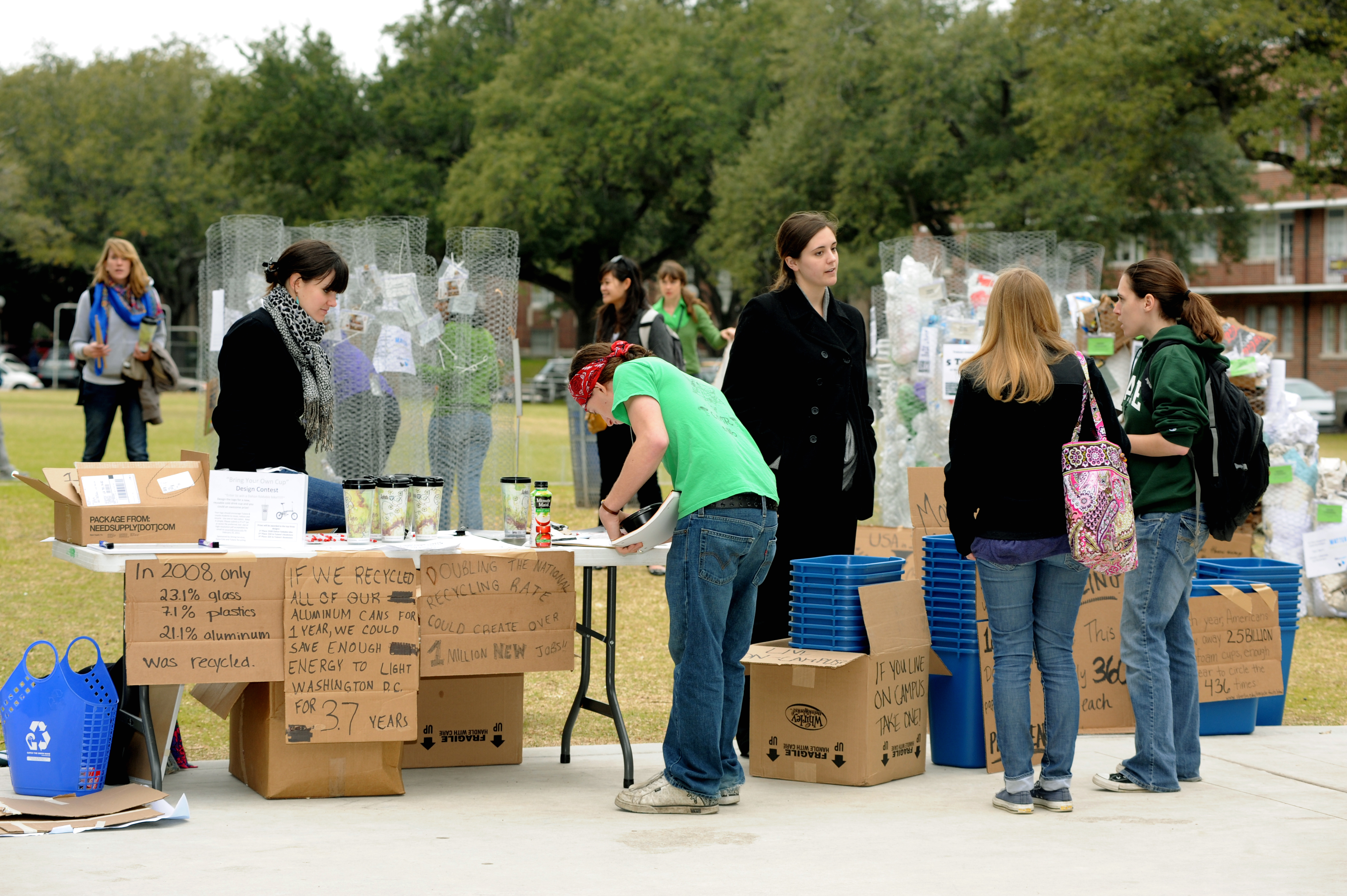
Student organizers from the Green Club at Newcomb College Institute formed a social entrepreneurship organization in 2010 that aimed to encourage people to reduce waste and live in a more environmentally conscious way.

Social entrepreneurship is an approach by individuals, groups, start-up companies or entrepreneurs, in which they develop, fund and implement solutions to social, cultural, or environmental issues. This concept may be applied to a wide range of organizations, which vary in size, aims, and beliefs. For-profit entrepreneurs typically measure performance using business metrics like profit, revenues and increases in stock prices. Social entrepreneurs, however, are either non-profits, or they blend for-profit goals with generating a positive "return to society". Therefore, they use different metrics. Social entrepreneurship typically attempts to further broad social, cultural and environmental goals often associated with the voluntary sector in areas such as poverty alleviation, health care and community development.

At times, profit-making social enterprises may be established to support the social or cultural goals of the organization but not as an end in themselves. For example, an organization that aims to provide housing and employment to the homeless may operate a restaurant, both to raise money and to provide employment for the homeless.

In 2010, social entrepreneurship was facilitated by the use of the Internet, particularly social networking and social media websites. These websites enable social entrepreneurs to reach numerous people who are not geographically close yet who share the same goals and encourage them to collaborate online, learn about the issues, disseminate information about the group's events and activities, and raise funds through crowdfunding.

In recent years, researchers have been calling for a better understanding of the ecosystem in which social entrepreneurship exists and social ventures operate. This will help them formulate better strategy and help achieve their double bottom line objective.

== Modern definition ==
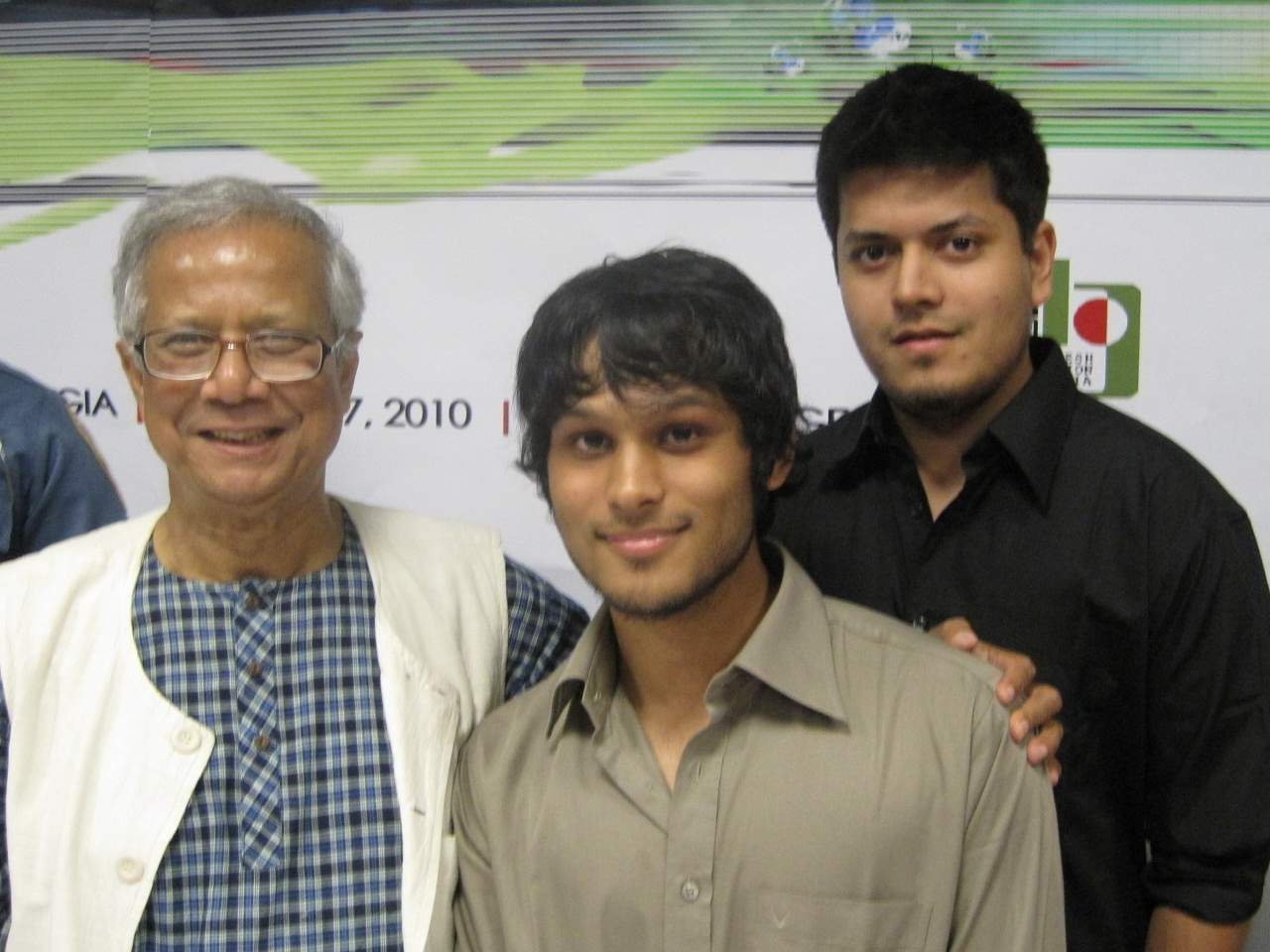
Grameen Bank founder and Nobel Peace Prize winner Muhammad Yunus (left) with two young social entrepreneurs (right).

The concept and terminology of social entrepreneurship emerged in the 1960s and since then has been gaining more momentum. Despite this, after decades of efforts to find a common ground to define the concept, no consensus has been reached. The dynamic nature of the object and the multiplicity of the conceptual lenses used by researchers has made it impossible to capture it, to such an extent that scholars have compared it with a mythological beast. The difficulties in defining social entrepreneurship also stems from the fact that the concept is value-laden and that different definitions may reflect different political views on what type of entrepreneurship could be beneficial to society.

Scholars have different backgrounds, generating a great disparity of conceptualizations. These should be arranged in five clusters of meaning, according to the focus given and the conceptual framework assumed by the researcher. The first group of authors focuses on the person of the entrepreneur, being the mainstream definition. J. G. Dees argues that social entrepreneurship is the result and the creation of an especially creative and innovative leader.

Social entrepreneurs can include a range of career types and professional backgrounds, ranging from social work and community development to entrepreneurship and environmental science. For this reason, it is difficult to determine who is a social entrepreneur. David Bornstein has even used the term "social innovator" interchangeably with social entrepreneur, due to the creative, non-traditional strategies that many social entrepreneurs use. For a clearer definition of what social entrepreneurship entails, it is necessary to set the function of social entrepreneurship apart from other voluntary sector and charity-oriented activities and identify the boundaries within which social entrepreneurs operate. Some scholars have advocated restricting the term to founders of organizations that primarily rely on earned income (meaning income earned directly from paying consumers), rather than income from donations or grants. Others have extended this to include contracted work for public authorities, while still others include grants and donations.

Social entrepreneurship in modern society offers an altruistic form of entrepreneurship that focuses on the benefits that society may reap. Entrepreneurship becomes a social endeavor when it transforms social capital in a way that affects society positively. If a person's behaviour or motives are altruistic, they show concern for the happiness and welfare of other people rather than for themselves.

Social entrepreneurship is viewed as advantageous because the success of social entrepreneurship depends on many factors related to social impact that traditional corporate businesses do not prioritize. Social entrepreneurs recognize immediate social problems, but also seek feedback from diverse communities and attempt to understand the broader context of an issue that crosses disciplines, fields, and theories. Gaining a larger understanding of how an issue relates to society allows social entrepreneurs to develop innovative solutions and mobilize available resources to affect the greater global society. Unlike traditional corporate businesses, social entrepreneurship ventures focus on maximizing gains in social satisfaction, rather than maximizing profit gains. Both private and public agencies worldwide have had billion-dollar initiatives to empower deprived communities and individuals. Such support from organizations in society, such as government-aid agencies or private firms, may catalyze innovative ideas to reach a larger audience.

Prominent individuals associated with social entrepreneurship include Pakistani Akhter Hameed Khan and Bangladeshi Muhammad Yunus, a leader of social entrepreneurship in South Asia. Yunus was the founder of Grameen Bank, which pioneered the concept of microcredit for supporting innovators in multiple developing countries in Asia, Africa, and Latin America. He received a Nobel Peace Prize for his efforts. Others, such as former Indianapolis mayor Stephen Goldsmith, addressed social efforts on a local level by using the private sector to provide city services.

== Characteristics ==
Bill Drayton founded Ashoka in 1980, an organization which supports local social entrepreneurs. Drayton tells his employees to look for four qualities: creativity, entrepreneurial quality, social impact of the idea, and ethical fiber. Creativity has two parts: goal-setting and problem-solving. Social entrepreneurs are creative enough to have a vision of what they want to happen and how to make that vision happen. In their book The Power of Unreasonable People, John Elkington and Pamela Hartigan identify why social entrepreneurs are, as they put it, unreasonable. They argue that these men and women seek profit in social output where others would not expect profit. They also ignore evidence suggesting that their enterprises will fail and attempt to measure results which no one is equipped to measure. About this, the Schwab Foundation says that entrepreneurs have "A zeal to measure and monitor their impact. Entrepreneurs have high standards, particularly in relation to their own organization's efforts and in response to the communities with which they engage. Data, both quantitative and qualitative, are their key tools, guiding continuous feedback and improvement." Ashoka operates in multiple countries.

Entrepreneurial quality builds from creativity. Not only do entrepreneurs have an idea that they must implement, they know how to implement it and are realistic in the vision of implementing it. Drayton says that, "Entrepreneurs have in their heads the vision of how society will be different when their idea is at work, and they can't stop until that idea is not only at work in one place, but is at work across the whole society." This manifests through a clear idea of what they believe the future will look like and a drive to make this come true. Besides this, entrepreneurs are not happy with the status quo: they want healthy change. This changemaking process has been described as the creation of market disequilibria through the conversion of antagonistic assets into complementarities.

Social impact measures whether the idea itself will be able to cause change after the original founder is gone. If an idea has intrinsic worth, once implemented it will cause change even without the charismatic leadership of the first entrepreneur. One reason that these entrepreneurs are unreasonable is that they are unqualified for the task they take on. Most entrepreneurs have not studied the skills needed to implement their ideas. Instead, they bring a team of qualified people around themselves. It is the idea that draws this team.

Ethical fiber is important because leaders who are about to change the world must be trustworthy. Drayton described this to his employees by suggesting that they picture a situation that frightens them and then place the candidate in the situation with them. If they feel comfortable in this scenario, the entrepreneur has ethical fiber. One distinguishing attribute of entrepreneurs is that they rarely take credit for making change. They insist that the change they have brought about is due to everyone around them. They also tend to be driven by emotion; they are not trying primarily to make a profit but to address suffering. Muhammad Yunus says about this characteristic, "He (or she) competes in the marketplace with all other competitors but is inspired by a set of social objectives. This is the basic reason for being in the business."

== Challenges ==
Because the world of social entrepreneurship is relatively new, existing now for over a few decades, there are challenges facing those who delve into the field. First, social entrepreneurs are trying to predict, address and creatively respond to future problems and often face difficulties in identifying the right problems to solve. Unlike most business entrepreneurs, who address current market deficiencies, social entrepreneurs tackle hypothetical, unseen or often less-researched issues, such as overpopulation, unsustainable energy sources, food shortages. Founding successful social businesses on merely potential solutions can be nearly impossible as investors are much less willing to support risky ventures. If entrepreneurs are able to receive funding from investors, the challenges do not stop with balancing both the social and business aspects of the business.

The lack of investors, who invest in social and environmental positive impact, leads to the second problem in social entrepreneurship: the pay gap. Elkington and Hartigan note that "the salary gap between commercial and social enterprises… remains the elephant in the room, curtailing the capacity of [social enterprises] to achieve long-term success and viability." Social entrepreneurs and their employees are more often receiving lower salaries, especially at the onset of their ventures. Thus, their enterprises at times can struggle to maintain qualified, committed employees. Though social entrepreneurs are tackling the world's most pressing issues, they must also confront skepticism and stinginess from the very society they seek to serve.

Another reason social entrepreneurs are often unsuccessful is because they typically offer help for those least able to pay for it. Capitalism is founded upon the exchange of capital (most obviously, money) for goods and services. However, social entrepreneurs must find new business models that do not rely on standard exchange of capital in order to make their organizations sustainable. This self-sustainability is what distinguishes social businesses from charities, who rely almost entirely on donations and outside funding.

Acumen, a nonprofit global venture capital fund, detailed reasons why some of their impact investments into social enterprises failed in a report named Failing Forward. Themes include customer inability to pay for goods and services, governance challenges and issues related to working within broken or ineffective value chains.

== History ==
Social entrepreneurship is distinct from the concept of entrepreneurship, yet still shares several similarities with its business cousin. Jean-Baptiste Say (1767–1832), a French economist, defined an entrepreneur as a person who "undertakes" an idea and shifts perspectives in a way that it alters the effect that an idea has on society. An entrepreneur is further defined by Say as someone who "shifts economic resources out of an area of lower and into an area of higher productivity and greater yield." The difference between "entrepreneurship" and "social entrepreneurship", however, stems from the purpose of a creation. Social entrepreneurs seek to transform societies at large, rather than transforming their profit margin, as classic entrepreneurs typically seek to do. Social entrepreneurs use a variety of resources to bring societies into a better state of well-being.

The concept of "social entrepreneurship" is not a novel idea, but in the 2000s, it has become more popular among society and academic research, notably after the publication of "The Rise of the Social Entrepreneur" by Charles Leadbeater. Many activities related to community development and higher social purpose fall within the modern definition of social entrepreneurship. Despite the established definition nowadays, social entrepreneurship remains a difficult concept to define, since it may be manifested in multiple forms. A broad definition of the concept allows interdisciplinary research efforts to understand and challenge the notions behind social entrepreneurship. No matter in which sector of society certain organizations are (i.e. corporations or unincorporated associations, societies, associations or cooperatives), social entrepreneurship focuses on the social impact that an endeavor aims at. Whether social entrepreneurship is altruistic or not is less important than the effect it has on society.

The terms social entrepreneur and social entrepreneurship were used first in the literature in 1953 by H. Bowen in his book Social Responsibilities of the Businessman. The terms came into widespread use in the 1980s and 1990s, promoted by Bill Drayton, Charles Leadbeater, and others. From the 1950s to the 1990s, the politician Michael Young was a leading promoter of social entrepreneurship and in the 1980s, he was described by Professor Daniel Bell at Harvard University as the "world's most successful entrepreneur of social enterprises". Young created more than sixty new organizations worldwide, including the School for Social Entrepreneurs (SSE) which exists in the UK, Australia, and Canada and which supports individuals to realize their potential and to establish, scale, and sustain, social enterprises and social businesses. Another notable British social entrepreneur is Andrew Mawson OBE, who was given a peerage in 2007 because of his urban regeneration work including the Bromley by Bow Centre in East London. Although the terms are relatively new, social entrepreneurs and social entrepreneurship may be found throughout history. A list of a few noteworthy people whose work exemplifies the modern definition of "social entrepreneurship" includes Florence Nightingale, founder of the first nursing school and developer of modern nursing practices; Robert Owen, founder of the cooperative movement; and Vinoba Bhave, founder of India's Land Gift Movement. Jacqueline Novogratz, Founder and CEO of Acumen, is a social impact leader transforming lives globally through Patient Capital and moral leadership and has contributed specifically towards the advancement of social enterprise to tackle problems of poverty in the Global South. During the nineteenth and twentieth centuries some of the most successful social entrepreneurs straddled the civic, governmental and business worlds. These pioneers promoted new ideas that were taken up by mainstream public services in welfare, schools and health care.

== Ecosystem ==
The ecosystem framework can be very useful for social entrepreneurs in formulating their strategy. The need for understanding the ecosystem of social enterprises has been increasingly supported as researchers emphasize on the importance of contextual factors supporting and constraining social ventures. Researchers note that there is a need to understand the ecosystems of social enterprises, as they often operate in a context which is highly localized, interacting with small, local actors, but may also be intimately connected to other systems operating at a broader (regional, country level or even global) level which influence their immediate environment.

Many researchers such as P. N. Bloom and J. G. Dees attempted to develop an ecosystem model for social entrepreneurs. The ecosystem model proposed by them comprises all the actors operating in the ecosystem, as well as the larger environment the laws, policies, social norms, demographic trends, and cultural institutions within which the actors play. Similarly, Dees et al. (2008) developed a framework to describe the key elements of the social entrepreneurship ecosystem in which they organized the elements into two broad categories – capital infrastructure and context-setting factors.

More recently in 2020, Debapratim Purkayastha, T. Tripathy and B. Das extended the business ecosystem literature to the social policy and social entrepreneurship arena. They developed a comprehensive ecosystem model in the context of the Indian microfinance sector that can be also used by other social enterprises as a framework to understand their own ecosystem and formulate their strategy. The researchers define the ecosystem as consisting of "the complex and evolving network of the focal organization (social enterprise) and all other individuals and organizations that the focal organization interact with including competitors, suppliers, complementors, customers, beneficiaries, regulators, resource providers, etc. that directly or indirectly influence each other; their interactions, as also the immediate and the broader environment (economic, social, political, etc.) the organization is influenced by and reside in". The model helps identify all the actors in the complex ecosystem, the capital infrastructure and the context-setting factors.

== 2000s ==
=== Major organizations ===
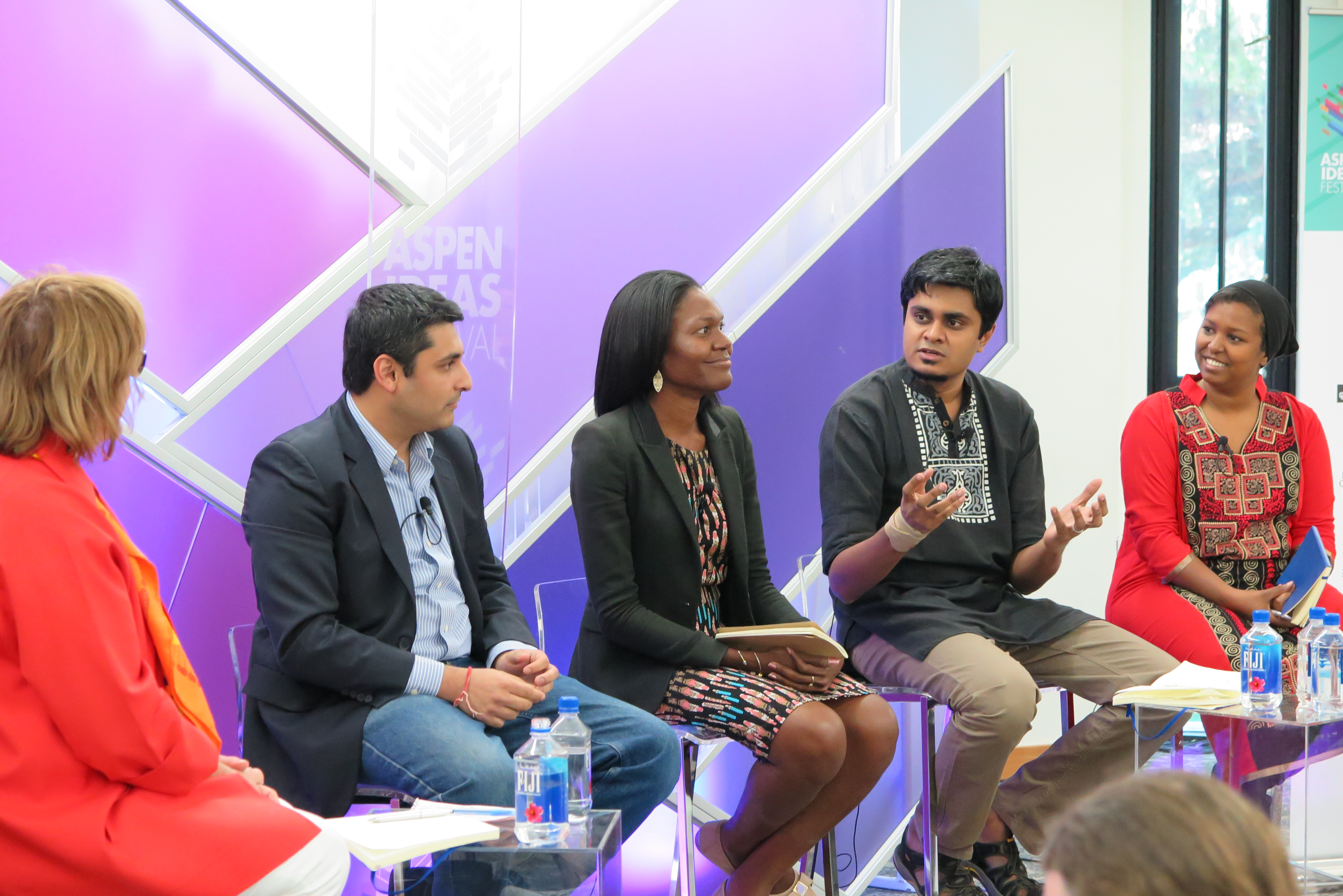
A panel discusses social entrepreneurship in the health care sector in 2015.

The ecosystem of social enterprise support is strong in several countries. Social enterprise support organizations sometimes operate globally but there are also local providers that are dedicated to helping individuals start and grow social enterprises in specific countries or regions. These organizations typically offer a mix of training, funding and community and include Acumen, Echoing Green, School for Social Entrepreneurs and Ashoka.

Groups focused on social entrepreneurship may be divided into several categories: community-based enterprises, socially responsible enterprises, social services industry professionals, and socio-economic enterprises. Community-based enterprises are based on the social ventures aimed at and involving an entire community. These enterprises build on the community's culture and capital (e.g., volunteer resources, financing, in-kind donations, etc.) to empower the enterprise and the community. Socially responsible enterprises focus on creating sustainable development through their inside organization acts that focus mostly on creating societal gains for the community. Social service industry professionals such as social workers and public health nurses work in social services, either for a government or a non-profit organization. They aim to expand social capital for individuals, communities, and organizations. Socio-economic enterprises include corporations that balance earning profits with nonprofit goals, such as seeking social change for communities. Some social entrepreneurship organizations are not enterprises in a business sense; instead, they may be charities, non-profit organizations or voluntary sector organizations.

In addition, there are support organizations dedicated to empowering social entrepreneurs, connecting them with mentors, strengthening their enterprise models, and preparing them for capital investments. These incubators and accelerator organizations provide office and meeting space (often free), mentoring and coaching for social enterprise founders and leaders to help them develop their enterprises by improving the effectiveness of their business model, marketing, and strategy. Some accelerator organizations help social entrepreneur leaders to scale up their organization, either by taking it from a local scale to a national scale or from a national scale to a global scale. Some entrepreneurship support organizations also provide mentoring and coaching to social entrepreneurs.

One well-known social entrepreneur from South Asia is Muhammad Yunus, who founded the Grameen Bank in 1976. He is known as the "father of microcredit," and established the microfinance movement, which aims to help millions of people rural communities to access small loans. For his work, he was awarded a Nobel Peace Prize in 2006. The work that Yunus did through Grameen Bank has been described as a major influence on later social entrepreneurs. Larger countries in Europe and South America have tended to work more closely with public organizations at both the national and local level.

=== Types ===
In The Power of Unreasonable People, John Elkington and Pamela Hartigan describe social entrepreneurs' business structures as falling under three different models, applicable in different situations and economic climates:

1. Leveraged non-profit: This business model leverages financial and other resources in an innovative way to respond to social needs.
2. Hybrid non-profit: This organizational structure can take a variety of forms, but is distinctive because the hybrid non-profit is willing to use profit from some activities to sustain its other operations which have a social or community purpose. Hybrid non-profits are often created to deal with government failures or market failures, as they generate revenue to sustain the operation without requiring loans, grants, and other forms of traditional funding.
3. Social business venture: These models are set up as businesses that are designed to create change through social means. Social business ventures evolved through a lack of funding. Social entrepreneurs in this situation were forced to become for-profit ventures, because loans and equity financing are hard to get for social businesses.

There are also a broader range of hybrid profit models, where a conventional business invests some portion of its profits on socially, culturally or environmentally beneficial activities. The term "Philanthropreneurship" has been applied to this type of activity. Corporate employees can also engage in social entrepreneurship, which may or may not be officially sanctioned by the company. This has been described as corporate social entrepreneurship.

One private foundation has staked the ground of more precise lexicon following the Newman's Own model having coined the phrase "Commercial Philanthropy" where commercial businesses are held and operated with all net proceeds going to serve social service needs.

== International presence ==
Organizations such as the Skoll Foundation, the Omidyar Network, the Schwab Foundation for Social Entrepreneurship, New Profit Inc., National Social Entrepreneurship Forum, and the Global Social Benefit Institute among others, promote and provide resources to advance the initiatives of social entrepreneurs. The North American organizations tend to have an individualistic stance focused on a handful of leaders. For example, The Skoll Foundation, created by eBay's first president, Jeff Skoll, makes capacity-building "mezzanine level" grants to social entrepreneurial organizations that already have reached a certain level of effectiveness.

Acumen is a global group of social entrepreneurs, investors, philanthropists, and social innovators working together to break the cycle of poverty. Since 2001, Acumen have invested in and scaled enterprises in some of the hardest to reach communities in Africa, Pakistan, India and Colombia, impacting hundreds of millions of lives. The Acumen Founders Hub is a free global platform for social entrepreneurs who are looking for support with starting or growing a social enterprise with content organized around How To style questions.

== Role of technology ==
The Internet, social networking websites and social media have been pivotal resources for the success and collaboration of many social entrepreneurs. In the 2000s, the Internet has become especially useful in disseminating information to a wide range of like-minded supporters in short amounts of time, even if these individuals are geographically dispersed. In addition, the Internet allows for the pooling of design resources using open source principles. Using wiki models or crowdsourcing approaches, for example, a social entrepreneur organization can get hundreds of people from across a country (or from multiple countries) to collaborate on joint online projects (e.g., developing a business plan or a marketing strategy for a social entrepreneurship venture).

These websites help social entrepreneurs to disseminate their ideas to broader audiences, help with the formation and maintenance of networks of like-minded people and help to link up potential investors, donors or volunteers with the organization. This enables social entrepreneurs to achieve their goals with little or no start-up capital and little or no "brick and mortar" facilities (e.g., rented office space). For example, the rise of open-source appropriate technology as a sustainable development paradigm enables people all over the world to collaborate on solving local problems, just as open source software development leverages collaboration from software experts from around the world. The COVID-19 pandemic and the need to physically distance has further increased the significance of technologies for social ventures.

== Public opinion ==
=== Controversy ===
Many initiatives carried out with social entrepreneurs while innovative, have had problems becoming sustainable and effective initiatives that ultimately were able to branch out and reach the larger society as a whole (versus a small community or a group of people). Compromises in social initiatives were developed, which often did not reach large audiences or help larger communities. Since the concept of social entrepreneurship has been popularized in the 2000s, some advocates suggest that there needs to be some standardization of the process in scaling up social endeavors to increase the impact of these ventures across the globe.

Policymakers around the globe may need to learn more about social initiatives, to increase the sustainability, effectiveness, and efficiency of these projects. Involvement and collaboration between private corporations and government agencies allows for increased support for carrying out social entrepreneurship initiatives, increased accountability on both ends, and increased connections with communities, individuals, or agencies in need. For example, private organizations or nonprofit organizations have tackled unemployment issues in communities. One challenge is that in some cases, social entrepreneurs may only propose short-term solutions, or that they are unable to scale up their virtual, online organization to a larger degree to maximize the number of people who are helped. Government programs are able to tackle large issues; however, there is often little collaboration between governments and social entrepreneurs, which may have limited the effectiveness of social entrepreneurship. This lack of inter-sectoral collaboration may lead to stagnation, if the motives and goals of social enterprises and of those in policy-making and programs are not aligned. Those in policy-making and the development of delivery of government programs tend to have different priorities than social entrepreneurs, resulting in slow growth and expansion of social initiatives.

Since social entrepreneurship has only started to gain momentum in the 2000s, current social entrepreneurs are encouraging social advocates and activists to develop into innovative social entrepreneurs. Increasing the scope and scale of social entrepreneurship may increase the likelihood of an efficient, sustainable, and effective initiative; although it may also render social entrepreneurship more challenging. Increased participation draws more attention to social entrepreneurship ventures from policymakers and privately owned corporations. The increased involvement of corporations and governments may help to strengthen social entrepreneurship, as it may lead to policy changes and to the development of training programs and leadership development programs for social entrepreneurs. Simultaneously, research shows that as social entrepreneurs attempt to widen their impact and scale their efforts, external institutions will have a key role to play in their success.

== See also ==
- Appropriate technology
- B Corporation (certification)
- Business ethics
- Collaborative method
- Ecopreneurship
- Entrepreneurship
- Geotourism
- List of social entrepreneurs
- Microfranchising
- Outline of management
- Social innovation
- Social venture capital
- Triple bottom line – business theory
