= The Power of Unreasonable People =

2008 non-fiction book

- Author: John Elkington, Pamela Hartigan
- Language: English
- Publisher: Harvard Business Review Press
- Publication date: January 7, 2008
- Pages: 272
- ISBN: 1422104060
- OCLC: 820364879

The Power of Unreasonable People: How Social Entrepreneurs Create Markets that Change the World is a 2008 non-fiction book written by John Elkington and Pamela Hartigan and published by Harvard Business School . The title of the book is based on a quote from Irish playwright George Bernard Shaw: "The reasonable man adapts himself to the world; the unreasonable man persists in trying to adapt the world to himself. Therefore, all progress depends on the unreasonable man." The book focuses on two groups of "Unreasonable People": social entrepreneurs and environmental entrepreneurs.

== Sections ==
The book is divided into three sections:

=== Building Innovative Enterprises ===
The first section of the book discusses in depth the process of creating successful business models and tapping financial resources. Examples discussed include Barefoot College, Aravind Eye Hospital, and Whole Foods Market. The authors also briefly cover different methods of obtaining finances.

One of the fascinating examples of how social entrepreneur Bunker Roy is completely changing remote and destitute villages all over India and beyond is through his business named “Barefoot College”.  The authors' John Elkington and Pamela Hartigan go into more detail of Roy's vision of providing first electric through solar panels and then other essentials to a thriving community such as clean running water, health care, education and jobs.   This book goes into more detail of this one and many more enterprises centered on helping people while creating capital.[2]

=== Creating the Markets of the Future ===
The second section of the book discusses some of the steps necessary to create successful markets. It discusses the identification of market opportunities and raising expectations. Poverty is also discussed, specifically why many of the new social businesses and NGOs are focusing on the bottom of the pyramid markets. Pierre Omidyar, founder of the huge internet marketplace eBay was quoted in saying, “…if you want to have global impact you can’t ignore business…but (aim to create) business models that provoke social change…”. This leads to the exploration of social entrepreneurs who are not averse to making a profit, but think outside the box when it comes to improving communities. Rather than simply distributing aid, social entrepreneurs focus on partnering with members of poorer communities to help them create solutions to their problems using sustainable means - means that are reliant on the abilities of members of those communities rather than the generosity of others.

=== Creating Sustainable and Scalable Change ===
The third section of the book focuses on leadership and sustainable and scalable change. The chapter topics include democratizing technology, changing the system, and scaling solutions.

== Reception ==
In a Stanford Social Innovation Review article, Rick Aubry writes, "Pamela Hartigan and John Elkington have written an essential book for anyone interested in understanding the phenomenon of social entrepreneurship. Their comprehensive and thoughtful book offers a great single source for understanding the amazing variety of social entrepreneurs throughout the world."

The Stanford Social Innovation and Review wrote that The Power of Unreasonable People, “should be on the shortlist of required reading on social entrepreneurship.”
