= Fourth bottom line =

Extension of the triple bottom line framework

Fourth bottom line or quadruple bottom line (QBL) is a concept extended from the triple bottom line; instead of simply focusing on the 3 Ps: people, planet and profit, this concept involves extending to a fourth factor which not only has motivation for a business but also transcends to a humanistic value and beyond by factoring in terms such as "spirituality", "ethics", "purpose", "culture", "compassion".

== Background ==
In traditional business accounting and common usage, the "bottom line" refers to either the "profit" or "loss", which is usually recorded at the very bottom line on a statement of revenue and expenses. Over the last 50 years, environmentalists and "social justice" advocates have struggled to bring a broader definition of bottom line into public consciousness by introducing full cost accounting. For example, if a corporation shows a monetary profit, but their asbestos mine causes thousands of deaths from asbestosis, and their copper mine pollutes a river, and the government ends up spending taxpayer money on health care and river clean-up, how do we perform a full societal cost benefit analysis? The triple bottom line adds two more "bottom lines”: social and environmental (ecological) concerns. With the ratification of the United Nations and ICLEI TBL standard for urban and community accounting in early 2007, this became the dominant approach to public sector full cost accounting. Similar UN standards apply to natural capital and human capital measurement to assist in measurements required by TBL, e.g. the EcoBudget standard for reporting ecological footprint. The TBL seems to be fairly widespread in South African media, as found in a 1990-2008 study of worldwide national newspapers.

== Description ==
The Fourth bottom line is extended from the triple bottom line; instead of simply focusing on the 3 Ps: people, planet and profit, this concept involves extending to a fourth factor which not only has motivation for a business but also transcends to a humanistic value and beyond by factoring in terms such as "spirituality", "ethics", "purpose", "culture", "compassion". On the whole, the multiple bottom lines are a concept that help clearly define parts in the ecosystem. In addition to the above-mentioned triple bottom line's people, planet, and profit, there is a fourth component, purpose.

The term was allegedly first coined and introduced into mainstream usage by Ayman Sawaf (2014) in a bid to factor in the return to one's spiritual self as an additional, fourth bottom line. Spirituality, according to Sawaf, is defined as your own unique relationship and partnership with God or The Divine. However, an earlier reference by Sohail Inayatullah (2005) makes reference to Spirituality as the fourth bottom line in an article in Futures. The sentiment remains. It is great to make money and to have a positive impact on society, people, and the environment. It is also important to have a positive impact on one's own spiritual growth. The fourth bottom line lifts business activities to a sacred form. The fourth bottom line is measured by how much more loving, understanding, happy, joyful, in touch with their destiny, deeper relationship or partnership with god or higher powers the person has become, while performing their business responsibilities. And as these qualities are acquired they are infused back into one's own business activities This definition, thus, identified spirituality as the fourth bottom line by businesses that relate it with happiness of stakeholders. That is when the question of why one is doing business becomes relevant. The first bottom line deals with the what. "What do I get?" is usually measured by money. The second and third bottom lines deal with the how. "How will I do this?" factors in that the means of doing business now matters. The question of whether one is doing business with honesty, trust, character, integrity, without hurting people and the environment. The Fourth Bottom Line has to do with why. To ask oneself, "Why am I doing this?" involves a deeper sense of self being nurtured by such a choice. With the fourth bottom line, commerce/business becomes a spiritual path. The context of spirituality as a fourth factor is further elaborated upon by Dr. Sohail Inayatullah, a professor at Tamkang University and Queensland University of Technology.

The fourth bottom line is also conceptualized based on the fact that improving lives can be a factor valuable enough to rival other business objectives due to being a key motivating factor for any business to continue. The concept introduces the fourth bottom line as being a way to utilize core business principles to factor in compassion, for example by being compassionate to the customers and hence developing value for the business in an altruistic way.

== See also ==
- Double bottom line
