= Robert Rubinstein =

Robert Rubinstein may refer to:

- Robert A. Rubinstein (born 1951), cultural anthropologist
- Robert J. Rubinstein (born 1952), social entrepreneur
