= Mauricio L. Miller =

- Born: 1946 (age 79–80); Nogales, Arizona
- Occupation: Social entrepreneur
- Years active: 1979-present
- Known for: Family Independence Initiative

Mauricio L. Miller is an American social entrepreneur, public speaker and author, based in Oakland, California. He is founder of the non-profit organization Community Independence Initiative. and the Center for Peer-Driven Change

== Early life and education ==
Though his parents lived in Mexico, Miller was born in 1946 in Nogales, Arizona. His parents divorced when Miller was two years old; at the age of 9, he emigrated to San Jose, California with his mother Berta and his sister.

Miller graduated from C.K. McClatchy High School in Sacramento and attended the University of California, Berkeley, graduating with a B.S. in engineering. He worked as an engineer until being drafted by the U.S. Army in 1969. He served one tour of duty in Vietnam; after being honorably discharged, he returned to engineering.

== Career ==
In 1973, after the death of his mother, Miller quit engineering and pursued a career in product design for several years, earning a M.A. in design at UC Berkeley. In 1978 he switched to social services and joined Asian Neighborhood Design, a San Francisco/Oakland-based community development agency, where he initially worked to train gang kids in construction and help them find employment. He became executive director in 1980, and served in that capacity for 20 years. The organization was recognized by President Bill Clinton for its services; however, Miller believed these programs did not do enough to help poor families.

In 2001, after a discussion with Jerry Brown (then the mayor of Oakland), Miller founded the Family Independence Initiative which sought to study how low-income families could better plan their own finances and help one another. The program collected monthly progress data and paid families for their time in providing the information. The program provided no direct services, instead taking a "hands-off" approach. Families under the program utilized data to track their own behaviors and follow their successful peers. As of August 2017, the organization had worked with more than 2,000 families in 10 U.S. cities. The work has now expanded internationally with projects in 19 different sites and 11 countries.

Miller has written for the Huffington Post and on Medium. His first book, The Alternative: Most of What You Believe About Poverty Is Wrong was published in August 2017.

Miller has served on the board of directors of the National Cooperative Bank, Development Corporation; the board of the Corporation for Enterprise Development; the Board of Public/Private Ventures; and the board of the California Endowment and The Hitachi Foundation.

== Recognitions and awards ==
In 1999, Miller was invited by then-President Bill Clinton to the State of the Union address in recognition of his work with Asian Neighborhood Design.

Miller was elected an Ashoka Fellow in 2011.

In 2012, he was awarded a Genius Grant by the John D. and Catherine T. MacArthur Foundation. He also received the In Harmony with Hope award from the Elfenworks Foundation.

In 2013, Miller was awarded the Prime Mover Fellowship.

In 2014, Miller was awarded the Purpose Prize for Financial Inclusion.
