= Julia Hailes =

British author (born 1961)

Julia Hailes (born 1961) is a British author who first came to prominence in 1988, when she wrote The Green Consumer Guide which sold a million copies worldwide. She subsequently wrote The New Green Consumer Guide published in 2007. She has authored or co-authored nine books. In 1989, she was elected to the UN Global 500 Roll of Honour for ‘outstanding environmental achievements'.

== Early life ==
Julia Hailes grew up near Ham Hill in Somerset. She attended Knighton House Girls' Prep School in Dorset; and St Mary's School in Calne, Wiltshire.

== Career ==
In 1986, Hailes and John Elkington co-founded SustainAbility Ltd, a think tank consultancy that now has offices in London, Washington and Zurich, with another planned later in 2008 in India. She has written nine books, including the best-selling Green Consumer Guide, which was published in 1988 and sold over 1 million copies worldwide.

Hailes has been a director of Jupiter Global Green Investment Trust and co-founded Haller -- Releasing Potential, a charity supporting eco-system projects after meeting Dr. Rene Haller as a fellow Global 500 Laureate and Louise Piper. She has been on the board of Out of this World chain of ethical supermarkets, the Ecos Trust, Wastewatch, Keep Britain Tidy and sat on the Food Ethics Council, as well as co-founding E for Good, which campaigned on waste electrical products.

She is an environmental campaigner and a sustainability consultant advising a number of multinational companies, including Marks & Spencer, Reckitt Benckiser, Morrisons, McDonald's, Shell, Numis Investment Bank and Procter & Gamble. She also regularly makes speeches and presentations, writes articles - and a blog.

== Personal life ==
She lives in Dorset with her three sons, Connor, Rollo and Monty.

== Awards and honors ==
In 1989, Hailes was elected to the UN `Global 500 Roll of Honour’ for ‘outstanding environmental achievements' and in 1999 was awarded an MBE in the New Years Honors List.
