= Consumer guide =

Consumer guide or Consumer Guide may refer to the following:

== Publications ==
- Robert Christgau's "Consumer Guide", a column in The Village Voice
- Christgau's Consumer Guide: Albums of the '90s, a book collecting reviews from Christgau's column during the 1990s
- The New Green Consumer Guide, a lifestyle book by Julia Hailes

== See also ==
- Consumer protection
- Consumer Reports
