= Triple top line =

The triple top line (abbreviated as TTL or 3TL) is a concept that aims to create a business strategy that ensures positive value in terms of social, economic and ecological aspects since the beginning of the product development by an enterprise. This concept proposes a shift from the theory of Triple Bottom Line (TBL) to the Triple Top Line in order to advocate for the maximization of positive impacts rather than only neutralizing resultant negative impacts from the business activity as the authors from TBL suggests. The theory was first proposed by William McDonough and Michael Braungart in 2002.

Examples of good impacts towards economic, social and ecological aspects in a business can be, per example, the creation of a safe environment for the workers (social) or the development of textile with safe ingredients which could be transformed into compose for the soil (ecological). The triple top line can be applied in business chains and be adapted to be used broadly rather than only on the design of products and facilities as first thought by McDonough and Braungart. Many authors have applied the concept on different field and projects such as on construction and on a South African cotton supply chain.

== Definition ==
The triple top line is defined as an approach that aims the maximization of positive impacts on the environmental, economical and social aspects since the start of the development of a new product or process. To McDonough and Braungart, the concept would help enterprises to maximize positive impacts in the three dimensions, enhancing and promoting them. According to them, the "value and quality are embodied in products, processes and facilities so intelligently designed, they leave footprints to delight in rather than lament".

Also, the concept proposes that the accountability should be adressed in the beginning of the creation process. In this way, during the start of elaborating a new product or process, the three dimensions should be withhold and tackled instead of beign managed afterwards.

To illustrate the theory, McDonough and Braungart designed a "fractal triangle", where each corner would represent one of the three values (social, economics and environment) and, in turn, each of them present three subtriangles to represent the combinations between them. In this sense, the model would present nine components. The authors stated that zones which occur overlapping of values presented especially rich opportunities. In a application of the theory for designing a team, Mirsky and Songer moved around the triangle through the values and the nine components to investigate which combination would maximize the positive impacts within the whole system.

The triple top line can be mentioned as a "3E strategy" by Edgeman and Wu, which correponds to actions based on socially equitable, ecologically sensitive and economically sound strategy. To them, the application of that strategy would result in the production of triple bottom line performance, or, as they stated, the 3Ps.

== Contextualization ==
=== The authors ===
The concept of triple top line was first mentioned by the American architect William McDonough and the German chemist Michael Braungart. The authors are known for the book Cradle to Cradle: Remaking the Way We Make Things, in which they detail how to achieve a new type of industry that overlooks for recycling back to the soil or to another product and for a better life-cycle of the product itself. For the authors, everything that is produced should be designed to be reused since the beginning without causing any harm to the environment. Together, they also founded in the middle of 1990's the McDonough Braungart Design Chemistry, a company focused on offering consulting to business and governments, such as Gap and Ford in order to create greener buildings.

=== Background ===
The triple top line tackles the development and ensurement of sustainability, as an alternaive to TBL. According to Lodder et al., the concern with the environment and negative impacts on it resulted by business and industrial activities got on focus during 1960s, with written works like "Silent Spring" and "The Limits to Growth". In addition, the concern has also gained attention with meetings and the release of reports that adressed sustainable development as the main theme. Some examples of reports and meetings in this period are: the Brundtland report in 1987 and the Earth Summit happened in Rio de Janeiro in 1992. To Elkington, businesses and governments faced three phases of pressure and made resultant responses. While the first during the 1960s and 1970s tackled the environmental legislation, the second focused on green comsumption and the third was chacterized by corporate governances.

== Relation with other concepts ==
=== Earlier concepts ===
According to Lodder and colleagues (one of them was Michael Braungart), the creation of the triple top line is rooted in other previous concepts proposed by Braungart and associates. Those theories would be the Intelligent Product System, the Hannover Principles, the intelligent materials, the book Cradle to Cradle: Remaking the Way We Make Things and upcycling. Also, to create the theory, McDonough and Braungart have proposed the shift from eco-efficiency to eco-effectiveness. Finally, the concept of cradle to cradle would have been used as a business model to designings products, ensuring previous upcycling and better life-cycle.

=== Relation to the Triple Bottom Line (TBL) ===
In response to the debates around sustainable development, John Elkington (business author) coined the Triple bottom line in 1994 as a way to explain the principle of sustainable development with practices like the eco-efficiency. In this sense, organizations would colaborate with three main points: people, profit and planet. To Lee and Burian, the concept is used to operationalise the three main dimensions of sustainability.

While, the triple bottom line focuses on aligning sustainability and the intentions of a business when it comes to profit, whereas triple top line is a focus to align sustainability and business profitability from the inception of a product. The TTL approach is an integral part of the process from the beginning of a product's development through its future development and marketing strategic planning. In this sense, the theory is presented as an alternative to the triple bottom line, which would only try to limit harm to social and environmental aspects, according to the authors.

McDonough and Braungart present the triple top line as a response to the TBL under the argument that that theory would focus only on reducing the liabilities and negative impacts instead of looking for the creation of positive ones. The authors acknowledge the importancy of TBL to the rise of the sustainable agenda within organizations. To them, TBL aims to reduce or internalise bad externalities, while the triple top line tries to increase positive externlities in the social and environmental aspects. And, alongside with the creation of this new concept, the authors criticised the concept of eco-efficiency, defending that it would be inefficient due to its work within the same system that caused the problem, what would not produce a real change. As an alternative, they propose the eco-effectiveness, which was a term earlier described by Schaltegger and Sturm. While eco-efficiency is a relative tool for improving a system, eco-effectiveness is a normative indicator to measure a goal with an agenda that brings together environmental, social and economic benefits.

The theories also differ on timing during the production. While the TBL looks for mitigating impacts in the end of the process, the TTL brings the accountability to the beginning of the development process.

In an application of both theories in one model to water distribution systems, Lee and Burian stated a contrast between them. They described that both frameworks tackle the sustainable dimensions. On one hand, the triple top line overviews the quality and benefits and stresses about the interrelation between the dimensions. The TTL would also pay attention on how different product processes could intertwine. In this sense, it tries to fit the input of one with the output of the another. According to Lee and Burian, the TBL, on the other hand, would only concentrate in minimising the impacts.

== Applicability ==
The teory was applied not only by their funders, but also by some other authors in different fields, such as product and facility design, construction, supply chain, enterprise strategy and governance and water infrastructure.

== See also ==
- Triple bottom line
- Cradle-to-cradle design
- Cradle to Cradle: Remaking the Way We Make Things
- Michael Braungart
- William McDonough
- Sustainable development
