= Ayman Sawaf =

American social entrepreneur, author and musician

- Born: September 18, 1953
- Died: March 1, 2022 (aged 68)
- Education: Industrial System Engineer (OSU) Business Studies (IMD)
- Occupations: Social entrepreneur, author, and musician
- Years active: 1977 - 2021
- Organization(s): Sacred Commerce, KidsEQ, Aytopia
- Movement: Emotional Literacy Emotional Intelligence Sacred Commerce
- Spouse: Rowan Gabrielle
- Children: 3
- Website: aymansawaf.com

Ayman Sawaf was an American social commentator, film producer, entrepreneur, musician and author.

Sawaf wrote extensively about emotional intelligence and its uses in business, parenting and personal development.

== Career ==
Sawaf claimed to be a creator of the concept of emotional literacy (EL) as the foundation of social and emotional learning (SEL). He also claimed to be a pioneer of emotional intelligence (EQ), and a co-creator of the Four Cornerstone Model.

Sawaf was a founder of Nouran Lighting, Enchanté Entertainment, Real Music, Wholelife, and Aytopia. Sawaf provided consulting services to international businesses and made speeches worldwide. He spoke on emotional intelligence at conferences in the US, Mexico, South Africa, and Egypt.

Sawaf was executive producer of two children's films ("Magic Boat" & "Palooka") and three thirteen-episode television series ("Bed Time Stories" and "Mrs. Piggle Wiggle")

In 2019, Sawaf moved his family and businesses to Lebanon .

Sawaf released 13 albums and co-founded a New Age record label, Real Music. He released music as a solo artist as "Ayman" and under the name of his band, "Happy The Man".

== Key Concepts ==
=== Emotional Literacy ===
Sawaf claimed to have coined the term, 'emotional literacy' in 1997:

"Emotional Literacy is the ability to recognize, understand and appropriately express our emotions. It is the first step towards building our Emotional Intelligence (EQ) and the cornerstone of Emotional and Social Learning (SEL)," as published in The Emotional Literacy Series.

=== Emotional Intelligence ===
"Emotional Intelligence is the ability to sense, understand, and effectively apply the power and acumen of emotions as a source of human energy, information, connection and influence," as published in by Robert Cooper & Ayman Sawaf.

In 1996, Sawaf and Robert Cooper published the book, "Executive EQ: Emotional Intelligence in Leadership and Organizations". They claimed that it was the first book to introduce emotional intelligence to the business world. "Executive EQ" is published in 17 languages across 28 countries. In collaboration with Essi Systems, a consulting company, Cooper and Sawaf included an EQ Map in the book.

Ayman Sawaf also contributed to other books on emotional intelligence, including

- "The Modern Day Alchemist from the Land of the Pharaohs",
- "Flip: Turn Your World Around"
- "Emotions at Work: Theory, Research and Applications for Management" edited by Roy L. Payne & Cary L. Cooper.

=== Sacred Commerce ===
Sawaf's book, Sacred Commerce: A Blueprint for a new Humanity, explores the history of commerce through the stories of the merchant priesthood in Ancient Egypt.

The book also introduces the concept of the fourth bottom line (purpose), which Sawaf called a new map for self-realization through business and sourced in emotional alchemy, resonance causation, and the "Forgotten Ingredient of Leadership"

== Discography ==
- Moon Shines Last (1992)
- Dancing With My Soul (1994)
- Doorways (1996)
- Midnight Storyteller (2006)
- The Best of Ayman (2006)
- Namya's Return (2015)
- The Blue Door (2015)

== Books ==
- The Age of Consciousness: Surfing the Disruption (2020)
- Sacred Commerce: A Blueprint for a New Humanity with Rowan Gabrielle (2014)
- Sacred Commerce: The Rise of the Global Citizen with Rowan Gabrielle (2007)
- Executive EQ: Emotional Intelligence in Leadership and Organizations with Robert Cooper (1997)
- The Full Original Emotional Literacy Series (Kids EQ) - 21 books (1989)
