= National Social Entrepreneurship Forum =

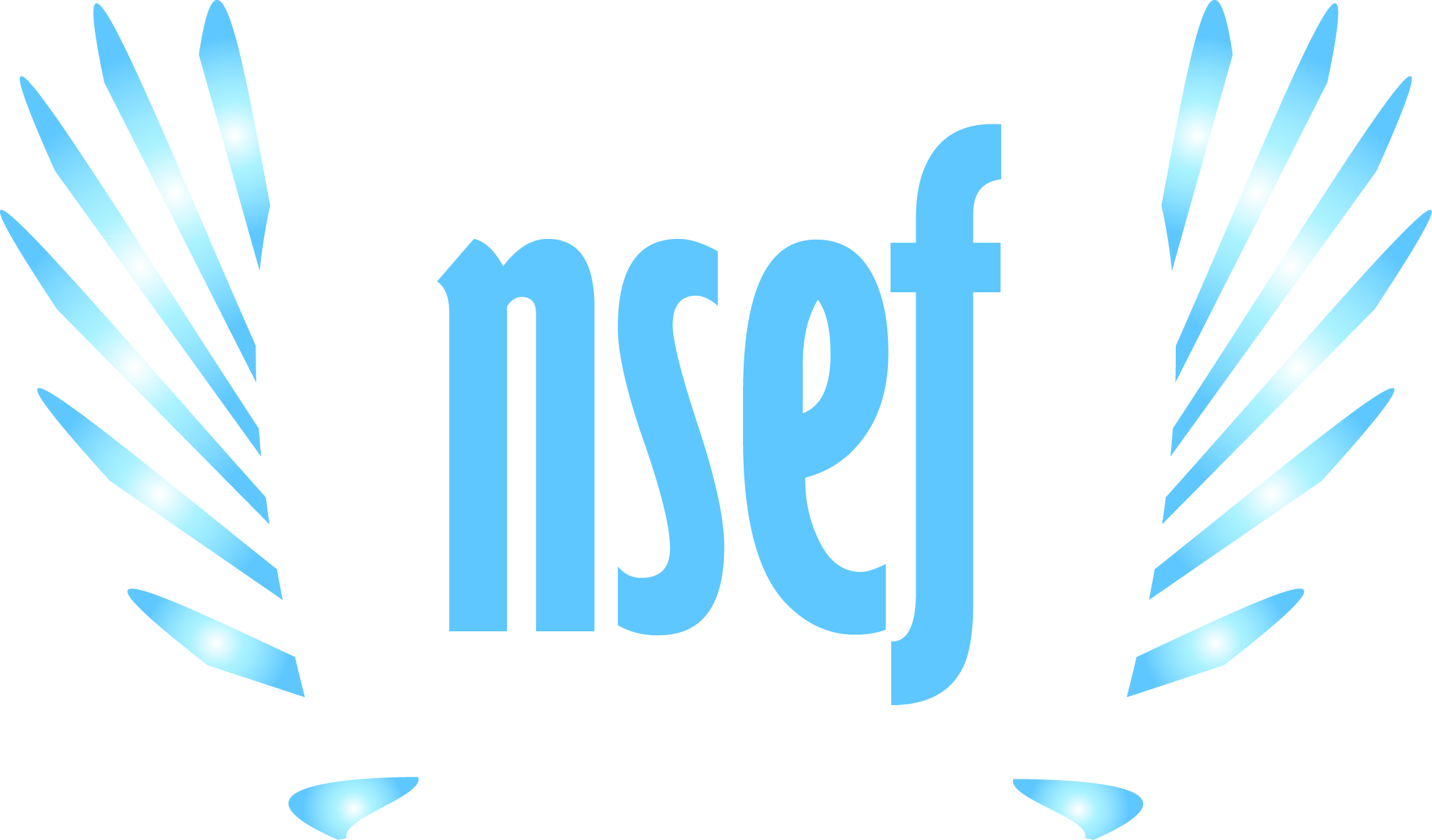
- Founded: February 2009
- Type: Non Profit
- Location: Headquarters in Bangalore, Karnataka, India
- Website: http://nsef-india.org

National Social Entrepreneurship Forum (NSEF) is a non-profit organization supporting youth-driven social innovations & entrepreneurship in India.

== History ==
National Social Entrepreneurship Forum was founded by Yashveer Singh and Srikumar Murthy G in 2009 at Bangalore, India. Since its inception, NSEF has undertaken social entrepreneurial activities in several academic institutes and cities across India and has worked in collaboration with various organizations such as Villgro, Samhita Social Ventures, NASSCOM Social Innovation Honours, Ashoka Innovators for the Public, and Sankalp Forum to enable youth-driven social innovations and young social entrepreneurs. NSEF has trained thousands of students through its programs across India.

== Programs ==
- NSEF Idea Conferences - A platform to educate students about social innovations and to provide them with a launch pad for their social entrepreneurial ideas.
- NSEF Authors of Change Program - A solutions delivery program for key challenges that social organizations are facing, by connecting them to student talent from across the country through internships.
- NSEF Fellowship - A support program for students who start social ventures after completing college, to connect them with the resources and network they would need to grow their ventures.
