= Triple bottom line =

Accounting framework

Graphic describing the three types of bottom lines

The triple bottom line (or otherwise noted as TBL or 3BL) is an accounting framework with three parts: social, environmental (or ecological) and economic. Some organizations have adopted the TBL framework to evaluate their performance in a broader perspective to create greater business value. Business writer John Elkington claims to have coined the phrase in 1994.

== Background ==
In traditional business accounting and common usage, the "bottom line" refers to either the "profit" or "loss", which is usually recorded at the very bottom line on a statement of revenue and expenses. Over the last 50 years, environmentalists and social justice advocates have struggled to bring a broader definition of bottom line into public consciousness by introducing full cost accounting. For example, if a corporation shows a monetary profit, but their asbestos mine causes thousands of deaths from asbestosis, and their copper mine pollutes a river, and the government ends up spending taxpayer money on health care and river clean-up, how can we capture a fuller societal cost benefit analysis? The triple bottom line adds two more "bottom lines": social and environmental (ecological) concerns. With the ratification of the United Nations and ICLEI TBL standard for urban and community accounting in early 2007, this became the dominant approach to public sector full cost accounting. Similar UN standards apply to natural capital and human capital measurement to assist in measurements required by TBL, e.g. the EcoBudget standard for reporting ecological footprint. Use of the TBL is fairly widespread in South African media, as found in a 1990–2008 study of worldwide national newspapers.

An example of an organization seeking a triple bottom line would be a social enterprise run as a non-profit, but earning income by offering opportunities for handicapped people who have been labelled "unemployable", to earn a living by recycling. The organization earns a profit, which is invested back into the community. The social benefit is the meaningful employment of disadvantaged citizens, and the reduction in the society's welfare or disability costs. The environmental benefit comes from the recycling accomplished. In the private sector, a commitment to corporate social responsibility (CSR) implies an obligation to public reporting about the business's substantial impact for the better of the environment and people. Triple bottom line is one framework for reporting this material impact. This is distinct from the more limited changes required to deal only with ecological issues. The triple bottom line has also been extended to encompass four pillars, known as the quadruple bottom line (QBL) or fourth bottom line. The fourth pillar denotes a future-oriented approach (future generations, intergenerational equity, etc.). It is a long-term outlook that sets sustainable development and sustainability concerns apart from previous social, environmental, and economic considerations.

The challenges of putting the TBL into practice relate to the measurement of social and ecological categories. Despite this, the TBL framework enables organizations to take a longer-term perspective and thus evaluate the future consequences of decisions.

== Definition ==
Sustainable development was defined by the Brundtland Commission of the United Nations in 1987 at the time when there was a growing realization that finance was the most tool to develop sustainability. Triple bottom line (TBL) accounting expands the traditional reporting framework to take into account social and environmental performance in addition to financial performance.

In 1981, Freer Spreckley first articulated the triple bottom line framework in a publication called Social Audit - A Management Tool for Co-operative Working. In this work, he argued that enterprises should measure and report on financial performance, social wealth creation, and environmental responsibility. The phrase "triple bottom line" was articulated more fully by John Elkington in his 1997 book Cannibals with Forks: the Triple Bottom Line of 21st Century Business, where he adopted a question asked by the Polish poet Stanisław Lec, "Is it progress if a cannibal uses a fork?" as the opening line of his foreword. Elkington suggests that it can be, particularly in the case of "sustainable capitalism", wherein competing corporate entities seek to maintain their relative position by addressing people and planet issues as well as profit maximisation.

A Triple Bottom Line Investing group advocating and publicizing these principles was founded in 1998 by Robert J. Rubinstein.

For reporting their efforts companies may demonstrate their commitment to corporate social responsibility (CSR) through the following:

- Top-level involvement (CEO, Board of Directors)
- Policy Investments
- Programs
- Signatories to voluntary standards
- Principles (UN Global Compact-Ceres Principles)
- Reporting (Global Reporting Initiative)

The concept of TBL demands that a company's responsibility lies with stakeholders rather than shareholders. In this case, "stakeholders" refers to anyone who is influenced, either directly or indirectly, by the actions of the firm. Examples of stakeholders include employees, customers, suppliers, local residents, government agencies, and creditors. According to the stakeholder theory, the business entity should be used as a vehicle for coordinating stakeholder interests, instead of maximizing shareholder (owner) profit. A growing number of financial institutions incorporate a triple bottom line approach in their work. It is at the core of the business of banks in the Global Alliance for Banking on Values, for example.

The Detroit-based Avalon International Breads interprets the triple bottom line as consisting of "Earth", "Community", and "Employees".

=== The three bottom lines ===
The triple bottom line consists of social equity, economic, and environmental factors. The phrase, "people, planet, and profit" to describe the triple bottom line and the goal of sustainability, was coined by John Elkington in 1994 while at SustainAbility, and was later used as the title of the Anglo-Dutch oil company Shell's first sustainability report in 1997. As a result, one country in which the 3P concept took deep root was The Netherlands.

==== People, the social equity bottom line ====
The people, social equity, or human capital bottom line pertains to fair and beneficial business practices toward labour and the community and region in which a corporation conducts its business. A TBL company conceives a reciprocal social structure in which the well-being of corporate, labour and other stakeholder interests are interdependent.

An enterprise dedicated to the triple bottom line seeks to provide benefit to many constituencies and not to exploit or endanger any group of them. The "up streaming" of a portion of profit from the marketing of finished goods back to the original producer of raw materials, for example, a farmer in fair trade agricultural practice, is a common feature. In concrete terms, a TBL business would not use child labour and monitor all contracted companies for child labour exploitation, would pay fair salaries to its workers, would maintain a safe work environment and tolerable working hours, and would not otherwise exploit a community or its labour force. A TBL business also typically seeks to "give back" by contributing to the strength and growth of its community with such things as health care and education. Quantifying this bottom line is relatively new, problematic and often subjective. The Global Reporting Initiative (GRI) has developed guidelines to enable corporations and NGOs alike to comparably report on the social impact of a business.

==== Planet, the environmental bottom line ====
The planet, environmental bottom line, or natural capital bottom line refers to sustainable environmental practices. A TBL company endeavors to benefit the natural order as much as possible or at the least do no harm and minimize environmental impact. A TBL endeavour reduces its ecological footprint by, among other things, carefully managing its consumption of energy and non-renewables and reducing manufacturing waste as well as rendering waste less toxic before disposing of it in a safe and legal manner. "Cradle to grave" is uppermost in the thoughts of TBL manufacturing businesses, which typically conduct a life cycle assessment of products to determine what the true environmental cost is from the growth and harvesting of raw materials to manufacture to distribution to eventual disposal by the end user.

Currently, the cost of disposing of non-degradable or toxic products is born financially and environmentally by future generations, the governments, and residents near the disposal site and elsewhere. In TBL thinking, an enterprise which produces and markets a product which will create a waste problem should not be given a free ride by society. It would be more equitable for the business which manufactures and sells a problematic product to bear part of the cost of its ultimate disposal.

Ecologically destructive practices, such as overfishing or other endangering depletions of resources are avoided by TBL companies. Often environmental sustainability is the more profitable course for a business in the long run. Arguments that it costs more to be environmentally sound are often specious when the course of the business is analyzed over a period of time. Generally, sustainability reporting metrics are better quantified and standardized for environmental issues than for social ones. A number of respected reporting institutes and registries exist including the Global Reporting Initiative, CERES, Institute for Sustainability and others.

The ecological bottom line is akin to the concept of eco-capitalism.

==== Profit, the economic bottom line ====
The profit or economic bottom line deals with the economic value created by the organization after deducting the cost of all inputs, including the cost of the capital tied up. It therefore differs from traditional accounting definitions of profit. In the original concept, within a sustainability framework, the "profit" aspect needs to be seen as the real economic benefit enjoyed by the host society. It is the real economic impact the organization has on its economic environment. This is often confused to be limited to the internal profit made by a company or organization (which nevertheless remains an essential starting point for the computation). Therefore, an original TBL approach cannot be interpreted as simply traditional corporate accounting profit plus social and environmental impacts unless the "profits" of other entities are included as a social benefit.

== Subsequent development ==
Following the initial publication of the triple bottom line concept, students and practitioners have sought greater detail in how the pillars can be evaluated. The people concept, for example, can be viewed as three dimensions – organisational needs, individual needs, and community issues.

Equally, profit is a function of both a healthy sales stream, which needs a high focus on customer service, coupled with the adoption of a strategy to develop new customers to replace those that die away, and planet can be divided into a multitude of subdivisions, although reduce, reuse and recycle is a succinct way of steering through this division.

The initial understanding is now supplanted by thinking beyond TBL: added to the TBL concept of economics, ethics and environment is the idea of thinking of the environment as a mantel that the other pillars hold up, and add to Economics and Ethics, the notions of Energy, and Health or the 4 E's.

== Supporting arguments ==
The following business-based arguments support the concept of TBL:

- Reaching untapped market potential: TBL companies can find financially profitable niches which were missed when money alone was the driving factor. Examples include:
1. Adding ecotourism or geotourism to an already rich tourism market such as the Dominican Republic
2. Developing profitable methods to assist existing NGOs with their missions such as fundraising, reaching clients, or creating networking opportunities with multiple NGOs
3. Providing products or services which benefit underserved populations and/or the environment which are also financially profitable.
- Adapting to new business sectors: While the number of social enterprises is growing, and with the entry of the B Corp movement, there is more demand from consumers and investors for an accounting for social and environmental impact. For example, Fair Trade and Ethical Trade companies require ethical and sustainable practices from all of their suppliers and service providers.

Government fiscal policies usually claim to be concerned with identifying social and natural deficits on a less formal basis. However, such choices may be guided more by ideology than by economics. The primary benefit of embedding one approach to measurement of these deficits would be first to direct monetary policy to reduce them, and eventually achieve a global monetary reform by which they could be systematically and globally reduced in some uniform way.

The argument is that the Earth's carrying capacity is at risk, and that in order to avoid catastrophic breakdown of climate or ecosystems, there is need for comprehensive reform of global financial institutions similar in scale to what was undertaken at the Bretton Woods Conference in 1944.

With the emergence of an externally consistent green economics and agreement on definitions of potentially contentious terms such as full-cost accounting, natural capital and social capital, the prospect of formal metrics for ecological and social loss or risk has grown less remote since the 1990s.

In the United Kingdom in particular, the London Health Observatory has undertaken a formal programme to address social deficits via a fuller understanding of what "social capital" is, how it functions in a real community (that being the City of London), and how losses of it tend to require both financial capital and significant political and social attention from volunteers and professionals to help resolve. The data they rely on is extensive, building on decades of statistics of the Greater London Council since World War II. Similar studies have been undertaken in North America.

Studies of the value of Earth have tried to determine what might constitute an ecological or natural life deficit. The Kyoto Protocol relies on some measures of this sort, and actually relies on some value of life calculations that, among other things, are explicit about the ratio of the price of a human life between developed and developing nations (about 15 to 1). While the motive of this number was to simply assign responsibility for a cleanup, such stark honesty opens not just an economic but political door to some kind of negotiation — presumably to reduce that ratio in time to something seen as more equitable. As it is, people in developed nations can be said to benefit 15 times more from ecological devastation than in developing nations, in pure financial terms. According to the IPCC, they are thus obliged to pay 15 times more per life to avoid a loss of each such life to climate change — the Kyoto Protocol seeks to implement exactly this formula, and is therefore sometimes cited as a first step towards getting nations to accept formal liability for damage inflicted on ecosystems shared globally.

Advocacy for triple bottom line reforms is common in Green Parties. Some of the measures undertaken in the European Union towards the Euro currency integration standardize the reporting of ecological and social losses in such a way as to seem to endorse in principle the notion of unified accounts, or unit of account, for these deficits.

To address financial bottom line profitability concerns, some argue that focusing on the TBL will indeed increase profit for the shareholders in the long run. In practice, John Mackey, CEO of Whole Foods, uses Whole Foods' Community Giving Days as an example. On days when Whole Foods donates 5% of their sales to charity, this action benefits the community, creates goodwill with customers, and energizes employees, which may lead to increased, sustainable profitability in the long-run.

Furthermore, planning a sustainability strategy with the triple bottom line in mind could save companies a lot of money if a disaster were to strike. For example, when BP spilled "two hundred million gallons of oil in the Gulf of Mexico", it cost the company "billions". This company focused mostly on the financial and economic costs of this disaster, instead of the company’s environmental bottom line, furthering damage to the company and its reputation.

== Adoption ==
Timothy Slaper and Tanya Hall identified General Electric (GE), Unilever, Procter and Gamble, 3M and a private company, Cascade Engineering, as examples of businesses using TBL. GE referred to TBL benefits associated with their electron beam emitting technology investment in 2008. Danish company Novo's consolidated financial statements for 2019 were supplemented by a "consolidated social statement" and a "consolidated environmental statement".

== Criticism ==
While many people agree with the importance of good social conditions and preservation of the environment, there are also many who disagree with the triple bottom line as the way to enhance these conditions. The following are the reasons why:

- Reductive method: Concurrently the environment comes to be treated as an externality or background feature, an externality that tends not to have the human dimension build into its definition. Thus, in many writings, even in those critical of the triple-bottom-line approach, the social becomes a congeries of miscellaneous considerations left over from the other two prime categories. Alternative approaches, such as Circles of Sustainability, that treat the economic as a social domain, alongside and in relation to the ecological, the political and the cultural are now being considered as more appropriate for understanding institutions, cities and regions.
- Inertia: The difficulty of achieving global agreement on simultaneous policy may render such measures at best advisory, and thus unenforceable. For example, people may be unwilling to undergo a depression or even sustained recession to replenish lost ecosystems.
- Application: According to Fred Robins' The Challenge of TBL: A Responsibility to Whom? one of the major weaknesses of the TBL framework is its ability to be applied in the practical world.
- Equating ecology with environment: TBL is seen to be disregarding ecological sustainability with environmental effects, where in reality both economic and social viability is dependent on environmental well-being. While greenwashing is not new, its use has increased over recent years to meet consumer demand for environmentally friendly goods and services. The problem is compounded by lax enforcement by regulatory agencies such as the Federal Trade Commission in the United States, the Competition Bureau in Canada, and the Committee of Advertising Practice and the Broadcast Committee of Advertising Practice in the United Kingdom. Critics of the practice suggest that the rise of greenwashing, paired with ineffective regulation, contributes to consumer skepticism of all green claims, and diminishes the power of the consumer in driving companies toward greener solutions for manufacturing processes and business operation.
- Time dimension: While the triple bottom line incorporates the social, economical and environmental (People, Planet, Profit) dimensions of sustainable development, it does not explicitly address the fourth dimension: time. The time dimension focuses on preserving current value in all three other dimensions for later. This means assessment of short term, longer term and long term consequences of any action.
- "One problem with the triple bottom line is that the three separate accounts cannot easily be added up. It is difficult to measure the planet and people accounts in the same terms as profits—that is, in terms of cash." This has led to TBL being augmented with cost-benefit analysis in Triple Bottom Line Cost Benefit Analysis (TBL-CBA).
- Performance/eco-efficiency: According to Rambaud, A. & Richard, J., "the TBL model [...] is based on the concept of ‘eco-efficiency’. In his seminal book, Elkington [...] gives a fundamental role to eco-efficiency in constructing the TBL model. According to him, the development of the concept of eco-efficiency allowed the development of the TBL model, a framework that he believes can save businesspeople from ecological communism". Eco-efficiency is equivalent to weak sustainability and corresponds to a relative measure of socio-environmental impacts compared to value creation. In this, eco-efficiency differs from eco-effectiveness, which is concerned with the absolute measurement of these impacts. A company can therefore increase its socio-environmental impacts and increase its eco-efficiency, if at the same time it increases its value creation even more. The TBL is thus the dedicated reporting system structuring this notion of performance at the expense of eco-effectiveness. Yet eco-efficiency is at the heart of rebound effects and cannot be a credible basis for ecosystem management in particular.
- Elkington himself has called for a rethink on TBL and a "product recall" on use of the concept. He argues that the original idea was to encourage businesses to manage the wider economic, social and environmental impacts of their operations, but its practical use as an accounting tool has now undermined its value. More precisely, he explains "It [Triple Bottom Line] was supposed to provoke deeper thinking about capitalism and its future, but many early adopters understood the concept as a balancing act, adopting a trade-off mentality. [...] Such experimentation [de la TBL] is clearly vital — and typically sparks a proliferation of potential solutions. But the bewildering range of options now on offer can provide business with an alibi for inaction. Worse, we have conspicuously failed to benchmark progress across these options, on the basis of their real-world impact and performance".

In short, the criticisms can be summarised as:

- attempting to divert the attention of regulators and deflating pressure for regulatory change;
- seeking to persuade critics, such as non-government organisations, that they are both well-intentioned and have changed their ways;
- seeking to expand market share at the expense of those rivals not involved in greenwashing; this is especially attractive if little or no additional expenditure is required to change performance; alternatively, a company can engage in greenwashing in an attempt to narrow the perceived 'green' advantage of a rival;
- reducing staff turnover and making it easier to attract staff in the first place;
- making the company seem attractive for potential investors, especially those interested in ethical investment or socially responsive investment;
- inability to add up the three accounts unless tools such as cost-benefit analysis or eco-efficiency (weak sustainability performance) are added to put social and environmental externalities in monetary terms.

In response to these limitations, the concept of the "Triple Depreciation Line" (also called "CARE - Comprehensive Accounting in Respect of Ecology - model") has been proposed.

== Legislation ==
A focus on people, planet and profit has led to legislation changes around the world, often through social enterprise or social investment or through the introduction of a new legal form, the community interest company. In the United States, the BCorp movement has been part of a call for legislation change to allow and encourage a focus on social and environmental impact, with BCorp a legal form for a company focused on "stakeholders, not just shareholders".

In Western Australia, the triple bottom line was adopted as a part of the State Sustainability Strategy, and accepted by the Government of Western Australia but its status was increasingly marginalised by subsequent premiers Alan Carpenter and Colin Barnett.

== See also ==
- B Corporation (certification)
- Bottom of the pyramid
- Circles of Sustainability
- Community interest company
- Conscious business
- Double bottom line, a similar concept predating the UN standard
- EC3 Global
- Eco-capitalism
- Grassroots Business Fund
- Impact investing
- Low-profit limited liability company
- Permaculture ethics
- Public opinion
- Social entrepreneurship
- Triple top line
- True cost accounting
- Value network
- Value network analysis
