= Robert J. Rubinstein =

Robert Jacques Rubinstein
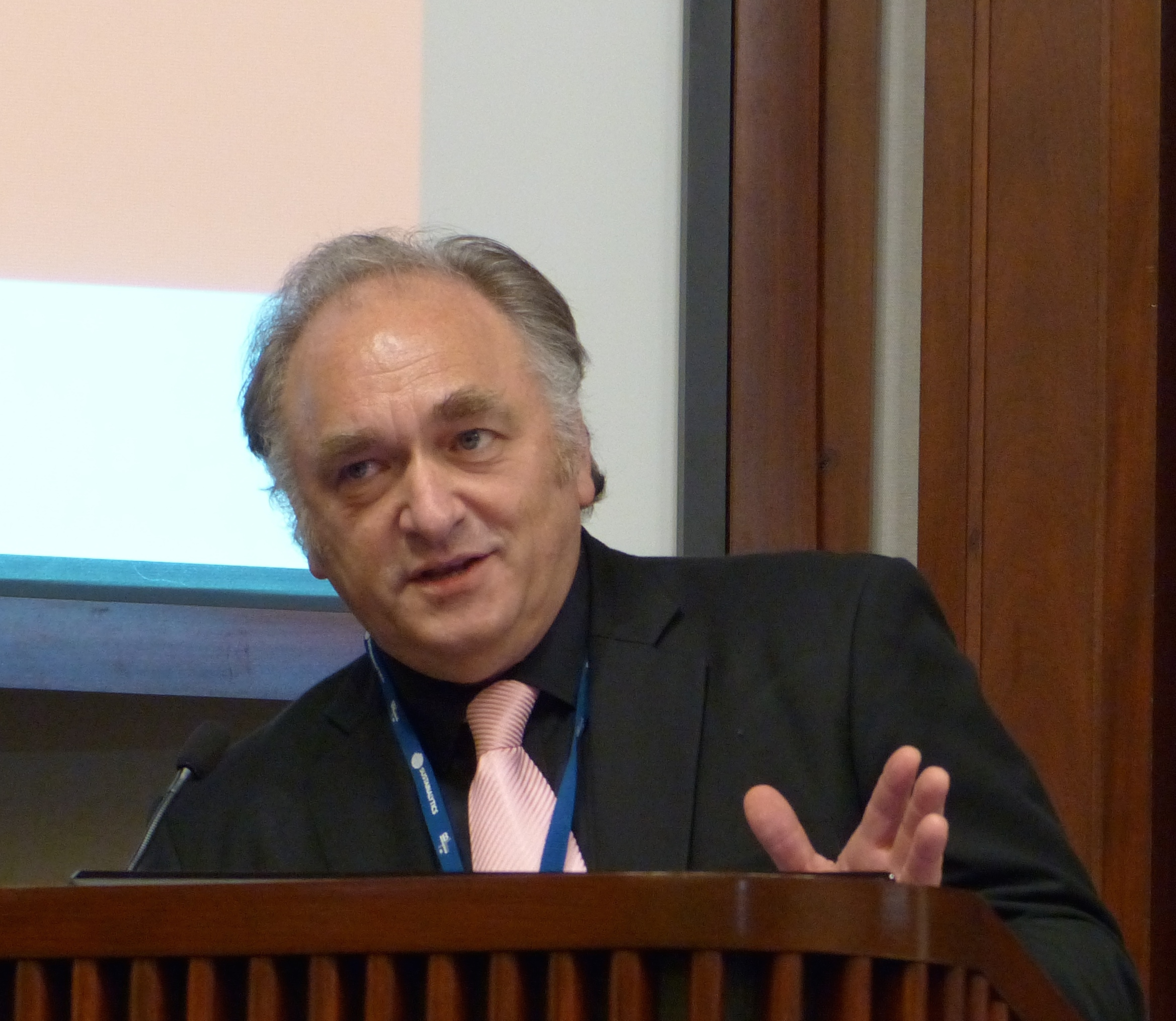
- Born: 9 February 1952 (age 74); Brooklyn, New York, United States
- Education: Brooklyn College New York
- Occupation: Social Entrepreneur
- Known for: Triple Bottom Line Investing
- Website: http://www.tbli.org

Robert J. Rubinstein (born 1952) is a social entrepreneur and the founder and driving force behind the TBLI (Triple Bottom Line Investing Group), a group that specializes in environmental, social and governance, ESG and impact investing, using triple bottom line principles.

== Early career ==
From 1974 to 1975 he worked on a kibbutz. From 1975 to 1978 he then worked for CIFAIR, a subsidiary of the Schlumberger oil exploration company, on oil rigs in France Iran and Texas. He also worked on Pillow Furniture in Amsterdam, following his father's footsteps as a tailor in working behind a sewing machine. He then worked for Third Wave Carriers and Creative handbook Europe before working between 1981 and 1998 as publishing editor of five Dutch magazines including Fiets Menu, and Source (the first European corporate social responsibility magazine).

== Work for TBLI ==
He founded and is the creative thought leader behind TBLI in 1998 in Amsterdam. The work has expanded and now includes organizing TBLI Conference, the world's leading International Conference on Responsible investment, advising the European Commission (DG Social and Employment), and running a consultancy firm. Robert lectured for the Rotterdam School of Management (RSM) after setting up their Sustainability program and still provides educational services through TBLI Academy.

He has been mentioned numerous times in the book, 'Partiality of Responsibility' (Ethics in Sustainability Consulting) written by Robert S. Earhart and published 2011.

In a 2019 interview with the Wealth and Society media platform, Rubenstein lamented the slow uptake in impact investments by the wealth management industry, "Private bankers seem to live in fear of their clients. They don’t lead their clients but follow them."

== Boards ==
- Member of the Advisory Board of Ethical Markets
- Member of the Advisory Board IMSA (International Sustainability Consultancy)
- Member of the Advisory Board BNP Paribas Investment Partners (ESG)
- Member of the Advisory Board Green Investment Forum
- Member of board ASN Foundation
