= Four Cornerstone Model of Emotional Intelligence =

Emotional model that focuses on knowledge, practical application and exploration

The Four Cornerstone Model of Emotional Intelligence is based on emotional literacy, emotional fitness, emotional depth, and emotional alchemy. The model moves emotional intelligence out of the realm of psychological analysis and philosophical theories and instead focuses on knowledge, exploration and practical application.

== Concept ==
The Four cornerstone model was developed by Ayman Sawaf and Robert Cooper in 1997. Multiple studies and research carried out in regards to emotional intelligence based on this model revealed a marginal qualitative difference between the public and private sector executives and expand on the usage of this model. The concept focuses on the fact that creative involvement in a stimulating job, opportunity, or an exciting discussion results in an increase in alertness, emotional energy, and performance. Repetitive and boring tasks on the other hand put the performer in danger of dismay, lack of efficiency and making mistakes. This generates its explanation from the fact that professionalism is based on self-discipline, inner guidance and emotional drive.

== The Four Factors ==
The four cornerstone model is mixed model of emotional intelligence based on four factors labeled as cornerstones:

1. Emotional literacy – the ability to identify, respect, and express feelings appropriately. This may include practical intuition, emotional honesty, emotional energy and emotional feedback.
2. Emotional fitness – consists of trust, resilience, authenticity and renewal.
3. Emotional depth – involves applying integrity and core values in influencing others without manipulation or control.
4. Emotional alchemy – blending and tuning emotions to find opportunities and realization of such opportunities by creativity, cognitive thinking and rhetoric.
