= Social venture =

A social venture (also called a social enterprise) is undertaking by a firm or organization established by a social entrepreneur that seeks to provide systemic solutions to achieve a sustainable, social objective.

== Background ==
Social ventures may be structured in many forms, including sole proprietorships, For-profit corporations, nonprofit organizations, non-governmental organizations, youth groups, community organizations, and more. Typically, government organizations are not considered to be social ventures, yet even government organizations can adopt entrepreneurial practices, possibly partnering with independent organizations, to explore the innovative methods for providing social services. Elkington and Hartigan define three models for social ventures: leveraged nonprofit, hybrid nonprofit, and social business. In the leveraged nonprofit venture the entrepreneur uses external partners for financial support in providing a public good. On the other hand, the hybrid nonprofit venture recovers a portion of its costs through sales of its goods or services. The social business venture generates profits, but rather than return those profits to shareholders, like commercial ventures, it reinvests those profits to further the social venture and the resulting social benefits.

The distinguishing characteristic of the social venture versus the commercial venture is the primacy of their objective to solve social problems and provide social benefits. The social venture may generate profits, but that is not its focus. Rather profits are a possible means to achieve sustainability in providing a social benefit. The problems addressed by social ventures cover the range of social issues, including poverty, inequality, education, the environment, and economic development. The context in which social ventures operate is very complex as they are trying to bring about solutions where markets or governments may have failed or actually impede solutions. Further, these ventures are trying to provide solutions where money is usually in short supply—often these ventures have little assurance that their services can be paid for by those they seek to serve. These conditions necessitate that the social entrepreneur to be creative, adaptable, and determined in finding new solutions to problems.
