= Bill Drayton =

American social entrepreneur

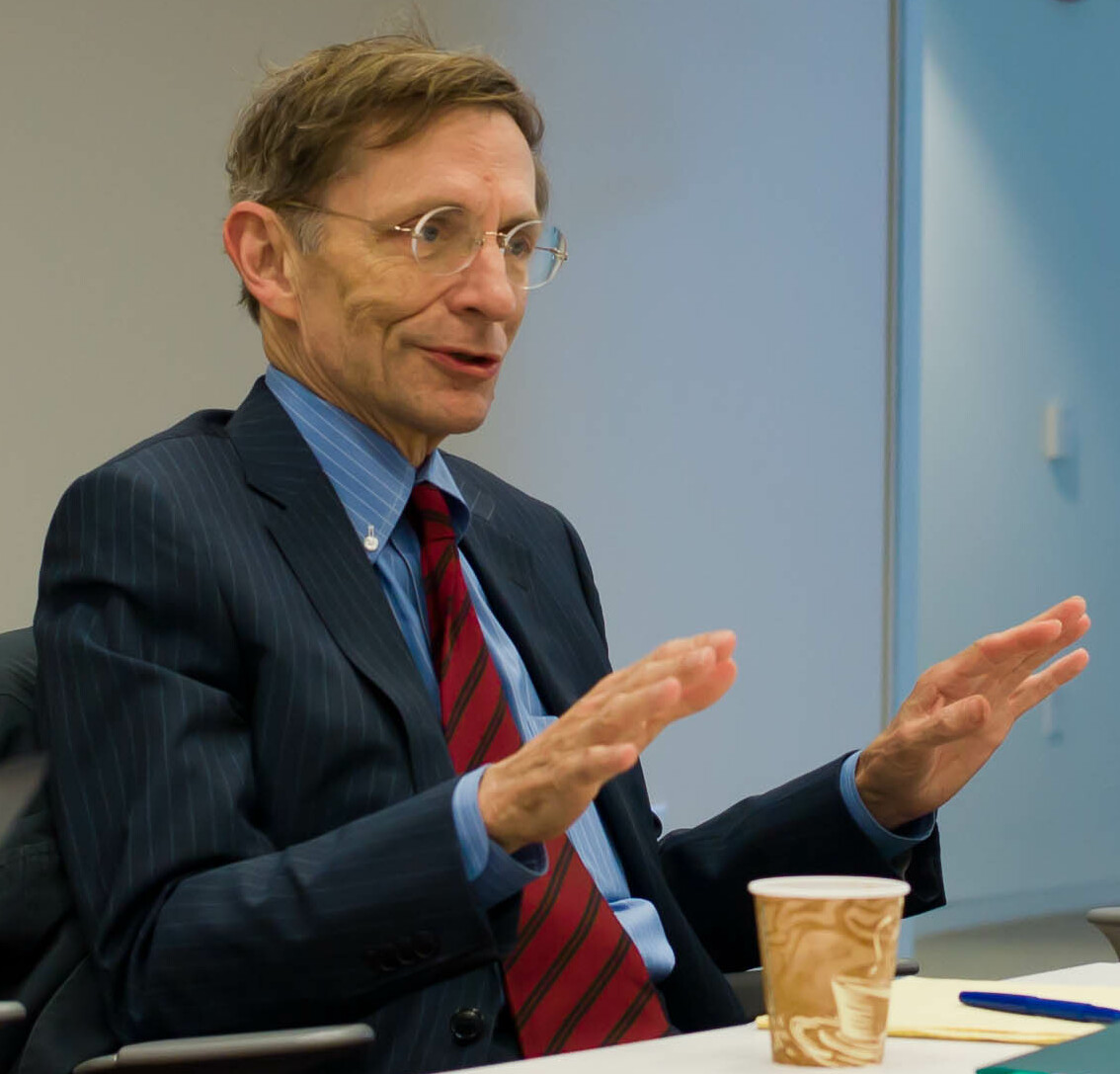
- Bill Drayton (2012)
- Born: William Drayton; 1943 (age 82–83); New York City, U.S.
- Education: Harvard University (BA); Balliol College, Oxford (MA); Yale University (JD)
- Occupation: Social entrepreneur
- Organization: Ashoka: Innovators for the Public
- Title: Chair and CEO

William "Bill" Drayton (born 1943) is an American social entrepreneur. Drayton was named by U.S. News & World Report as one of America's 25 Best Leaders in 2005. He helped popularize the term "social entrepreneur", a term used by J. A. Banks in 1972.

Drayton is the founder, chair and CEO of Ashoka: Innovators for the Public, a 501(c)(3) organization that supports social entrepreneurs worldwide. Drayton also chairs Youth Venture and Get America Working!

According to Ashoka, social entrepreneurs are individuals with innovative solutions to society's most pressing social problems. To quote Drayton, "Social entrepreneurs are not content just to give a fish or teach how to fish. They will not rest until they have revolutionized the fishing industry."

He was elected a member of the American Philosophical Society in 2019.

In 1980, Drayton founded Ashoka: Innovators for the Public. The organization elected its first fellows in India in 1981. He used the stipend from his 1984 MacArthur Fellowship to work full-time at Ashoka.

== Early life and education ==
Drayton's mother emigrated to the United States from Australia. His father was an American who became an explorer. Drayton was born in 1943 in New York City.

Drayton attended high school at Phillips Academy, where he established the Asia Society, which soon became the school's most popular student organization. He attended Harvard where he received his Bachelor of Arts degree in 1965. There he created the Ashoka Table, bringing in prominent government, union, and church leaders for off-the-record dinners at which students could ask "how things really worked". Drayton entered Balliol College, Oxford and received a Master of Arts degree in 1967. He attended Yale Law School where he received his Juris Doctor in 1970. At Yale Law School, Drayton founded Yale Legislative Services, which, at its peak, involved a third of the law school's student body.

== Career ==
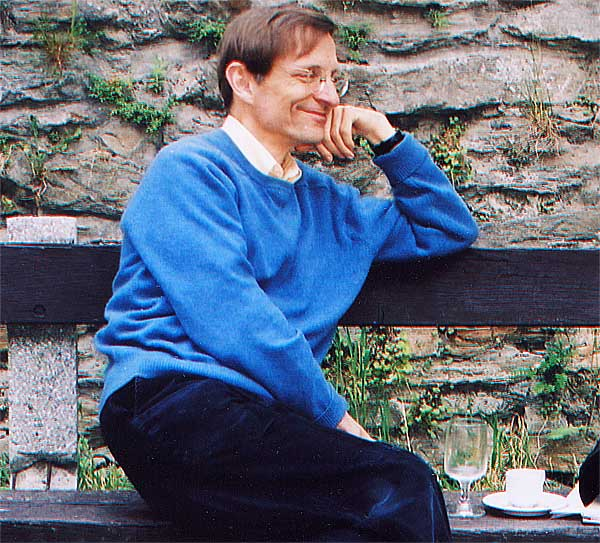
Bill Drayton

Drayton became a manager and management consultant, working for McKinsey & Company as a consultant for ten years.

During the administration of President Jimmy Carter (1977–1981), Drayton was an assistant administrator of the Environmental Protection Agency, where he helped introduce emissions trading, among other reforms. He founded the group Save EPA after he left.

Drayton has served as a visiting professor at Harvard University and Stanford University.

== Awards ==
Drayton was named one of the 1984 MacArthur Fellows for his work, including the founding of Ashoka: Innovators for the Public.

The American Society for Public Administration and the National Academy of Public Administration jointly awarded him their National Public Service Award. He has also been named a Preiskel–Silverman Fellow at Yale Law School. He is a member of the American Academy of Arts and Sciences.

On May 25, 2009, Drayton was awarded an honorary degree, Doctor of Humane Letters, by Yale University at commencement.

David Gergen has called Drayton the "godfather of social entrepreneurship." In 2008, Drayton was named a "visionary" as one of Utne Reader magazine's "50 Visionaries Who Are Changing Your World".

In 2011, Drayton won Spain's Prince of Asturias Award for international cooperation for his work promoting entrepreneurs. The prize foundation described him as a "driving force behind the figure of social entrepreneurs, men and women who undertake innovative initiatives for the common good".

Later in 2011, Drayton also accepted the John W. Gardner Leadership Award and the World Entrepreneurship Forum's Social Entrepreneur Award.

In 2012, Drayton was named an inaugural recipient of Middlebury College's Center for Social Entrepreneurship Vision Award.
