= Life-cycle cost analysis =

Economic term

Life-cycle cost analysis (LCCA) is an economic analysis tool to determine the most cost-effective option to purchase, run, sustain or dispose of an object or process. The method is popular in helping managers determine economic sustainability by figuring out the life cycle of a product or process.

== Definition ==
The term differs slightly from Total cost of ownership analysis (TCOA). LCCA determines the most cost-effective option to purchase, run, sustain or dispose of an object or process, and TCOA is used by managers or buyers to analyze and determine the direct and indirect cost of an item.

The term is used in the study of Industrial ecology (IE). The purpose of IE is to help managers make informed decisions by tracking and analyzing products, resources and wastes.

=== Green Design and Building Economics ===
In Green design managers add their operating costs and capital to help decide the effect of an investment. The method also allows managers to determine if more investments may be needed for green buildings.

== See also ==
- Cost–benefit analysis
- Invitation to negotiate
- Request for proposal
