= Louise Piper =

British nonprofit director

Louise Piper is the founding director of the UK-based non-profit Haller (formerly known as The Haller Foundation). Piper grew up in Africa, where her father worked for 35 years. After graduating with a law degree from the University of Cambridge, Piper spent nearly 20 years working in the financial markets in London, New York and the Far East for JP Morgan.

As a former colleague of Guido Haller, she visited Kenya to see the work of Dr Rene Haller. While in Kenya, Piper was inspired by the potential of Haller's work. She saw his work as a blueprint for rehabilitation across Sub-Saharan Africa. Piper then set up the Haller Foundation to raise funds to promote Haller’s principles and support his ideas. Louise Piper is a board member of The Baobab Trust, a Kenyan registered non-profit organization run by Haller. Piper is also the Chair of Trustees for End of Life Doula UK, the membership association for end of life doulas, also known as death doulas in the UK.
