= The New Green Consumer Guide =

2007 book by Julia Hailes

- Author: Julia Hailes
- Publisher: Simon & Schuster
- Publication date: May 21, 2007
- ISBN: 978-0-7432-9530-7
- OCLC: 81453131
- Preceded by: The Green Consumer Guide

The New Green Consumer Guide is a book written by Julia Hailes on green consumerism. The guide explores how one can consume goods and services in an environmentally friendly manner. Topics discussed include travel, transport, food and drink, home and garden, fashion and cosmetics.

The New Green Consumer Guide was published in 2007 as a successor to The Green Consumer Guide, which Hailes co-authored. First published in 1988, The Green Consumer Guide, in its various editions, has sold in excess of one million copies globally. In the first few weeks after it had been published, there were eleven print runs for The Green Consumer Guide.
