= Double bottom line =

Balancing profit with social impact

Double bottom line (abbreviated as DBL or 2BL) seeks to extend the conventional bottom line, which measures fiscal performance—financial profit or loss—by adding a second bottom line to measure a for-profit business's performance in terms of positive social impact. There is controversy about how to measure the double bottom line, especially since the use of the term "bottom line" implies some form of quantification. A 2004 report by the Center for Responsible Business (University of California, Berkeley) noted that while there are "generally accepted principles of accounting" for financial returns, "A comparable standard for social impact accounting does not yet exist." Social return on investment has been suggested as a way to quantify the second bottom line, though defining and measuring social impact can prove elusive.

The idea that for-profit corporations have an obligation to support social causes beyond their immediate interest in short-term profits dates back at least to the corporate social responsibility movement that can be traced to the 1960s.

The idea that upholding social responsibilities can help a company sustain its profits in the long term has been "part of mainstream management theory at least since the publication of Edward Freeman's 1984 classic, Strategic Management: A Stakeholder Approach", according to an article by Wayne Norman and Chris MacDonald in 2004. An early reference to the term itself came in Emerson and Twersky's 1996 book New Social Entrepreneurs: The Success, Challenge, and Lessons of Non-profit Enterprise Creation.

One example of a double bottom line enterprise is the Khushhali Bank's microfinance program in Pakistan. While the bank wants to generate profits so that it can grow, it has a second bottom line of reducing local poverty. Its 2004 annual report provides "audited financial statements and indicators of financial performance such as the bank’s credit rating, portfolio at risk and efficiency ratio" but also notes that the bank was "established to mobilize funds for providing micro-finance services to poor persons, particularly poor women for mitigating poverty and promoting social welfare and economic justice..." For an example of a double bottom line in the public sector, California State Treasurer Philip Angelides in 2000 called on state programs "to create economic growth and development in California's communities" by investing in them.

Some cite for-profit corporations contributing money or labor to charities and social causes. A 2006 article on corporate branding points to Nike's support of the "NikeGO" program to encourage and enable physical activity by children, and "Zoneparcs" "to transform playtime at UK primary schools." It also refers to Ben & Jerry's "splitting the traditional financial bottom line into a 'double' bottom line, which included a measurement of the environmental impact of their products and processes." The double bottom line is important for the growth of the firm as evidence suggests that CSR voluntarily taken on by companies will result in opportunities for further profit while creating social welfare.

== See also ==
- Triple bottom line, a UN standardized term
- Integrated bottom line, an attempt to combine the parameters from the triple bottom line as a single parameter (links to Triple bottom line).
