= Pamela Hartigan =

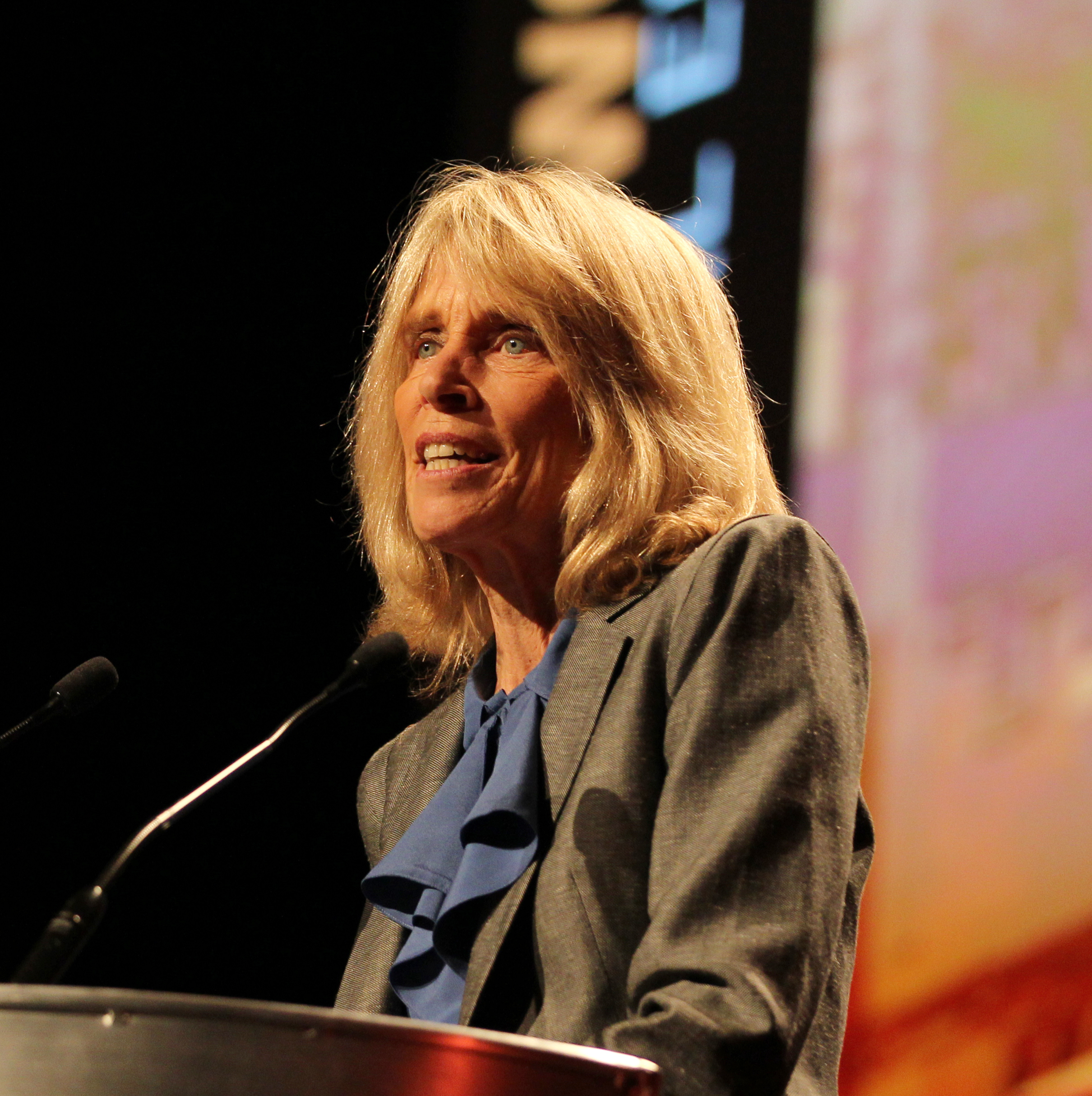
- Born: April 26, 1948
- Died: August 12, 2016 (aged 68)
- Occupations: Social entrepreneur, nonprofit executive

Pamela Hartigan (April 26, 1948 – August 12, 2016) was the Director of the Skoll Centre for Social Entrepreneurship at Saïd Business School, University of Oxford. She was the founding partner of Volans Ventures, and served as a director of the global non-profit social enterprise Cambia from 2009 until her death.

== Education ==
Hartigan obtained undergraduate and graduate degrees in international economics from Georgetown University's School of Foreign Service and the Institut d'Etudes Européennes in Brussels. She held a master's degree in education from American University and a Ph.D. in human developmental psychology from The Catholic University of America.

== Career ==
Hartigan spent over a decade supporting community-based organizations and working with youth in Washington, D.C. She has served as director of several programs and departments for the World Health Organization, including the Women, Health, and Development Program, the Department of Health Promotion, and the Department for Violence and Injury Prevention.

In October 2000, Hartigan became the first managing director of the Schwab Foundation for Social Entrepreneurship.

In 2008, Hartigan co-authored the book The Power of Unreasonable People: How Social Entrepreneurs Create Markets That Change the World.
