= Villgro =

Villgro, formerly known as Rural Innovations Network, is a social enterprise incubator.

Villgro funds, mentors and incubates early-stage, innovation-based social enterprises that impact the lives of India's poor. Since 2001, it has incubated 119 such enterprises, which have secured INR 1195 million in follow-on funding, and affected over 15 million lives.
