= Ashoka (non-profit organization) =

American nonprofit organization

- Named after: Emperor Ashoka
- Formation: June 3, 1980; 46 years ago
- Founder: Bill Drayton
- Tax ID no.: 51-0255908
- Legal status: 501(c)(3) nonprofit organization
- Headquarters: Arlington, Virginia, United States
- Location(s): Sub-Saharan Africa, Asia, North America, South America, Europe, Middle East/North Africa
- Coordinates: 38.8956482°N 77.0718925°W
- Chair, Chief Executive Officer: Bill Drayton
- Leadership Team member: Anamaria Schindler
- President emerita: Diana Wells
- Board of directors: Bill Drayton, Sushmita Ghosh, Mary Gordon, Roger Harrison, Fred Hehuwat
- Subsidiaries: List of subsidiaries Ashoka LLC _{(U.S.)}, Ashoka Canada _{Toronto}, Ashoka Chile _{Santiago}, Ashoka Conosur Este _{(Buenos Aires)}, Ashoka East Africa _{(Nairobi)}, Ashoka Deutschland _{Munich}, Ashoka India _{(Bangalore)}, Ashoka Indonesia _{Bandung}, Ashoka Italia _{Roma}, Ashoka Japan _{(Tokyo)}, Ashoka Korea _{(Seoul)}, Ashoka Emprendedores Sociales Asociacion Civil _{(Mexico City)}, Ashoka Netherlands _{(The Hague)}, Ashoka Philippines _{(Pasig City)}, Ashoka Poland _{(Warsaw)}, Ashoka Singapore and Malaysia _{(Singapore)}, Fundacion Ashoka Emprendedores Sociales _{(Madrid)}, Ashoka Scandinavia _{(Stockholm)}, Fondation Ashoka Suisse _{(Geneva)}, Ashoka Southern Africa _{(Johannesburg)}, Ashoka Thailand _{(Bangkok)}, Ashoka Turkiye _{(Istanbul)}, Ashoka UK & Ireland _{(London)}, Ashoka Venezuela _{(Caracas)}, Asociacion Ashoka Colombia _{(Bogota)}, Fundatia Ashoka _{(Bucharest)}, Ashoka Israel _{(Tel Aviv)}, Ashoka Arab World _{(Cairo)},
- Revenue: $42.1 million (2024)
- Expenses: $48.9 million (2024)
- Endowment: $36,437,514 _{(2021)}
- Employees: 107 (in U.S.) (2024)
- Volunteers: 2,300 (2024)
- Website: www.ashoka.org

Ashoka (also known as Ashoka: Innovators for the Public) is a U.S.-based 501(c)(3) nonprofit organization that promotes social entrepreneurship by connecting and supporting individual social entrepreneurs. In 2024, Ashoka supported over 3,800 social entrepreneurs in over 90 countries worldwide. By 2025, its network included over 4,000 social entrepreneurs.

Ashoka also offers social entrepreneurship opportunities to young people through its Young Changemakers program. Its Changemakers initiative used online idea competitions to solicit and discuss solutions to social problems. A 2011 study of 47 projects associated more contributions with project visibility, specified skills and required outcome measures.

A 2025 Ashoka brochure published on the INREM Foundation website states that 650 million people per year are reached by the work of Ashoka Fellows. In 2019, Forbes contributor Lilach Bullock included Ashoka in a list of five innovative social enterprises.

== History ==
Bill Drayton founded Ashoka in 1980.

The organization was named after the Emperor Ashoka the Great, the ruler of the Maurya Empire during the 3rd century BC. Emperor Ashoka recognized the suffering he had caused by unifying his empire, and he promoted religious and philosophical tolerance and the paramount importance of morality in public service.

== Fellows ==
Ashoka selects social entrepreneurs whose projects address social problems. The organization says it seeks candidates with new ideas and a focus on public benefit.

Social entrepreneurs who pass the selection process are called Ashoka Fellows. Depending on need, Ashoka fellows may receive a financial stipend that they can use to pay for their personal expenses so that they can work full-time on their projects. The size of the stipend is decided on a case-by-case basis, according to the cost of living in the entrepreneur's local area. The stipend is available for up to three years. The stipend is only for living expenses and not for funding the social entrepreneur's initiative or organization.

Ashoka connects Fellows with entrepreneurs to support their projects. Ashoka Fellows are expected to regularly participate in meetings with other Ashoka Fellows. Ultimately, the Ashoka fellow is expected to convert an innovative solution into a self-sustaining institution.

Ashoka funds the stipends by raising funds from donors, which it uses as venture capital.

Of Ashoka Fellows with ventures that were more than five years old, Ashoka reported in 2007 that more than 80% had had their solution implemented by others; 59% had directly affected national policy; and each Ashoka fellow was helping an average of 174,000 people.

== Organizational policies ==
According to the organization, it does not accept funding from any government, although it has partnered with governments on projects and it received a $1,585,600 Paycheck Protection Program loan in 2020.

While Ashoka says it does not petition governments for social change, it provides advice to organizations such as the World Bank when requested.

== Citizen-sector organization ==
While the United States Internal Revenue Service has approved Ashoka's headquarters as a 501(c)(3) nonprofit organization, and some countries consider Ashoka to be a non-governmental organization, Ashoka itself prefers the term citizen-sector organization in order to emphasize what it is, rather than what it is not. According to Ashoka, citizen-sector organizations are groups of citizens working on social issues.
