= John Elkington (business author) =

British author, advisor and serial entrepreneur (born 1949)

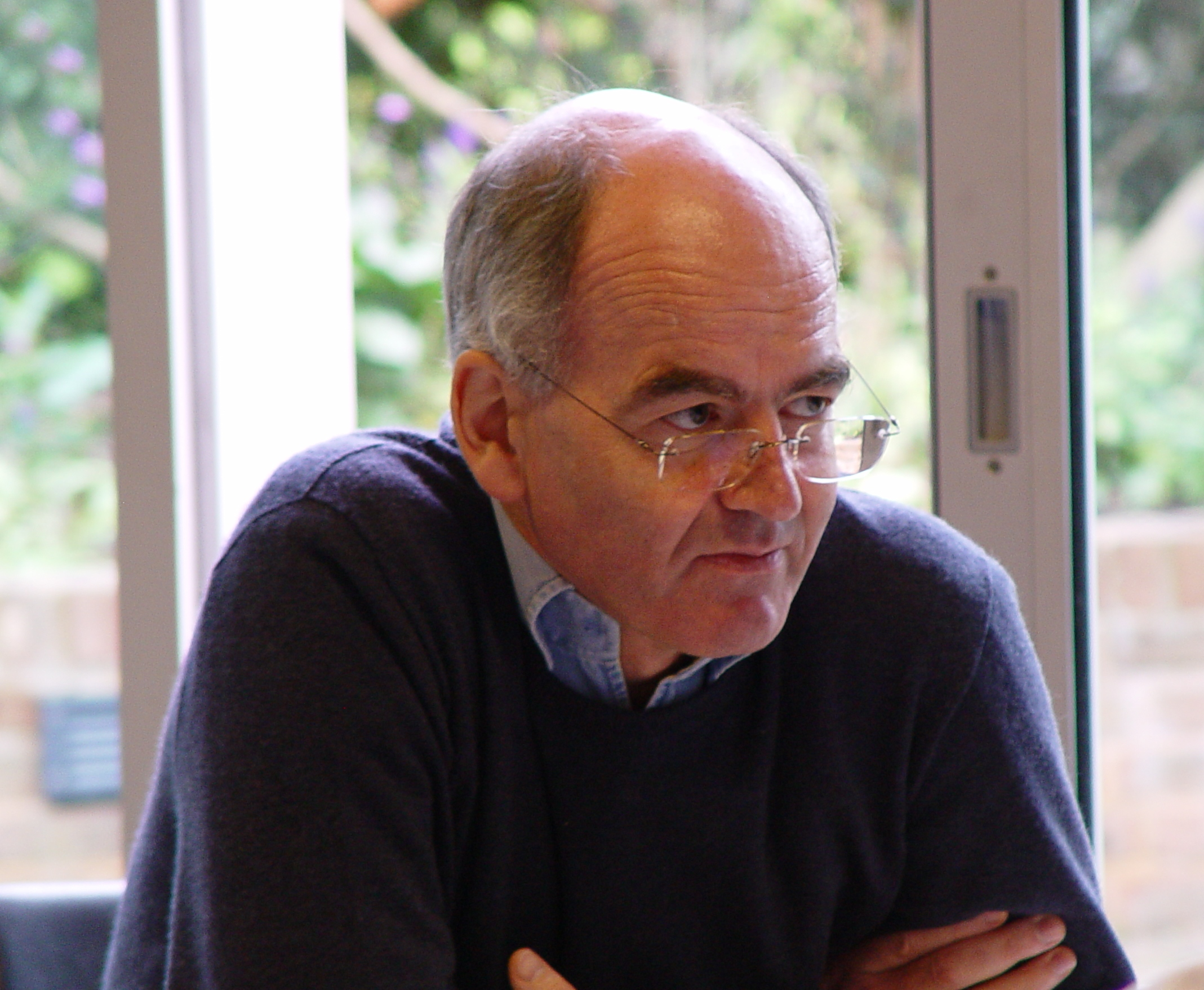
- Born: John Brett Elkington; 23 June 1949 (age 77); Padworth, Berkshire, England, United Kingdom
- Citizenship: British
- Education: University College London
- Known for: Triple Bottom Line
- Awards: 2011 Spencer Hutchens, Jr. Medal by the American Society for Quality (ASQ)
- Scientific career
- Fields: Sustainability; Innovation; Social entrepreneurship Environmentalism; Ecology
- Workplaces: Volans
- Website: https://johnelkington.com/

John Elkington CF (born 23 June 1949) is an author, advisor and serial entrepreneur. He is an authority on corporate responsibility and sustainable development. He has written and co-authored 20 books, including the Green Consumer Guide, Cannibals with Forks: The Triple Bottom Line of 21st Century Business, The Power of Unreasonable People: How Social Entrepreneurs Create Markets That Change the World, and The Breakthrough Challenge: 10 Ways to Connect Tomorrow's Profits with Tomorrow's Bottom Line.

He is a founding partner and chairman & chief pollinator at Volans; co-founder and honorary chairman of SustainAbility; honorary chairman of Environmental Data Services (ENDS, 1978); senior advisor to the Business & Human Rights Resource Centre; member of the World Wildlife Fund (WWF) Council of Ambassadors; visiting professor at Cranfield University School of Management, Imperial College and University College London (UCL). He is a member of over 20 boards and advisory boards.

He coined the terms environmental excellence, green growth, green consumer, the triple bottom line and People, Planet & Profit.

== Early life ==
Elkington was born in 1949 on an island in a tributary of the Thames.

== Career ==
He wrote his first book with Julia Hailes, the Green Consumer Guide, in 1980, at the age of 31.

At the age of 28, Elkington co-founded Environmental Data Services (ENDS) with David Layton and Max Nicholson. In 1983, SustainAbility was established as a think tank consultancy that works with businesses through markets in the pursuit of economic, social and environmental sustainability. The company was launched as John Elkington Associates but renamed SustainAbility in 1987.

From 2002 to 2008, Elkington was a faculty member of the World Economic Forum.

In 2008, he co-founded Volans Ventures with Pamela Hartigan, Sam Lakha, Geoff Lye, and Kevin Teo.

Elkington was described by Business Week in 2004 as "a dean of the corporate responsibility movement for three decades." In 2008, the Evening Standard had named him among the '1000 Most Influential People' in London, describing him as "a true green business guru", and as "an evangelist for corporate social and environmental responsibility long before it was fashionable".

== Awards ==
He has received awards from the United Nations, Fast Company, the American Society for Quality, the Rockefeller Foundation and the Skoll Foundation. In 1981, he was awarded the Winston Churchill Memorial Fellowship, UK. In 2009, a CSR International survey of the Top 100 CSR leaders placed Elkington fourth after Al Gore, Barack Obama and the late Anita Roddick of the Body Shop, and alongside Muhammad Yunus of the Grameen Bank. In 2014, he was awarded an honorary doctorate by the University of Essex.

== Selected publications ==
- "The Breakthrough Challenge: 10 Ways to Connect Today's Profits With Tomorrow's Bottom Line," by John Elkington and Jochen Zeitz (Authors), with a foreword by Sir Richard Branson (hardcover, Jossey-Bass, 2014)
- "The Zeronauts: Breaking the Sustainability Barrier," by John Elkington (hardcover, Routledge/Taylor & Francis, 2012)
- The Power of Unreasonable People: How Social Entrepreneurs Create Markets That Change the World by John Elkington and Pamela Hartigan (Authors), Klaus Schwab (Foreword), (hardcover, Harvard Business School Press, 2008)
- The Chrysalis Economy: How Citizen CEOs and Corporations Can Fuse Values and Value Creation, by John Elkington (hardcover, Capstone/John Wiley, 2001)
- Manual 2000 by John Elkington and Julia Hailes (paperback, 1998)
- Cannibals with Forks: The Triple Bottom Line of 21st Century Business by John Elkington (Capstone/John Wiley, hardcover, 1997)
- The Green Consumer: Revised Edition by Joel Makower, John Elkington, and Julia Hailes (paperback, Tilden Press, 1993)
- Holidays That Don't Cost the Earth by John Elkington and Julia Hailes (Gollancz, paperback, 1992)
- The Green Business Guide by John Elkington and Peter Knight (Victor Gollancz, 1991)
- The Green Consumer Supermarket Shopping Guide by John Elkington, and Julia Hailes (Gollancz, paperback, 1991)
- A Year in the Greenhouse: An Environmental Diary by John Elkington (Gollancz, hardcover, 1990)
- The Young Green Consumer's Guide by John Elkington, Julia Hailes, Douglas Hill, and Tony Ross (Gollancz, paperback, 1990)
- The Green Consumer Guide: From Shampoo to Champagne: High-Street Shopping for a Better Environment by John Elkington & Julia Hailes (Gollancz, paperback, 1988)
- Green Pages by John Elkington, Tom Burke, and Julia Hailes (Routledge, paperback, 1988)
- The Green Capitalists: Industry's Search for Environmental Excellence by John Elkington with Tom Burke (Gollancz, hardcover, 1987)
- The Poisoned Womb: Human Reproduction in a Polluted World (Viking, hardback 1986, Pelican, paperback, 1987)
- The Gene Factory: Inside the Genetic and Biotechnology Business Revolution (Century, hardcover, 1985)
- Sun Traps: The Renewable Energy Forecast (Pelican, paperback, 1984)
- The Ecology of Tomorrow's World (Associated Business Press, hardcover, 1980)

Selected chapters/essays in other books:

- Military for Sustainability, Glimpse 7–4, by John Elkington, pp 185–189 in Jørgen Randers, 2052: A Global Forecast for the Next Forty Years, a report to the Club of Rome, Chelsea Green Publishing, 2012
- The Phoenix Economy: Agenda for a Sustainable Future, by John Elkington, in The World That Changes the World: How Philanthropy, Innovation and Entrepreneurship are Transforming the Social Ecosystem, edited by Willie Cheng and Sharifah Mohamed, Jossey-Bass/Wiley, hardback, 2010
- Is It Possible to Sustain Asia?, by John Elkington and Jodie Thorpe, in Asia: Changing the World, edited by Liz Mohn and Wolfgang Schüssel, Verlag Bertelsmann Stiftung, 2007
- From Corporate Responsibility to Good Governance and Scalable Solutions, by Seb Beloe, John Elkington and Jodie Thorpe, in Corporate Social Responsibility: Reconciling Aspiration with Application, edited by Andrew Kakabadse and Mette Morsing, Palgrave Macmillan, hardback, 2006
- Can Business Help Governments Change the System?, by Seb Beloe, John Elkington and Jodie Thorpe, in The Accountable Corporation, Volume 4: Business-Government Relations, edited by Marc J. Epstein and Kirk O. Hanson, Praeger Publishers, hardback, 2006
- This River Runs Through Me, by John Elkington, pp 151–153 in Bryanston Reflections: Et Nova Et Vetera, Third Millennium Publishing, hardback, 2005
- Globalization's Reality Check, by John Elkington in David Held et al., Debating Globalization, Polity Press, paperback, 2005
- Enter the Triple Bottom Line, by John Elkington, in The Triple Bottom Line: Does It All Add Up?, edited by Adrian Henriques and Julie Richardson, Earthscan, paperback, 2004
- Social and Environmental Reporting, by John Elkington, in Governance and Risk: An Analytical Handbook for Investors, Managers, Directors & Stakeholders, by George Dallas, McGraw-Hill, hardback, 2004
- Economy, by John Elkington, pp 203–233 in Our World in Focus: Moving Toward a Sustainable Future, Earth Pledge Foundation and Magnum, hardback, 2003
- London & The Thames, by John Elkington, pp 152–157, in The English Landscape, with an introduction by Bill Bryson, Profile Books, hardback, 2000
- Poisons to Burn or Bury: Environment Special Report, by John Elkington, pp 364–365, Encyclopædia Britannica, 1984 Book of the Year

Selected reports - over 50 authored or co-authored reports published to date, including:

- The Stretch Agenda: Breakthrough in the Boardroom, Volans and the Generation Foundation, paperback 2015
- Interface: The Untold Story of Mission Zero, Volans and Interface, paperback 2014
- Investing in Breakthrough: Corporate Venture Capital, with Charmian Love and Amanda Feldman, Volans with Global Corporate Venturing, the John D. and Catherine T. MacArthur Foundation and Social Investment Business, paperback 2014
- Breakthrough: Business Leaders, Market Revolutions, Volans, paperback 2013
- The Future Quotient: 50 Stars in Seriously Long-Term Innovation, Volans and JWT Ethos, paperback 2011
- The Transparent Economy: Six Tigers Stalk the Global Recovery--and How to Tame Them, Volans for the Global Reporting Initiative, paperback 2010
- The Phoenix Economy: 50 Pioneers in the Business of Social Innovation, Volans for the Skoll Foundation, paperback 2009
- The Biosphere Economy: Natural Limits Can Spur Creativity, Innovation and Growth, Alejandro Litovsky and John Elkington, Volans with Tellus Mater and Business for the Environment (B4E), paperback 2010
- For reports from the SustainAbility years, see here
- Cleaning Up: US Waste Management Technology and Third World Development (World Resources Institute Papers,) by John Elkington and Jonathan Shopley (World Resources Institute, paperback, 1989)
- Thailand: Natural Resources Profile (Natural Resources of South-East Asia) by Anat Arbhabhirama, Dhira Phantumvanit, and John Elkington (hardcover, 1988)
- The Shrinking Planet: US Information Technology and Sustainable Development (WRI Paper, No 3) by John Elkington and Jonathan Shopley (1988)
- Double Dividends? US Biotechnology and Third World Development, WRI Paper, No 2 (paperback, November 1986)
- Bio-Japan: The emerging Japanese challenge in biotechnology (paperback, 1985)
