= Social innovation =

Practices aiming to meet social needs

Social innovation is the creation of new social practices to better meet social needs in areas such as working conditions, education, community development and health. The goal is to strengthen civil society. Social innovations include the social processes of innovation, such as open source methods, as well as innovations with social purpose. Examples of social innovation include activism, crowdfunding, time-based currency, telehealth, cohousing, coworking, universal basic income, collaborative consumption, social enterprise, participatory budgeting, repair Cafés, virtual volunteering, microcredit, and distance learning. Definitions of social innovation usually include social objectives, social interaction, social outputs, and innovativeness (the innovation is new to the beneficiaries, but not necessarily to the world). Transformative social innovation not only introduces new approaches to seemingly intractable problems, but is successful in changing the social institutions that created the problems in the first place.

Prominent innovators include Pakistani Akhter Hameed Khan and Bangladeshi Muhammad Yunus, the founder of Grameen Bank who pioneered the concept of microcredit for supporting innovations in many developing countries such as Asia, Africa and Latin America, and inspired programs like the Jindal Centre for Social Innovation & Entrepreneurship and Infolady Social Entrepreneurship Programme of Dnet.

== Definitions ==
Geoff Mulgan defines social innovation as consisting of "activities and services that are motivated by the goal of meeting a social need and that are predominantly developed and diffused through organizations whose primary purposes are social."

According to Herrero de Egaña, social innovation is defined as "new or novel ways that society has to deal with Relevant Social Challenges (RSCh), that are more effective, efficient and sustainable or that generate greater impact than the previous ones and that contribute to making it stronger and more articulated".

Social innovation is contrasted with business innovation, which aims to maximise profit. The European Commission cites it as "another way to produce value, with less focus on financial profit and more on real demands or needs." More specifically, it defines social innovation as comprising "innovations that are social in both their ends and their means. They are innovations that are not only good for society but also enhance individuals' capacity to act."

== Focus and application ==
Social innovation has an inter-sectoral approach and is universally applicable. Social innovations are launched by a variety of actors, including research institutions, companies and independent organizations, which tend to use their respective definitions of social innovation. Therefore, it is worth discussing what distinguishes it from other forms of social work or innovation.

Social innovation focuses on the process of innovation, how innovation and change take shape (as opposed to the more traditional definition of innovation, giving priority to the internal organization of firms and their productivity). It likewise centers on new work and new forms of cooperation (business models), especially on those that work towards the attainment of a sustainable society.

Social innovation can take place within government; the for-profit sector, the nonprofit sector (also known as the third sector), or in the spaces between them. Higher education institutions, such as the Cambridge Centre for Social Innovation, Cambridge Judge Business School, University of Cambridge, leverage the power of research to support this aim. Research has focused on the types of platforms needed to facilitate such cross-sector collaborative social innovation. Historical studies suggest that transforming any system may take many years, and requires not only the capacity for multiple partnerships, but also for engaging policy, legal and economic institutions.

Social entrepreneurship, like social enterprise, is typically in the nonprofit sector excluding both for-profit and public organizations. Both social entrepreneurship and social enterprise are important contributions to social innovation by creating social value and introducing new ways of achieving goals. Social entrepreneurship brings "new patterns and possibilities for innovation" and are willing to do things that existing organizations are not willing to do.

Social innovation success is often shaped by strategic alliances. Those startups motivated by a social mission can improve their business performance via equity and non-equity strategic alliances, to enhance growth and foster social innovation. However, sustainable growth requires to attract the right investments at the right stage of development of the startup. Cacciolatti et al. (2020) developed a framework based on international business theory to explain the mechanisms regulating strategic alliances and firm performance in the context of startups with a social mission.

Social innovation is often an effort of mental creativity which involves fluency and flexibility from a wide range of disciplines. The act of social innovation in a sector is mostly connected with diverse disciplines within the society. The social innovation theory of "connected difference" emphasizes three key dimensions to social innovation. First, innovations are usually new combinations or hybrids of existing elements, rather than completely new. Second, their practice involves cutting across organizational or disciplinary boundaries. Lastly, they leave behind compelling new relationships between previously separate individuals and groups. Social innovation is also gaining visibility within academia.

In the late nineteenth and early twentieth centuries, far-reaching investments in scientific research and community infrastructure laid the groundwork for many social and economic improvements in society. Despite the challenges of industrialisation, optimism about the power of technology to promote positive change created momentum for social innovation projects in healthcare, housing, sanitation, public infrastructure, communication, and transportation.

Since 2014, a subdomain of social innovation has been defined in relation to the introduction of digital technologies. The subdomain is called digital social innovation and refers to "a type of social and collaborative innovation in which innovators, users and communities collaborate using digital technologies to co-create knowledge and solutions for a wide range of social needs and at a scale and speed that was unimaginable before the rise of the Internet".

Notable examples of social enterprise-driven responses to human trafficking include Not For Sale, founded by David Batstone and Mark Wexler, which incubated REBBL, a plant-based beverage company sourcing ingredients from indigenous communities in Peru's Amazon rainforest; and Dignita, a self-sustaining restaurant in Amsterdam providing culinary training and employment to survivors of human trafficking.

== History ==
Social innovation was discussed in the writings of figures such as Peter Drucker and Michael Young (founder of the Open University and dozens of other organizations) in the 1960s. It also appeared in the work of French writers in the 1970s, such as Pierre Rosanvallon, Jacques Fournier, and Jacques Attali. However, the themes and concepts in social innovation existed long before. Benjamin Franklin, for example, talked about small modifications within the social organization of communities that could help to solve everyday problems. Many radical 19th century reformers like Robert Owen, founder of the cooperative movement, promoted innovation in the social field and all of the great sociologists including Karl Marx, Max Weber and Émile Durkheim focused attention on broader processes of social change. In recent years, the work of Gabriel Tarde on the concept of imitation has been rediscovered by social scientists in order to better understand social innovation and its relation to social change. Other theories of innovation became prominent in the 20th century, many of which had social implications, without putting social progress at the center of the theory. Joseph Schumpeter, for example, addressed the process of innovation directly with his theory of creative destruction and his definition of entrepreneurs as people who combined existing elements in new ways to create a new product or service. Beginning in the 1980s, writers on technological change increasingly addressed how social factors affect technology diffusion.

The article "Rediscovering Social Innovation" mentions how social innovations are dependent on history and the change in institutions. The article discusses the ten recent social innovations reflecting current change to include:

- Charter schools and other educational initiatives: Charter schools are a social innovation that provides an alternative avenue for students to continue to develop and build upon their educational foundation without many of the issues prominent in the public school system. These primary and secondary schools are publicly funded and operate independently, which allows the teachers and parents to collaboratively develop alternative teaching methods for their students as related regulations are less stringent for Charter Schools. Other educational initiatives include institutions such as the West Philadelphia Community Free School, operated by the School District of Philadelphia's experimental Office of Innovative Programs from 1969 to 1978.
- Community-centered planning: This social innovation allows communities to plan and develop systems that cater solutions to their specific local needs by using their historical knowledge and other local resources.
- Emissions trading: The Emissions Trading program was designed to address issues associated with the continuous increase in pollution. The program provides solutions such as setting a cap on the amount that certain pollutants can be emitted, and implementing a permit system to control the amount of pollution produced by each participating business. If a business needs to use more pollution than permitted, it can purchase credits from a business that has not emitted its maximum permitted amount. The goal of the Emissions Trading program is that, over time and with increased awareness, society will limit the types and the numbers of pollutants emitted to what is only necessary.
- Fair trade: Products including coffee, sugar, and chocolate are currently being traded without high standards that result in tough conditions for farmers and a less sustainable environment. Fair trade is a movement that certifies traders to exchange with the farmers that produce these products. The idea behind this movement is that by being paid a living-wage, being able to meet social and environmental standards and promoting "environmental sustainability, the lives of these farmers will be improved.
- Habitat conservation plans: Habitat Conservation Plans is an effort by the US Fish and Wild Life Service and the Environmental Protection Agency to protect species and their endangerment by providing economical incentives to conserve their habitats and protect these species from endangerment.
- Individual Development Accounts: This social innovation is made to support the working poor with saving decisions that they have made to better enhance their lives. This initiative will give $2 per every $1 saved by the working poor for College tuition, purchasing a home, starting a business, and other similar and productive initiatives. This is made possible by philanthropic, government and corporate sponsors that donate to this cause.
- International labor standards: Labor standards differ country-to-country, with some agreeably better than others. in an effort to internationally align these, the International Labor Organization, participating governments, and employees contributed to the development of standards that protect workers' rights to freedom, equity, security, and human dignity".
- Microfinance: This social innovation is created to support those financially unable to gain access to financial services such as banking, lending, and insurance. The ultimate goal of Microfinance is to enable an escape from poverty by helping to improve the living conditions and financial viability among the impoverished program participants.
- Socially responsible investing: "An investment strategy that attempts to maximize both financial and social returns. Investors generally favor businesses and other organizations whose practices support environmental sustainability, human rights, and consumer protection."
- Supported employment: Supported employment is a social innovation geared towards helping disabled or disadvantaged workers who are un- or under-employed due to their condition obtain suitable employment. The Support Employment service provides access to job coaches, transportation, assistive technology, specialized job training, and individual tailored supervision in an effort to help program participants become more competitive applicants and better prepared overall for the job market.

== Developments since 2000 ==
Academic research, blogs and websites feature social innovation, along with organizations working on the boundaries of research and practical action. Topics include:

- Innovation in public services was pioneered particularly in some Scandinavian and Asian countries. Governments are increasingly recognizing that innovation requires healthcare, schooling and democracy.
- Social entrepreneurship, which is the practice of creating new organizations focusing on non-market activities.
- Responsible Research and Innovation, which takes into account effects and potential impacts on the environment and society. It includes Engagement of all societal actors (researchers, industry, policymakers and civil society); Gender Equality; Science Education; Open Access; Ethics; and Governance.
- Online volunteering, a free service launched in 2000 whereby individuals from all over the world contribute to the needs of development organizations and public institutions.
- Open source innovation, in which the intellectual property involved in a product or service is made freely available.
- Complex adaptive systems, which have built-in mechanisms to help them adapt to changing circumstances.
- Collaborative approaches which involve stakeholders who are not directly responsible for some activity, such as stockholders and unions collaborating on business issue and business collaborating with government on regulatory issues.
- Innovation diffusion.
- Localized influences that make some localities particularly innovative.
- Institutional or system entrepreneurship which focuses on agents who work at a broad system level in order to create the conditions which will allow innovations to have a lasting impact.
- Business, particularly in services.
- Public health innovation and co-design of equity centered health.
- Social innovation in tourism development, which involve creation of innovative and appropriate development strategies to involve local communities as a key agent in the decision-making and planning of tourism destinations.

=== Institutional support ===
The United States created an Office for Social Innovation in the White House, which is funding projects that combine public and private resources. with foundations that support social innovation. In 2010, the US government listed 11 investments made by its 'Social Innovation Fund', with public funding more than matched by philanthropic organizations. This fund focuses on partnerships with charities, social enterprises, and business. Moreover, educational institutions are now increasingly supporting teaching and research in the area of social innovation. In addition to pioneered efforts by institutions such as the Harvard Business School's Initiative on Social Enterprise (launched 1993) and Said Business School's Skoll Centre for Social Entrepreneurship (launched 2003), INSEAD and other universities now offer short-term programs in Social Innovation, and a few such as Cambridge Centre for Social Innovation, Cambridge Judge Business School, University of Cambridge, and Goldsmiths, University of London offer Masters courses dedicated entirely to the study of theory and practice in relation to social entrepreneurship and innovation. The Cambridge Centre for Social Innovation's aim is to build best practices across business, civil society, policy and academia for a more equitable, inclusive and sustainable world.

Public policy makers support social innovation in the UK, Australia, China and Denmark, as well. The European Union's innovation strategy was the first well-funded research and development strategy to emphasize social innovation.

In 2002, the South Australian government, led by Premier and Social Inclusion Minister Mike Rann, embraced a ten-year social innovation strategy with big investments and a focus on reform in areas such as homelessness, school retention, mental health and disability services.

The Common Ground and Street to Home homelessness initiatives and the Australian Centre for Social Innovation were established in Adelaide and many reforms trialed in South Australia have been adopted nationally throughout Australia. This initiative, headed by Monsignor David Cappo, South Australia's Social Inclusion Commissioner, was advised by 'Thinkers in Residence' Geoff Mulgan and New York social entrepreneur Rosanne Haggerty.

== Role in curbing corruption ==
Lin and Chen, in "The Impact of Societal and Social innovation: a case-based approach" have argued that social innovation's goal is to produce actions that are "socially valuable and good for many".

In governance, its main role is to enhance and maximize the trust of citizens through active involvement in society, whether in the public or private sphere. Social innovation's role in curbing corruption is carried out through two main mediums. Firstly, it is institutionalized through actors (in the public and the private sectors), and secondly, it is executed with new tools available, specifically ICTs.

== Local and regional development ==
Literature on social innovation in relation to territorial/regional development covers innovation in the social economy, i.e. strategies for satisfaction of human needs; and innovation in the sense of transforming and/or sustaining social relations, especially governance relations at the regional and local level. Beginning in the late 1980s, Jean-Louis Laville and Frank Moulaert researched social innovation. In Canada CRISES initiated this type of research. Another, larger project was SINGOCOM a European Commission Framework 5 project, which pioneered so-called "Alternative Models for Local Innovation" (ALMOLIN). These models were further elaborated through community actions covered by KATARSIS and SOCIAL POLIS. More recent works focus on the societal role of the economic life in terms of innovations in social practices and social relations at the local and regional levels. Social Innovation, therefore, is increasingly seen as a process and a strategy to foster human development through solidarity, cooperation, and cultural diversity.

The EU funded URBACT programme is designed to help cities to exchange and learn around urban policies. The URBACT methodology can be seen as a social innovation action planning approach. A typical URBACT network would have ten cities working on a specific theme such as active inclusion or regenerating disadvantaged neighbourhoods. They examine good practice and then working through a local support group use the results to inform their local action plan.

The Social Innovation Europe initiative, funded by the European Commission's Directorate General for Enterprise and Industry, was set up to map social innovation at a European level, by creating a directory of grass-roots examples of social innovation from across the 27 member states.

The European Commission funded the SELUSI study between 2008 – 2013 that looked at over 550 social ventures and examined how these insights can spark change and innovation at a much larger scale. It looked at business models of social ventures in five countries – UK being one of them – identifying which specific practices evolved by social ventures are particularly successful, and how and by whom – be it social enterprise, public sector body or mainstream business – they can be most effectively scaled-up.

The European Commission has launched a new initiative (project) in 2013 under FP7 funding, with the aim to build a network of incubators for social innovation across regions and countries. This network facilitates identification of 300 social innovation examples and facilitates its scaling. The network is organised in a way to identify new models for scaling of social innovations across various geographical clusters in collaboration with each other, communicating the ideas, finding the tools and funds, developing business plans and models in order to promote the new promising ideas throughout Europe.

- A guide also exists that provides a way to promote social innovations at a local or regional level.

== Some noted scholars ==
- Akhtar Hameed Khan
- Frank Moulaert
- Geoff Mulgan
- Ted London
- Jürgen Howaldt
- Frances Westley

== See also ==
- Appropriate technology
- Civil society
- Online volunteering
- Post fordism
- Social capital
- Social entrepreneurship
- Social entrepreneurship in South Asia
- Sustainopreneurship
- Technological innovation

== References (books) ==
- Europe Tomorrow, (2015) "Europe tour of Social & Environmental innovation".
- Social innovation exchange, (2015) "worldwide social innovation exchange".
- Halvorson, M. J., Kurtz, S. C. (2024). This Little World: A How-To Guide for Social Innovators. Abingdon, UK, and New York: Routledge.
- Hubert A. (ed.) (2010). Empowering People, Driving Change: Social Innovation in the European Union. Brussels: BEPA – Bureau of European Policy Advisers.
- Kleinert S., Horton R. (2013). Health in Europe – Successes, Failures, and New Challenges. The Lancet, 381: 1073–1074.
- Mulgan G., Tucker S., Rushanara A., Sanders B. (2007). Social Innovation. What it is, why it matters and how it can be accelerated. London: The Young Foundation.
- Mulgan G. (2019) Social Innovation: how societies find the power to change, Bristol, Policy Press
- Murray R., Caulier-Grice J., Mulgan G. (2010). The Open Book of Social Innovation. London: The Young Foundation and Nesta.
- Stott, N.; Fava, M.; Slawinski, N. (2019). "Community social innovation: taking a long view on community enterprise". In George, G.; Baker, T.; Tracey, P.; Joshi, H. (eds.). Handbook of inclusive innovation: the role of organizations, markets and communities in social innovation. Cheltenham: Edward Elgar. ISBN 978-1-78643-601-6.
- Stott, Neil; Fava, Michelle; Tracey, Paul; Claus, Laura (2018). Leading urgent acts of categorisation: the construction of 'community anchor organizations'. Leading Social Innovation Symposium, Academy of Management Annual Meeting, 10–14 August 2018, Chicago, IL, USA.
- Stott, Neil; Fava, Michelle; Tracey, Paul; Claus, Laura (2018). Playing well with others? Community cross-sector work in poor places. Re-thinking Cross-Sector Social Innovation Conference, 6–7 April 2018, Social Innovation and Change Initiative, Harvard Kennedy School, Cambridge, MA, USA.
- Stott, Neil; Tracey, Paul (2017-08-08). "Organizing and innovating in poor places". Innovation. 20 (1). Informa UK Limited: 1–17. doi:10.1080/14479338.2017.1358093. ISSN 1447-9338. S2CID 149260490.
- Tracey, Paul; Phillips, Nelson (2016). "Managing the Consequences of Organizational Stigmatization: Identity Work in a Social Enterprise". Academy of Management Journal. 59 (3). Academy of Management: 740–765. doi:10.5465/amj.2013.0483. hdl:10044/1/23431. ISSN 0001-4273.
- Tracey, Paul; Stott, Neil (2016-12-28). "Social innovation: a window on alternative ways of organizing and innovating". Innovation. 19 (1). Informa UK Limited: 51–60. doi:10.1080/14479338.2016.1268924. hdl:11343/238572. ISSN 1447-9338. S2CID 152240356.
- Westley, Frances; Patton, Michael Quinn; Zimmerman, Brenda (2006). Getting to Maybe. Random House Canada. ISBN 0-679-31443-1.
- Westley, F.; McGowan, K.; Tjörnbo, O. (2017). The Evolution of Social Innovation: Building Resilience Through Transitions. Edward Elgar Publishing. ISBN 978-1-78643-114-1.
