= Dignita (restaurant) =

Restaurant in Amsterdam, Netherlands

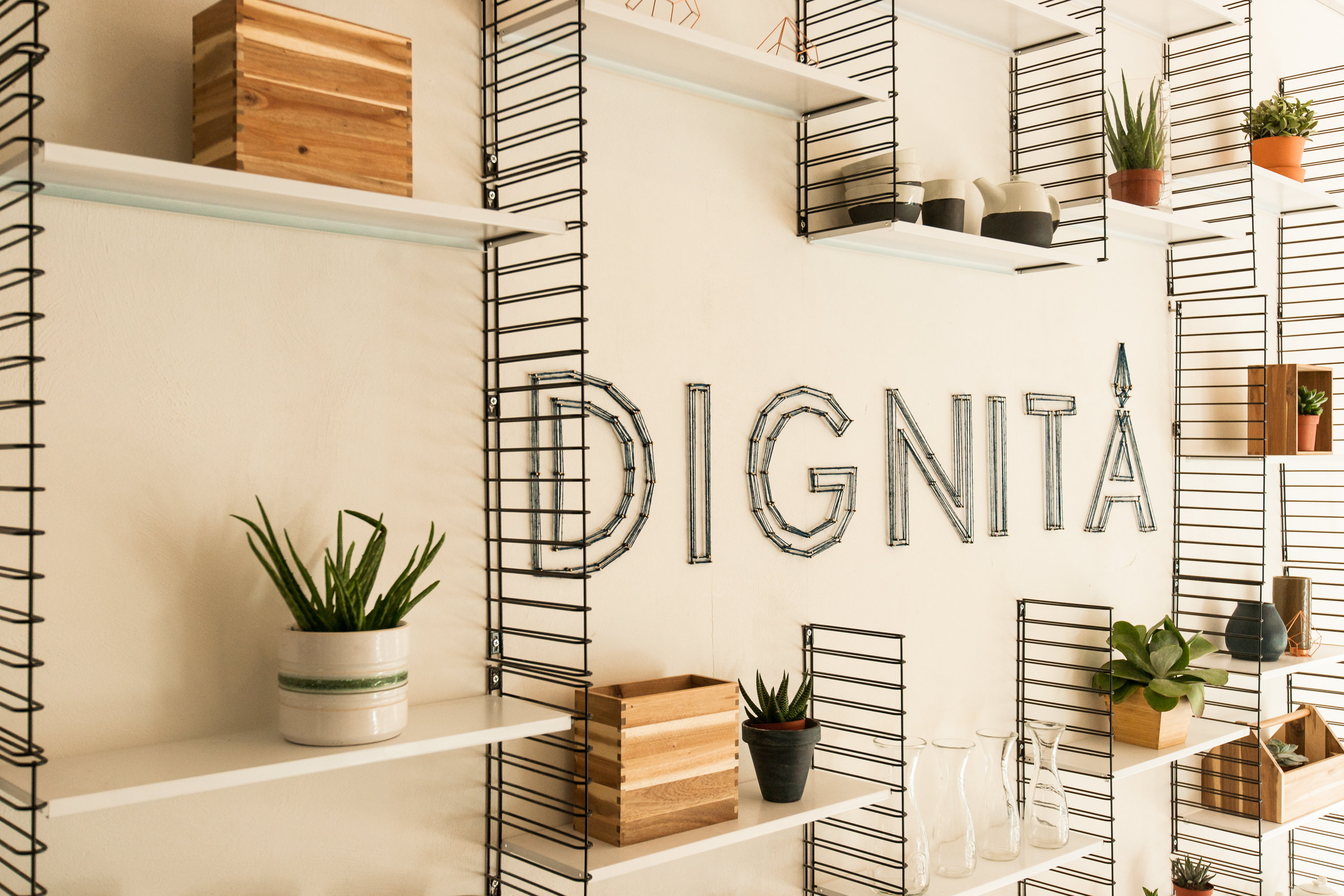
- Interior of Dignita restaurant, featuring the diamond motif
- Founded: 2015
- Founder: Toos Heemskerk-Schep, Not For Sale
- Type: Social enterprise
- Purpose: Vocational training, employment for trafficking survivors
- Location: Amsterdam, Netherlands
- Method: Social enterprise restaurant and academy
- Website: eatwelldogood.nl

Dignita is a social enterprise restaurant and vocational training academy in Amsterdam, Netherlands, that provides culinary training and employment to survivors of human trafficking. Founded in 2015 as part of the Dutch branch of the American nonprofit Not For Sale, Dignita grew out of a soup-making program that began training trafficking survivors in 2012.

The restaurant operates under the motto "Eat Well, Do Good" and is financially self-sustainable, with all profits reinvested into Not For Sale Netherlands programs. By 2016, more than 162 trainees had participated in the program. The organization also operates the Dignita Academy, a vocational training program offering skills in cooking, barista work, hospitality, administration, beauty, and language qualifications, and FAIR, a social enterprise providing accountancy and administration services.

Dignita has been featured by CNN, VICE, Paste Magazine, and Fondation Chanel. The Amsterdam tourism platform I amsterdam lists Dignita as a recommended restaurant.

== History ==
=== Context: human trafficking in the Netherlands ===
The Netherlands, and Amsterdam's Red Light District in particular, became a significant destination for human trafficking following the fall of communism in Eastern Europe. Post-Soviet poverty, corruption, and the collapse of industrial employment left unemployment among women in some regions at seventy to eighty percent, making them particularly vulnerable to recruitment by traffickers.

Traffickers typically used three methods to coerce women into prostitution in the Netherlands: the "loverboy technique" (courting a woman, creating emotional dependency, then coercing her into sex work); deception and force (false promises of legitimate work in Western Europe); and debt bondage, the most common method, in which a trafficker lends money to a woman in her home country and uses escalating interest rates and threats of violence to trap her indefinitely.

=== The Montara Circle Amsterdam (2012) ===
In 2012, Not For Sale co-founders David Batstone and Mark Wexler organized the Montara Circle Amsterdam alongside Toos Heemskerk-Schep, director of Not For Sale Netherlands, who was instrumental in convening local partners and shaping the European context of the gathering. A formal convening of entrepreneurs, investors, and social enterprise leaders tasked with developing commercial solutions to human trafficking in Europe, the event was modeled on the original Montara Circle in California that produced REBBL, and brought together stakeholders specifically focused on the destination country context: survivors in Amsterdam who needed employment and a pathway back to their home countries.

The strategic goal of the event was to establish an enterprise that temporarily employs survivors in Amsterdam and provides future employment for them upon their return to their home countries.

Following the Montara Circle Amsterdam, HEMA, the Dutch retail chain with over 650 stores across Western Europe, agreed to develop a line of co-branded Not For Sale products, beginning with produce grown by Not For Sale farm associations in Romania and Hungary and an apparel line produced at a Not For Sale project factory in India. HEMA also planned to introduce a Not For Sale soup product in its retail chain.

=== Origins: the HOME enterprise and soup program (2012) ===
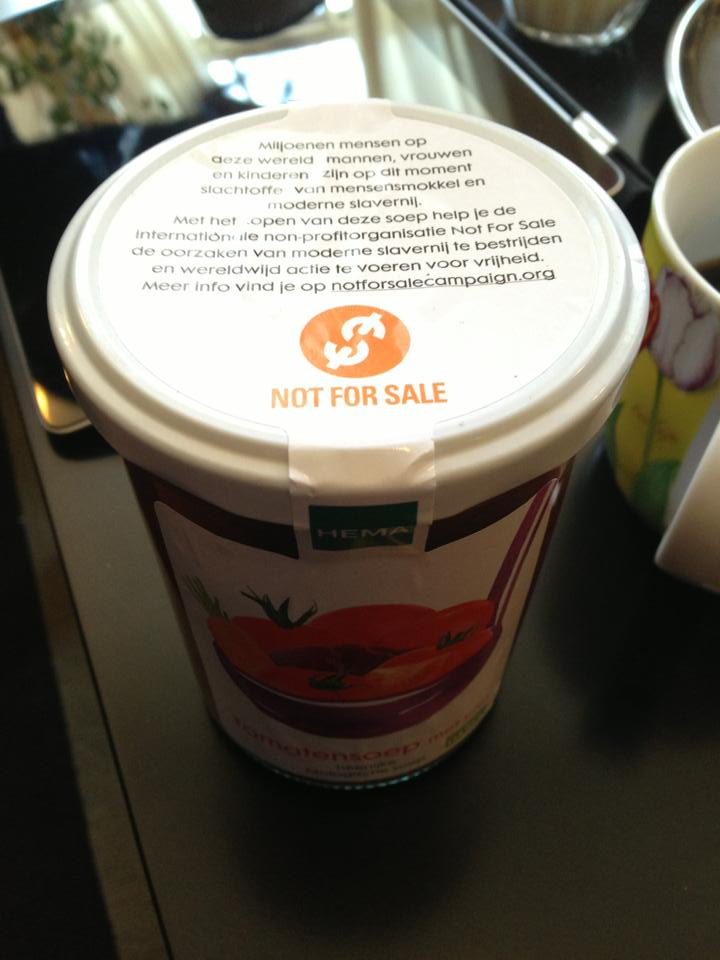
The HOME soup program, predecessor to Dignita restaurant, Amsterdam.

The day after the Montara Circle Amsterdam convening, Not For Sale launched a social enterprise called HOME, a specialty soup program in Amsterdam's Red Light District. The program was developed in partnership with a well-known Dutch gourmet soup restaurant. Its initial purpose was explicitly outreach: delivering soup to women working behind the windows in the Red Light District as a way to build relationships and offer a pathway out.

The chefs and caterers behind the HOME soup program were women who had themselves recently left the windows. The program thus operated simultaneously as a training vehicle for survivors and a community bridge to those still in the sex trade.

Not For Sale Netherlands was established under the direction of Toos Heemskerk-Schep, a social worker who had begun her career in Amsterdam's Red Light District and had direct experience with human trafficking in the city.

The formal program trained trafficking survivors living in Amsterdam safe houses to prepare healthy soups and salads in a professional kitchen over four weeks, receiving a Not For Sale certificate upon completion. The soup was then sold and delivered twice weekly to women in the Red Light District, creating both a revenue stream and a point of human contact.

=== Opening of Dignita restaurant (2015) ===
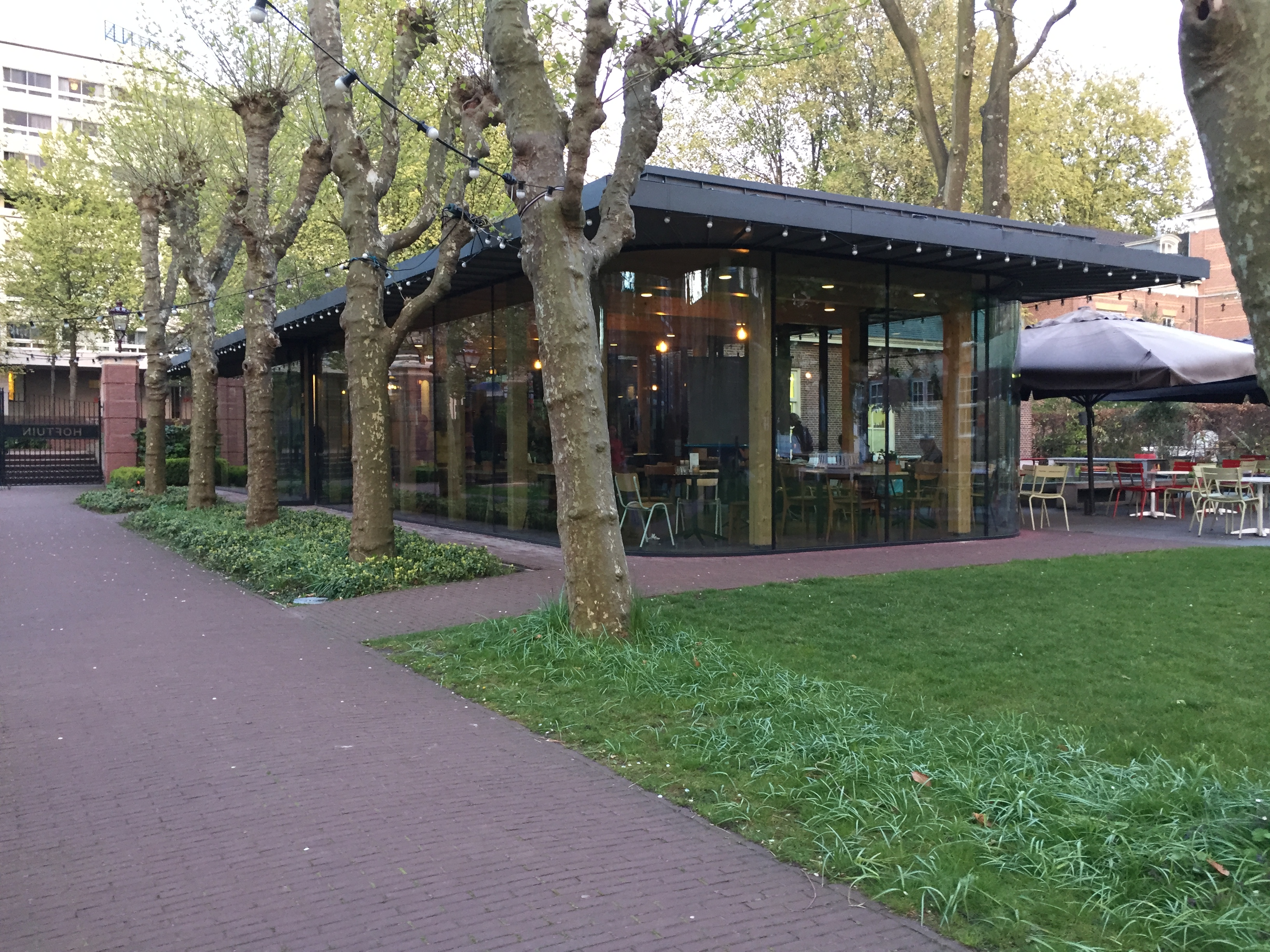
Dignita restaurant, Vondelpark location, Amsterdam.

After four years of development growing from the HOME soup enterprise, Heemskerk-Schep and Not For Sale Netherlands scaled the program into a full brunch restaurant. Dignita opened in Amsterdam's Vondelpark in 2015.

The concept was to build a profitable, self-sustaining restaurant where trafficking survivors could train and gain qualifications while working alongside professional kitchen and hospitality staff. CNN reported that the day-to-day social interaction in a safe working environment helped survivors overcome past trauma in ways that formal programs alone could not. Heemskerk-Schep told CNN that community belonging was as important as job training: "It's incredibly important also that they become part of our community here."

The restaurant's interior features diamond-shaped ornaments throughout. Heemskerk-Schep told VICE: "We chose these diamonds because that's how we see the girls who come through here."

Dignita grew to operate three locations in Amsterdam: Vondelpark, Hoftuin, and Westerpark. As of 2026, the restaurant has consolidated to its Hoftuin location.

== Dignita Academy ==
Following their initial training at Dignita, graduates have the opportunity to continue their development through the Dignita Academy. The academy offers a range of vocational and life skills training including professional cooking and food preparation, barista skills, beauty and personal care, citizenship and civic integration courses, administration and business skills, tax and financial literacy, computing and digital skills, and language qualifications.

Not For Sale Netherlands also partnered with ROC van Amsterdam, one of the Netherlands' largest vocational training colleges, to offer a three-month hospitality training module. Graduates of this extended program receive a nationally recognized hospitality qualification.

== FAIR ==
Not For Sale Netherlands also established FAIR, a social enterprise providing accountancy and administration support services. FAIR was created as an additional pathway for trafficking survivors to develop professional skills in business administration, complementing the hospitality training offered through Dignita and the Dignita Academy.

== Impact ==
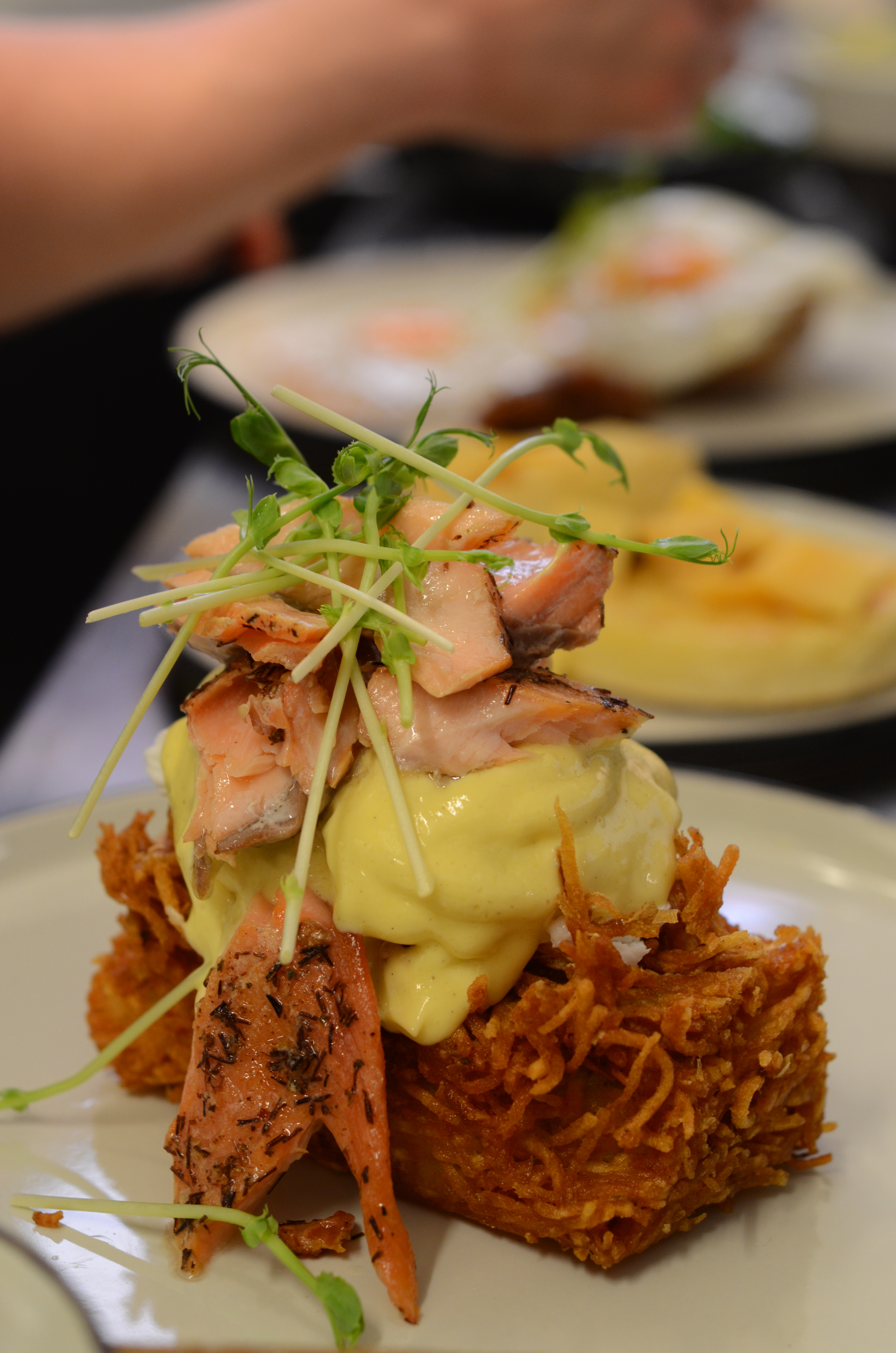
Food served at Dignita restaurant, Amsterdam.

By 2016, CNN reported that 162 trainees had participated in the Dignita program. Graduates leave with professional certifications, work experience, and restored self-confidence and social connection.

The VICE profile featured the story of a Hungarian woman who had been forced into the Amsterdam sex trade for four years after being lured with the promise of a hotel job. She told VICE that the recipe she prepared at Dignita was from her hometown, illustrating how the program creates space for participants to reconnect with their own identities beyond their experience of exploitation.

The restaurant model demonstrates that social enterprises serving trafficking survivors can be financially self-sustaining without relying on donations. All profits from Dignita are reinvested into Not For Sale Netherlands programs.

In September 2024, Dignita won the Lightspeed Commerce Hospitality Award, selected from seven nominated hospitality concepts across the Netherlands. The award, presented at The Anthony Hotel in Utrecht, recognizes hospitality businesses for sustainability, innovation, and digitalization. Toos Heemskerk accepted the award on behalf of Dignita, saying: "It is an honor to receive this award. How special it is that we as a company can give something back to society, partly thanks to companies that support us with software. This allows us to invest in what really matters: training our employees."

== Organizational structure ==
Dignita is a social enterprise of Not For Sale Netherlands (Stichting Dignita), itself a branch of the American nonprofit Not For Sale, co-founded by David Batstone and Mark Wexler in 2007.

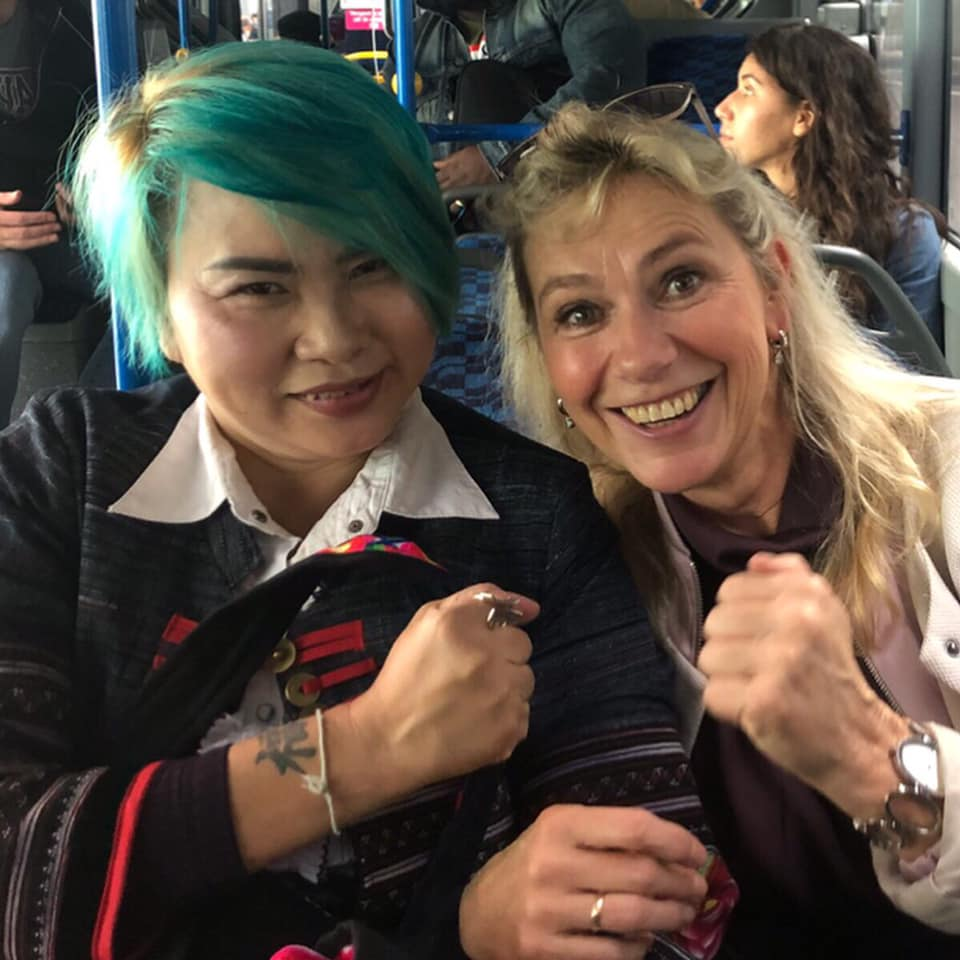
Kru Nam (left) and Toos Heemskerk-Schep, director of Not For Sale Netherlands and founder of Dignita.

Toos Heemskerk-Schep serves as director of Not For Sale Netherlands and is the driving force behind Dignita and its associated programs. Her background as a social worker in Amsterdam's Red Light District directly informed the program's design, which prioritizes community integration and dignity over clinical intervention.

Dignita has received support from Fondation Chanel, which profiled the program as an example of how entrepreneurship creates social enterprises in both origin and destination countries to fight human trafficking.

The Dutch retail chain HEMA, with over 650 stores across Western Europe, was an early strategic partner. HEMA operates across the Netherlands, Belgium, Germany, France, Austria, Luxembourg, and Spain.

== Connection to Not For Sale global network ==
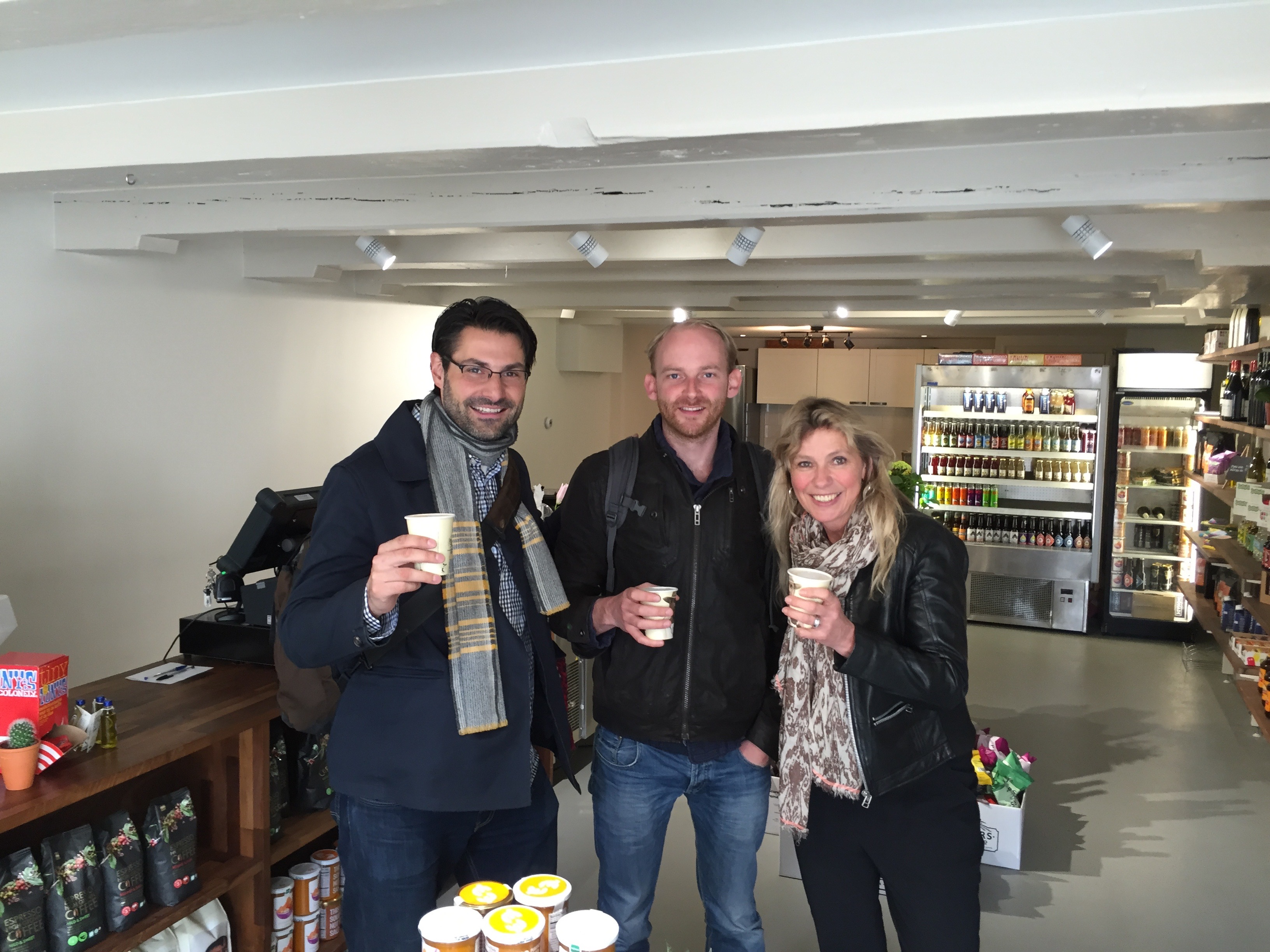
Mark Wexler and Toos Heemskerk-Schep at Dignita restaurant, Amsterdam.

Dignita represents a key example of Not For Sale's enterprise-driven model, in which the organization creates self-sustaining businesses designed to address the root causes of trafficking and provide economic alternatives for survivors. Within the Not For Sale portfolio, Dignita operates alongside REBBL (a plant-based beverage company addressing trafficking in Peru's Amazon rainforest), Baan Kru Nam (a children's village in Thailand), AFIMAD (an indigenous cooperative in Peru), and Regenerate Technology Global (a battery recycling company).

== Media coverage ==
Dignita has received coverage from multiple international media outlets. CNN profiled the restaurant in September 2016, reporting on its 162 trainees and the program's approach to combining professional training with community reintegration. VICE published a detailed feature in May 2016 about the soup-making program and its connection to the Red Light District, including interviews with trainees and Heemskerk-Schep. Paste Magazine described the program as helping survivors of human trafficking one meal at a time. Darling Magazine profiled Not For Sale's enterprise-driven approach, highlighting Dignita as a key example of the organization's model. Fondation Chanel featured Not For Sale Netherlands and Dignita as a supported project, describing the program as a model for restoring dignity to survivors of trafficking.

== Awards and recognition ==
- Lightspeed Commerce Hospitality Award (2024), selected from seven nominated hospitality concepts across the Netherlands

== See also ==
- Human trafficking in the Netherlands
- Social enterprise
- Red-light district
- Modern slavery
