= Cascade Funding =

European Commission mechanism to distribute public funding

Cascade Funding, also known as Financial Support for Third Parties (FSTP), is a European Commission mechanism to distribute public funding in order to assist beneficiaries, such as start-ups, scale-ups, Small and medium enterprises (SME) and/or mid-caps, in the uptake or development of digital innovation.

== Intended purpose ==
This funding method aims at simplifying the administrative procedures, creating a light, SME-friendly application scheme, by allowing that some EU-funded projects may issue, in turn, open calls for further funding. This scheme is based on the model of Erasmus students and was first introduced by the European Commission in Horizon 2020, the Framework Programme for Research and Innovation (2014–2020).

== Previous schemes and differences ==
Cascade funding in Horizon 2020 primarily served as a pilot mechanism to simplify access to EU funding, focusing on ICT and digital innovation through smaller, third-party grants. In Horizon Europe, this mechanism is more systematically integrated across multiple clusters, namely Cluster 4 (Digital, Industry and Space), and is applied more strategically to scale up innovation, reach new actors (especially SMEs and startups), and streamline administrative processes. Horizon Europe also introduces clearer frameworks and broader thematic use for cascade funding beyond digital sectors.

Some previous experiences under the 7th Framework Programme for Research and Innovation (FP7), such as Future Internet Public Private Partnership (FI-PPP) and ICT Innovation for Manufacturing SMEs (I4MS), had already piloted a similar model which is a good example of the structure and principles envisaged to be applied in the implementation scheme.

However, the procedure to provide financial support to third parties under Horizon 2020 is significantly different than in those experiences, in which third parties became beneficiary of the project they were selected by and entered in a contract with the European Commission. Instead, third parties receiving cascade funding under Horizon 2020 have a contract with the consortium of the EU-funded project of which they become a third party. This means that this consortium is liable towards the European Commission for the third parties to which it provide financial support and, hence, no legal and financial validation is necessary for these third parties, which makes quicker/easier for projects to have open calls in their projects.

== Open calls ==
These open calls from EU-funded projects are usually competitive, have a European dimension and aims at:

- selecting tech start-ups or scale-ups for acceleration or incubation purposes (usually equity free),
- supporting pilots, demonstrations and/or experiments on a specific innovative technology or framework (usually with the participation of start-ups or SME), or
- integrating more participants to the project to extend its scope or to address specific tasks.

Support offered by these open calls, usually consist in funding (typically in the range of €50,000 to €150,000) but it may also be vouchers for support services or free access and support to use testing facilities.

Most of the open calls issued during Horizon 2020 belong to one (or more) of the following domains: Future Internet and Next Generation Internet, Smartisation, Industry 4.0 (ICT for Industry), Internet of Things (IoT), Robotics, Big Data, Photonics, Innovation throughout value chains, and the nexus between creativity and technology.

Following Horizon 2020, Horizon Europe deploys FSTP in a similar manner, primarily under the following clusters:

- Cluster 4: Digital, Industry and Space – Main hub for cascade funding, widely applied across open call topics.
- Cluster 1: Health – Used in selected topics for digital health and health systems innovation.
- Cluster 2: Culture, Creativity and Inclusive Society – Applied in specific areas such as cultural heritage and social innovation.
- Cluster 3: Civil Security for Society – Occasionally used in targeted security-related topics.
- Cluster 5: Climate, Energy and Mobility – Applied in areas like clean energy transitions and sustainable mobility.
- Cluster 6: Food, Bioeconomy, Natural Resources, Agriculture and Environment – Used in topics related to agroecology, biodiversity, and sustainable agriculture.

Open calls in the field of smartization and industry are linked to the creation of a pan-european network of Digital Innovation Hubs under the European Union initiatives Smart Anything Everywhere (SAE) and ICT Innovation for Manufacturing SMEs (I4MS), which are both part of the Digitising European Industry strategy.

Cascade funding is increasingly used throughout the "Information and Communication Technologies" priority in Horizon 2020 and contributes "to knowledge transfer and exploitation, take-up of technologies, and building and scaling ecosystems in these areas". During the new Horizon Europe Framework Programme for Research and Innovation by the European Commission this mechanism has been extended mainly in Cluster 4 (inheriting ICT from Horizon 2020) but also in other clusters.

A number of companies have specialized in the management and participation as "grant managers" through these schemes. Examples are reframe.food'sOpencalls.fund. Sploro, F6S or Funding Box.

== Open calls listings ==
There are different sources listing an updated source of open calls available online

- European Commission's website: Not all the open calls are listed, as the projects need to actively apply for the public listing.
- Sploro Cascade Funding website: Most complete source in the market. Includes an alert system (via email) and it is free.
