= Jindal Centre for Social Innovation & Entrepreneurship =

Jindal Centre for Social Innovation + Entrepreneurship (JSiE)
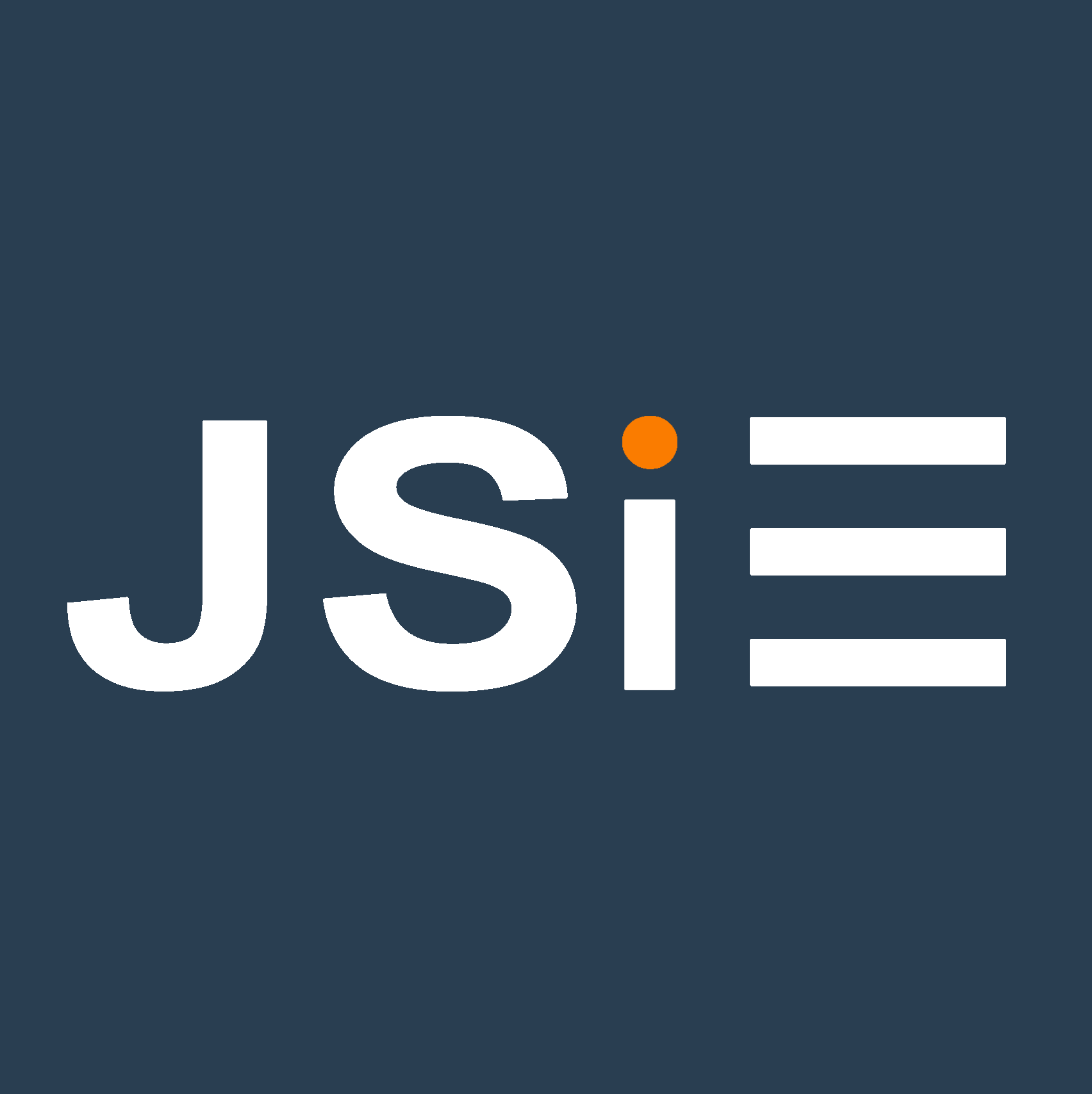
- Founded: 2014
- Location: Sonipat, Haryana, India
- Founding Director: Jeremy J. Wade
- Affiliations: O. P. Jindal Global University
- Website: jsie.in

The Jindal Centre for Social Innovation + Entrepreneurship (JSiE), is a research and innovation unit of O. P. Jindal Global University which aims to strengthen the capacity for social innovation and sustainability leadership through online learning and incubation to social impact startups in the Delhi, India area.

== Tibetan Entrepreneur Incubation ==
JSiE is an incubation partner to the Tibetan Entrepreneurship Development initiative, conducting three annual incubation cycles supporting Tibetan entrepreneurs living in India. JSiE is a member of UBI Global Incubation Network and the Global Social Entrepreneurship Network.

== Online Learning ==
JSiE has created a series of Massive Open Online Courses (MOOCs) in partnership with FutureLearn, Europe's leading online social learning platform. In 2019, JSiE launched an online course on impact investing. The course was created in partnership with the Asha Impact, one of India's leading impact funds and development think tanks.

== International Social Innovation Challenge (ISIC-15) ==
ISIC-15, an inaugural event organized jointly by O. P. Jindal Global University, the University of Southampton and the Lahore University of Management Sciences, took place in August 2015 and was designed around the theme of 'Empowering Women through Safer Communities' in Delhi, India. The format consisted of students from India, Pakistan, and UK students divided into teams and undergoing 10 days of skill-focused workshops to facilitate the creation of sustainable social enterprises. ISIC-15 was featured on the NDTV program Heads-Up.
