= Jürgen Howaldt =

German sociologist

Jürgen Howaldt (born 1960 in Duisburg) is a German sociologist. He is professor of Social Innovation and Work at the Faculty of Social Science, TU Dortmund University. and director of Social Research Centre Dortmund, TU Dortmund University. Jürgen Howaldt is mainly known for his conceptual work on social innovation.

== Education ==
In 1982, Jürgen Howaldt began his studies of sociology at Bielefeld University and concluded them in Duisburg (Social Sciences) in 1989. Having successfully graduated in Social Sciences at Gerhard-Mercator-University of Duisburg, he completed his PhD on the role of sociology in processes of organisational development at the Faculty of Social Sciences and Economics, TU Dortmund University in 1996. In 2005, he successfully defended his habilitation at the faculty of human and health sciences of the University Bremen. In his habilitation thesis, Howaldt focussed on new forms of knowledge production from a sociological perspective.

== Academic career ==
After his studies in Social Sciences, Howaldt became a researcher at the Social Research Centre Dortmund (Sozialforschungsstelle Dortmund) in 1990. In 1993, he became the coordinator of the research unit “organisational development, consulting, and industrial relations” and in 2002, he was appointed as managing director. He was adjunct professor at the faculty of human and health sciences at University Bremen from 2003 to 2005. In 2005, he became honorary professor at the faculty of social sciences and economics at TU Dortmund University. After the integration of the Social Research Centre into the TU Dortmund University, in 2007, Jürgen Howaldt was appointed as professor of organisational sociology and work, in 2009. Since 2020, he is a professor of social innovation and works at the newly established faculty of social sciences

== Research focus and academic activities ==
As sociologist, Jürgen Howaldt is mainly known for his conceptual work on social innovation. Together with Michael Schwarz, he developed a concept of social innovation based on social theory, which describes social innovation as a new combination and/or new configuration of social practices with the goal of better satisfying needs and answering problems than is possible on the basis of established practices. He refined this perspective, which regards social innovation as part of a new innovation paradigm, in a series of national and international research projects. From 2014-2017, he was scientific coordinator of the international research project SI-DRIVE. He has been chair of the European School of Social Innovation, since 2017, and represents the TU Dortmund University at the EU-SPRI-Forum since 2019. He has been member of the expert group “Transfer and Cooperation“ of the German Rector’s Conference since 2017 and was a member of the advisory board of the Project “WISIH: Paths and indicators of social innovations driven by higher education institutions in the field of Nursing Science and Occupational, Organisational and Business Psychology“. Since 2021 he is member of the Advisory Board of the Social Innovation-Hub ERA-Chair, Nova School of Business and Economics and member of the Programme Jury “Society of Ideas”, German Ministry of Research and Education. Jürgen Howaldt is co-editor of the Atlas of Social Innovation, the "Research Agenda for Social Innovation", and "Encyclopedia of Social Innovation".

== Selected publications ==
=== Monographies ===
- with Ralf Kopp & Michael Schwarz: On the theory of social innovations: Tarde's neglected contribution to the development of a sociological innovation theory. Beltz Juventa, Weinheim, 2015. (PDF)
- Dmitri Domanski, Jürgen Howaldt, Pablo Villalobos, Carlos Huenchuleo: Social Innovation in Latin America: The Chilean Case. CIEPLAN, Santiago de Chile, 2015. (PDF)
- with Michael Schwarz: Social Innovation: Concepts, Research Fields and International Trends. In: Klaus Henning, Frank Hees (eds.): Studies for Innovation in a Modern Working Environment - International Monitoring, Volume 5. IMA/ZLW & IfU, Aachen 2010 (PDF)
- (in German) Neue Formen sozialwissenschaftlicher Wissensproduktion in der Wissensgesellschaft. Forschung und Beratung in betrieblichen und regionalen Innovationsprozessen, LIT-Verlag, Münster, 2004, ISBN 3-8258-7744-2
- (in German) Industriesoziologie und Organisationsberatung. Einführung von Gruppenarbeit in der Automobil- und Chemieindustrie: Zwei Beispiele (Dissertation), Campus, Frankfurt/New York, 1996, ISBN 3-593-35621-X

=== Edited Books and Special Issues ===
- with Christoph Kaletka: Encyclopedia of Social Innovation. Edward Elgar Publishing 2023. ISBN 978-1-80037-334-1
- with Christoph Kaletka & Antonius Schröder: A Research Agenda for Social Innovation. Edward Elgar Publishing 2021. ISBN 978-1-78990-934-0
- with Christoph Kaletka, Antonius Schröder & Marthe Zirngiebl: Atlas of Social Innovation 2nd Volume: A World of New Practices. Oekom Verlag 2019. ISBN 978-3962381578.
- with Christoph Kaletka, Antonius Schröder & Marthe Zirngiebl: Atlas of Social Innovation - New Practices for a Better Future. Sozialforschungsstelle, Dortmund 2018. (PDF)
- with Peter R.A. Oeji: Special Issue: Workplace Innovation – Social Innovation: Shaping Work Organisation and Working Life. In: World Review of Entrepreneurship, Management and Sustainable Development, Vol. 12, No. 1, 2016.
- Hans Werner Franz, Josef Hochgerner, Jürgen Howaldt (in German): Challenge Social Innovation. Potentials for Business, Social Entrepreneurship, Welfare and Civil Society. Springer, Heidelberg/New York/Dordrecht/London 2012, ISBN 3642328792
- Becker, Thomas; Dammer, Ingo; Howaldt, Jürgen; Loose, Achim (in German): Netzwerkmanagement. Mit Kooperation zum Unternehmenserfolg, Springer, Berlin/Heidelberg/New York, 2011, 3. überarbeitete und erweiterte Auflage, ISBN 9783642193323
- with Heike Jacobsen (in German): Soziale Innovation. Auf dem Weg zu einem postindustriellen Innovationsparadigma, VS-Verlag, Wiesbaden, 2010, ISBN 978-3531168241

=== Articles ===
- Dmitri Domanski, Jürgen Howaldt, Christoph Kaletka: A Comprehensive Concept of Innovation and its Implications for the Local Context – on the Growing Importance of Social Innovation Ecosystems and Infrastructures. In: European Planning Studies 2020, 28 (3), Special Issue "Struggling with Innovations", 454 – 474, doi.org/10.1080/09654313.2019.1639397
- Mark Majewski Anderson, Dmitri Domanski, Jürgen Howaldt: Social innovation as a chance and a challenge for higher education institutions. Why higher education institutions are important for social innovation and how they can promote social innovation initiatives and projects. In: Howaldt, Jürgen; Kaletka, Christoph; Schröder, Antonius; Zirngiebl, Marthe (Eds.): Atlas of social innovation; Dortmund: Sfs, 2018, 51 – 54.
- New Pathways to Social Change – Creating Impact through Social Innovation Research. In: fteval Journal for Research and Technology Policy Evaluation, Proceedings of the Conference” Impact of Social Sciences and Humanities for a European Research Agenda. Vienna, 2019, 37 – 48, (PDF)
- with Michael Schwarz: Social Innovation and Human Development—How the Capabilities Approach and Social Innovation Theory Mutually Support Each Other. In: Journal of Human Development and Capabilities. Published online: 9 January 2017. 163-180, doi.org/10.1080/19452829.2016.1251401
- Dmitri Domanski, Jürgen Howaldt, Antonius Schröder: Social Innovation in Latin America. In: Journal of Human Development and Capabilities, Vol 17, No. 2, 2017, 307-312. doi.org/10.1080/19452829.2017.1299698
- with Ralf Kopp & Jürgen Schultze: Why Industry 4.0 needs Workplace Innovation: a critical look at the German debate on advanced manufacturing. In: European Journal of Workplace Innovation, Vol 2, No 1, 2016, 7 – 18, doi.org/10.46364/ejwi.v2i1.373
- with Dmitri Domanski & Christoph Kaletka: Social innovation: towards a new innovation paradigm. In: Mackenzie Management Review, 17(6), 2016, Special Edition, 20 – 44, doi.org/10.1590/1678-69712016/administracao.v17n6p20-44
- with Dmitri Domanski & Michael Schwarz: Rethinking social entrepreneurship: The concept of social entrepreneurship under the perspective of socio-scientific innovation research. In: Journal of Creativity and Business Innovation, 1, 2015, 88 – 98, (PDF)
- with Anna Butzin, Dmitri Domanski, Christoph Kaletka: Theoretical Approaches to Social Innovation - A Critical Literature Review. A deliverable of the project: “Social Innovation: Driving Force of Social Change” (SI-DRIVE), 2014 Dortmund: Sozialforschungsstelle
