= Frances Westley =

Canadian academic

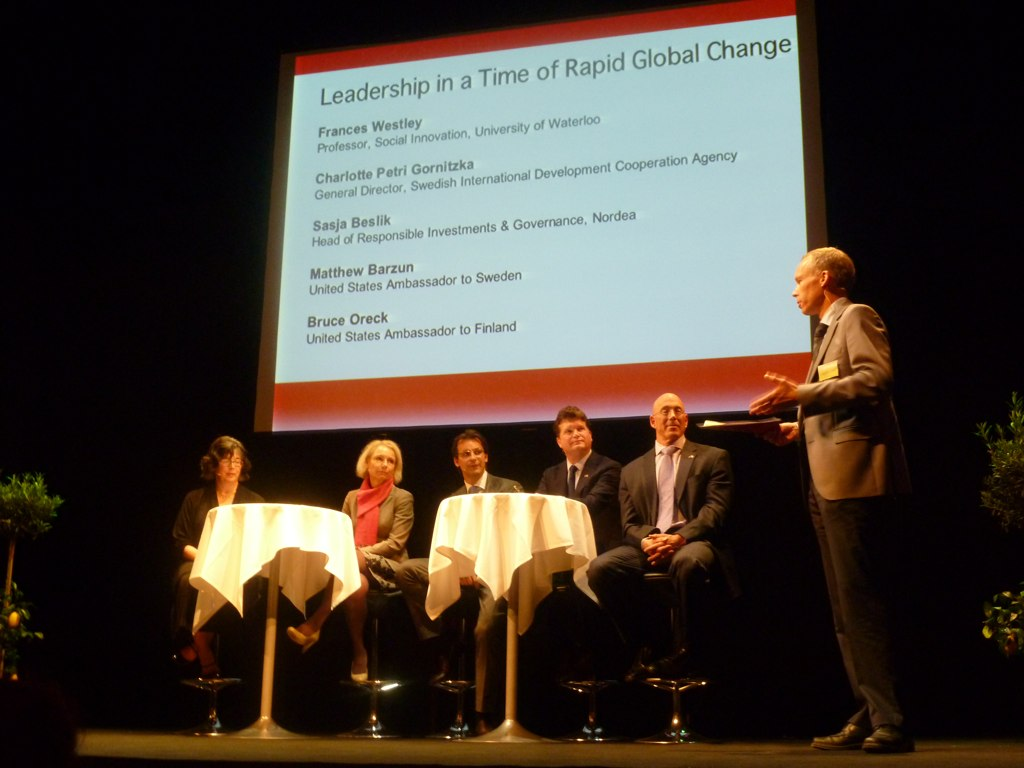
- Westley (left)
- Occupations: J.W. McConnell professor, University of Waterloo
- Board member of: Stockholm Resilience Centre; Engineers Without Borders Canada

Academic background
- Education: McGill University

Academic work
- Discipline: Management
- Sub-discipline: social innovation, resilience

Frances Westley CM is a Canadian academic. She is the J.W. McConnell professor of social innovation at the University of Waterloo in Waterloo, Ontario. She was previously the James McGill professor of strategy at McGill University, and, from 2005 to 2007, director of the Nelson Institute for Environmental Studies of the University of Wisconsin-Madison. She chairs the board of the Stockholm Resilience Centre at Stockholm University, and is on the board of Engineers Without Borders Canada.

Westley was made a member of the Order of Canada in 2021.

== Publications ==
Wesley has co-edited two books:

- with Michael Quinn Patton and Brenda Zimmerman: Getting to Maybe: How the World is Changed. Toronto: Random House Canada, 2007. ISBN 9780679314448
- with Katharine McGowan and Ola Tjörnbo: The Evolution of Social Innovation: Building Resilience Through Transitions. Cheltenham: Edward Elgar Publishing, 2017. ISBN 9781786431158.
