= Jeremy Affeldt =

American baseball player (born 1979)

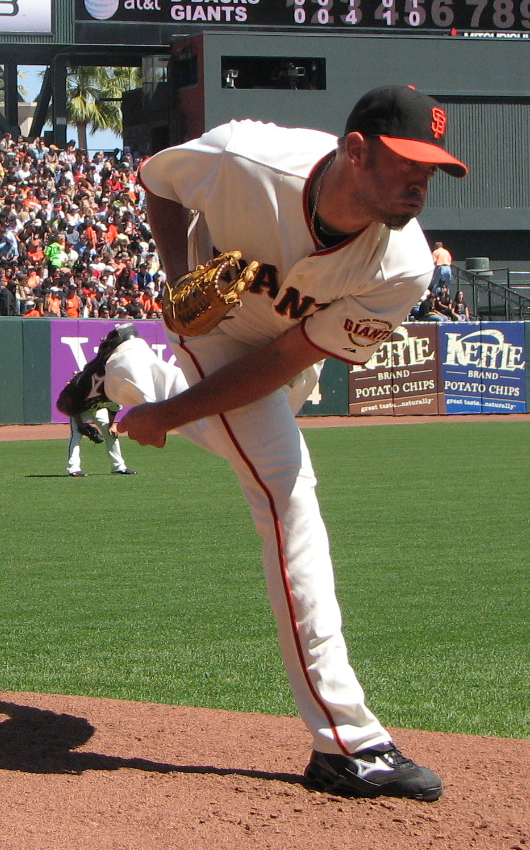
- Affeldt with the San Francisco Giants
- Pitcher
- Born: June 6, 1979 (age 47); Phoenix, Arizona, U.S.
- Batted: Left Threw: Left

MLB debut
- April 6, 2002, for the Kansas City Royals

Last MLB appearance
- October 4, 2015, for the San Francisco Giants

MLB statistics
- Win–loss record: 43–46
- Earned run average: 3.97
- Strikeouts: 720
- Stats at Baseball Reference

Teams
- Kansas City Royals (2002–2006); Colorado Rockies (2006–2007); Cincinnati Reds (2008); San Francisco Giants (2009–2015)

Career highlights and awards
- 3× World Series champion (2010, 2012, 2014); San Francisco Giants Wall of Fame

Jeremy David Affeldt (/ˈæfɛlt/; born June 6, 1979) is an American former professional baseball player. He pitched and batted left-handed and played in Major League Baseball (MLB) for the Kansas City Royals, Colorado Rockies, Cincinnati Reds and San Francisco Giants.

Affeldt was a third-round draft pick by the Kansas City Royals in 1997 MLB draft. He made the team in 2002, and started part of the year for them. In five seasons with the Royals, Affeldt bounced back and forth between the starting rotation and the bullpen. In 2006, he was traded to the Colorado Rockies at the trade deadline, and was a member of the Rockies 2007 World Series team. After one season with the Cincinnati Reds, he signed with the San Francisco Giants in 2009, where he was a member of the 2010, 2012, and 2014 World Series championship teams.

== Early life ==
Jeremy David Affeldt was born on June 6, 1979, in Phoenix, Arizona, to David and Charlotte Affeldt. His father was a member of the United States Air Force, and Affeldt lived in Guam, Merced, California, and Spokane, Washington, growing up. While in Merced, Affeldt and his father would frequently attend Oakland Athletics games, and Affeldt enjoyed watching Mark McGwire, Jose Canseco, and Dave Stewart. Affeldt attended Northwest Christian High School, a Division 2-B school in Colbert, Washington. He participated in three sports while there, but it was baseball that drove several major league scouts to the school to see him pitch. He graduated in 1997.

== Professional career ==
=== Draft and minor leagues ===
Affeldt was drafted by the Kansas City Royals in the third round of the 1997 MLB draft. Affeldt ultimately decided not to accept a scholarship offer to play college baseball for his hometown Gonzaga University. He spent 1997 pitching for the rookie–league Gulf Coast League Royals. While with them, he went 2–0 with a 4.50 ERA in ten games (nine starts).

Affeldt improved with the GCL Royals the next year, going 4–3 with a 2.89 ERA in twelve games (nine starts). His performance even earned him a promotion to the single-A Lansing Lugnuts. Affeldt did not do well in his time with them, though, as he went 0–3 with a 9.53 ERA in six games (three starts).

In 1999, Affeldt spent the entire season with the Royals' single-A affiliate, which had changed to the Charleston Alley Cats during the offseason. Although he only went 7–7, he had a 3.83 ERA in twenty–seven games (twenty–four starts).

Affeldt pitched with the Wilmington Blue Rocks of the single-A advanced Carolina League in 2000. While with Wilmington, he led the entire Kansas City Royals' organization (and the Carolina League) with fifteen losses (to go with only five wins). He also threw seventeen wild pitches. However, his ERA was 4.09, and the Blue Rocks were only a half–game ahead of the worst team in the league (the Potomac Cannons).

2001 was a better season for Affeldt, as he went 10–6 with a 3.90 ERA in twenty–five starts for the double-A Wichita Wranglers. He was selected to pitch in the Texas League All-Star Game, and he was named to the postseason All–Star team.

=== Kansas City Royals (2002–2006) ===
==== 2002 ====
Affeldt was not expected to make the Kansas City Royals' roster in 2002, but he was added to the bullpen after he had an 0.64 ERA and fourteen strikeouts (to go with just two walks) in fourteen innings in Spring training. His major league debut came on April 6 against the Chicago White Sox. He pitched two innings, giving up three hits and a run in a 14–0 loss. On April 24, Affeldt picked up his first major league win by pitching 3.2 innings of relief in an 8–2 win over the Detroit Tigers.

Affeldt's time in the bullpen did not last long. On May 3, he replaced Bryan Rekar in the Royals' starting rotation. In his first start, he pitched four innings, gave up one run, and earned a no–decision in a 4–3 loss to the Baltimore Orioles. Affeldt's time as a starter garnered so-so results, as he was 0–4 with a 5.45 ERA in seven starts. In his last start, on June 8, Affeldt picked up the loss as the Royals fell 11–3 to the St. Louis Cardinals. After getting pulled in the fourth inning due to an injury, Affeldt was placed on the disabled list with fingernail and blister problems.

After making three rehab starts in Wichita, Affeldt returned to the Royals on August 2 and threw a perfect inning against the Minnesota Twins. He remained in the bullpen for the remainder of the 2002 season. After the season, he pitched in a winter league in the Dominican Republic.

==== 2003 ====
In 2003, Affeldt found himself competing with Runelvys Hernández for the first spot in the Royals' starting rotation during Spring training. Because Tony Peña, the Royals' manager, was unable to decide which one would be the ace, he flipped a coin to determine who would be number one. Hernández won the toss.

Affeldt was placed on the disabled list after only four games with blister problems again. His time on the DL was brief and he returned to the Royals on May 6. On May 28, he struck out a career high eight batters in a win against the Minnesota Twins. Later, on June 6, he notched his first hit.

Affeldt's final start of the year came on July 23, in a game he won against Minnesota. After the start, the Royals moved him to the bullpen to try to fix his blister problems. The move was originally thought to be temporary. While in the bullpen, on August 3, he got his career first save in a 2–0 win over the Tampa Bay Devil Rays. On August 21, the Royals announced that Affeldt would spend the rest of the year in the bullpen. Two days later, he got another save against Minnesota. He picked up two more saves before the end of the year and finished with a 7–6 record and a 3.93 ERA. After the season, to try to help with his blister problems, he had part of a fingernail on the middle finger of his left hand removed. Also, the Royals announced that if he developed blister problems again, he would be sent to the bullpen for good.

==== 2004 ====
In 2004, Affeldt was named the Royals' third starter out of Spring training. He went 0–3 with a 5.24 ERA in eight starts. His final start of 2004 came on May 18 against the Texas Rangers. Affeldt gave up five runs in four innings and received a no–decision in a 7–6 victory by the Royals. Afterwards, although his blister problems had not resurfaced, manager Tony Peña named him the Royals closer on May 21 due to poor pitching and injury problems with the other Royals closers.

Affeldt blew his first save opportunity of 2004 against the Oakland Athletics on May 22, but he converted in his next outing on May 25 against the Detroit Tigers. He converted eight of ten save opportunities before he was placed on the disabled list on June 27 with a partially torn rib–cage muscle. He was out for almost eight weeks.

After making four rehab appearances for AAA Omaha, Affeldt returned to the Royals on August 21. He made his first appearance since returning from the DL on August 22, but he did not get another save until September 1 in a 1–0 victory over the Tigers. He picked up four more saves to finish the year with a career–high 13 saves and a 4.95 ERA.

==== 2005 ====
In 2005, Affeldt was again expected to be the Royals' closer. However, he did not get a save opportunity until April 16 against Detroit, and he was unable to finish that game because of a groin injury that landed him on the disabled list again. After rehabbing in Omaha, Affeldt returned to the Royals on June 4. He was no longer the closer, however, because Mike MacDougal had been closing well in his absence. Affeldt was not healthy for long, as he returned to the disabled list on June 20 after reaggravating the groin injury.

Affeldt returned to the Royals on July 7. Through July 27, he had a 2.18 ERA. He did not give up more than one earned run until August 5, when he got his first loss of the year against the Oakland Athletics. However, Affeldt had a 12.71 ERA in his next eighteen appearances, which raised his ERA to 6.93. He held opposing batters scoreless for the final nine games of the season to bring it down to a season–ending 5.26.

==== 2006 ====
Affeldt returned to Kansas City's starting rotation in 2006 when he was named the fourth starter during Spring training. However, he was moved up to the third spot before the season began when Runelvys Hernández was demoted to the fifth spot. Affeldt struggled as a starter, going 2–5 with a 7.80 ERA in nine starts. His final major league start came on May 27 against the New York Yankees. He gave up ten runs on eleven hits in a 15–4 loss. After the start, he was sent to the bullpen, and Bobby Keppel filled his place in the starting rotation. Affeldt improved in the bullpen, posting a 2.91 ERA there through July 31.

Years later, reflecting on his tenure with the Royals, Affeldt said, "I was pretty frustrated. I wanted to quit. I didn't want to go to the ballpark. I was just failing a lot. I was getting hurt. I didn't understand my role. I bounced around and I just didn't enjoy the game." At the trade deadline on July 31, Affeldt was traded along with Denny Bautista to the Colorado Rockies for Ryan Shealy and Scott Dohmann. Affeldt recalled, "When [Royals General Manager Dayton Moore] traded me, he said, 'I feel like I need to give you a fresh start. You can learn to enjoy the game again.' I have a lot of respect for him now because he saw that. It was a move that had to be made for me to be able to continue playing baseball. I'm very thankful for it."

=== Colorado Rockies (2006–2007) ===
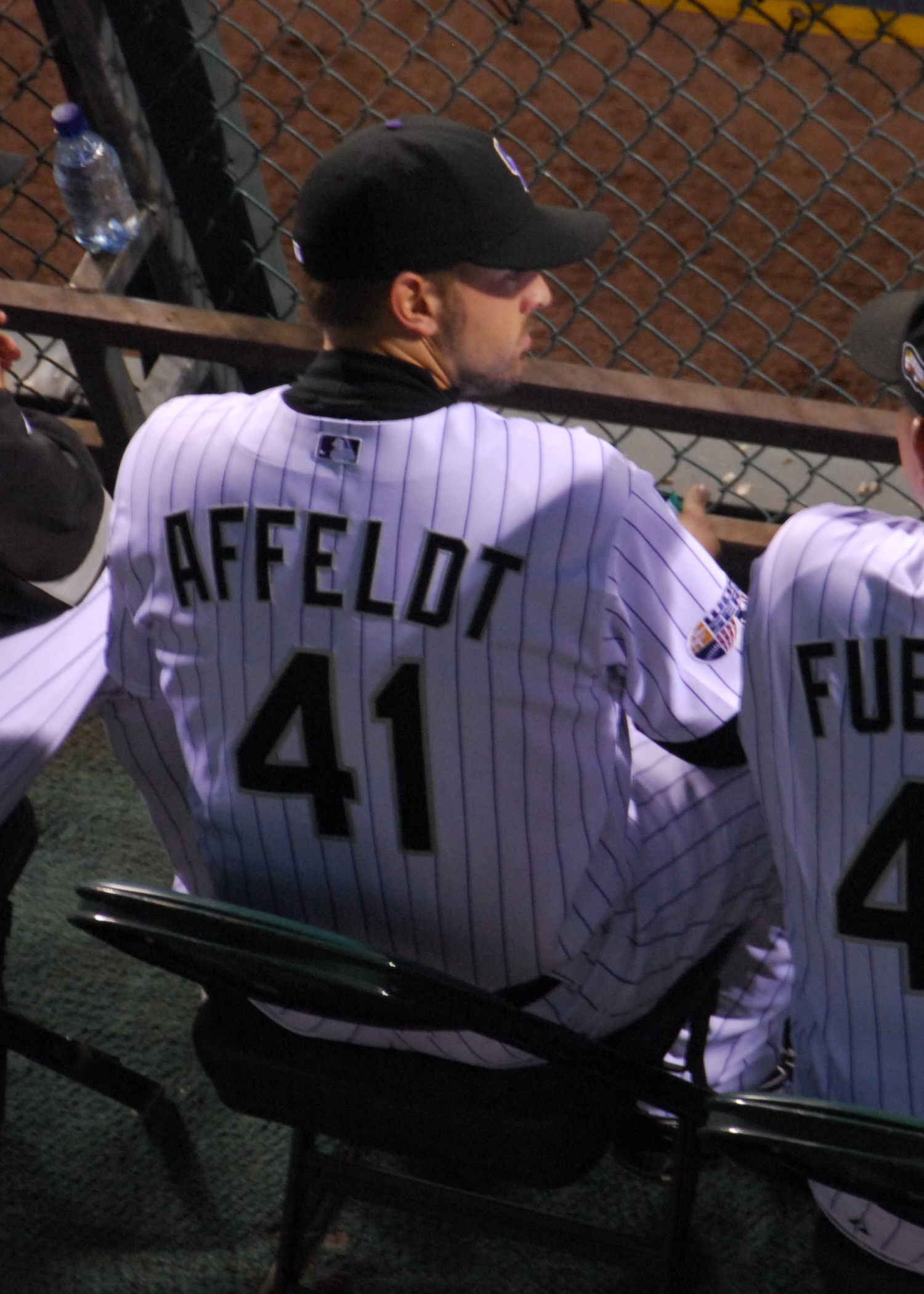
Affeldt sitting next to Brian Fuentes while with the Rockies in 2007.

With the Rockies, Affeldt was used exclusively out of the bullpen. He got his only save of the season on September 19 in a 12–4 win over the San Francisco Giants. Affeldt finished the 2006 season with a 6.20 ERA in fifty–nine games.

Affeldt spent the entire 2007 season in the bullpen, where he was used as a lefty specialist. Affeldt had a 2.51 ERA through his first fifty–six games of the year. He did not give up a home run until Pete Laforest hit one off of him in an 11–9 loss to the San Diego Padres on August 16. He struggled at the end of the year, with a 7.30 ERA in his final nineteen games. He still finished the year 4–3, with a 3.51 ERA in seventy-five games, and the Rockies made the playoffs as the NL Wild Card. He made his postseason debut on October 4 in the Division Series against the Philadelphia Phillies and gave up one run (on a home run by Ryan Howard) in one inning in a 10–5 win by Colorado. The Rockies swept the series to advance to the Championship Series against the Arizona Diamondbacks. In the first game, Affeldt entered with two outs and the bases loaded with the Rockies leading 5–1. He retired Stephen Drew to help the Rockies win 5–1. The Rockies swept the Diamondbacks to meet the Boston Red Sox in the World Series. Affeldt pitched in all four games of the World Series without giving up a run, but the Rockies were swept by the Red Sox. Affeldt became a free agent after the season.

=== Cincinnati Reds (2008) ===
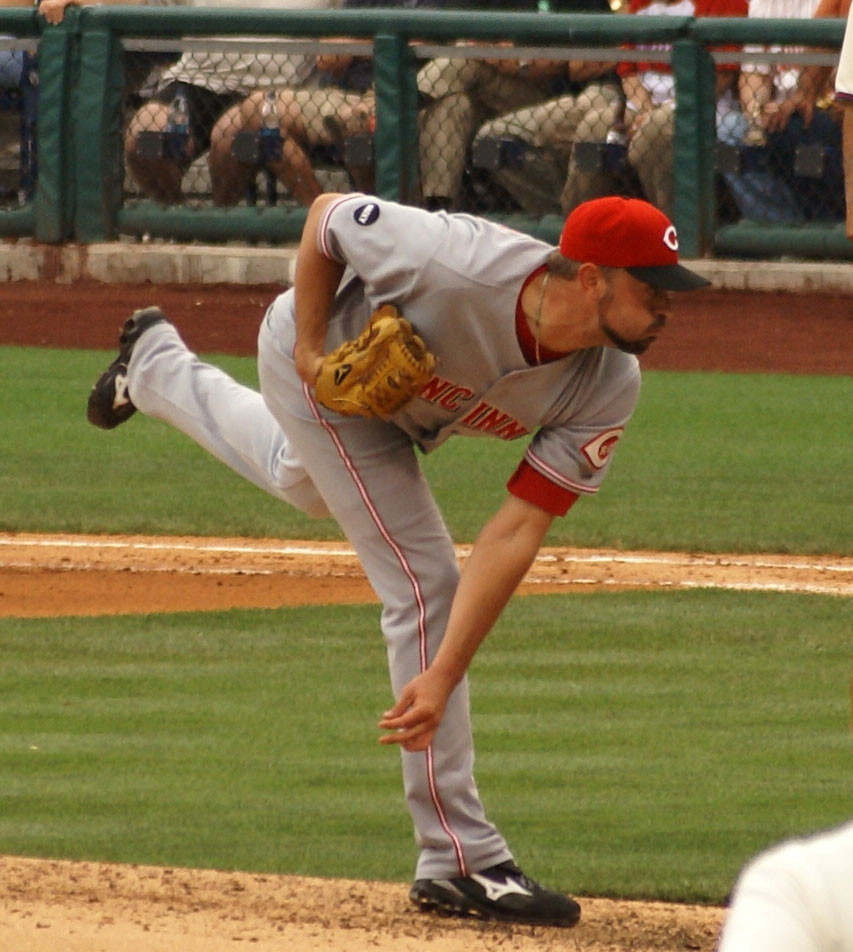
Affeldt pitching for the Reds in 2008.

Affeldt was signed to a one–year deal by the Cincinnati Reds on January 23, 2008, to compete for a spot in the starting rotation. He said of signing and competing to start, "My heart skipped a beat when they offered that deal. I went with my heart there." However, he was placed in the bullpen, where he stayed for the entire year. He won his first game as a Red when the Reds beat the Arizona Diamondbacks 6–5 on April 2. He made the three hundredth appearance of his career on May 2 in a 2–0 loss to the Atlanta Braves. His only other decision of the year came on September 3 when he was the losing pitcher in a 6–5 loss to the Pittsburgh Pirates.

Affeldt finished the 2008 season with a 3.33 ERA in seventy–four games. He was also one of only five NL relievers to pitch seventy-five innings and average one strikeout per inning, along with Joel Hanrahan, Aaron Heilman, Hong-Chih Kuo, and Carlos Mármol. Following the season, Affeldt again became a free agent.

=== San Francisco Giants (2009–2015) ===
==== 2009 ====
On November 17, 2008, Affeldt signed a two–year deal with the San Francisco Giants. He said of signing with them, "With that starting rotation, the bullpen won't get burned out." Affeldt immediately began having a career year with the Giants. He was used on Opening Day against the Milwaukee Brewers, and he pitched a scoreless inning in the Giants' 10–6 win. On April 12, he entered a game against the Padres with one out and the bases loaded in the sixth inning. Affeldt got Brian Giles to ground into a double play to end the inning, but he gave up two runs (one earned) in the seventh as the Padres won 6–1.

From May 8 through July 24, Affeldt had a twenty–eight inning scoreless streak. During the streak, on May 15, he struck out a season–high four batters in an 8–6 loss to the Mets. On May 31, he entered a game against St. Louis with runners on first and third and Albert Pujols on deck in the eighth, and he struck out Joe Thurston to end the inning and help the Giants win 5–3. The streak did not end until July 28, when Brandon Medders allowed one of Affeldt's runners to score in a game against Pittsburgh. On August 2, with runners on first and second with one out in the eighth inning against the Philadelphia Phillies, he retired Chase Utley and Ryan Howard to help the Giants win 7–3. He won the final game of the season against San Diego by pitching two scoreless innings as the Giants won 4–3 in ten innings. Affeldt finished the season with a career best 1.73 ERA in seventy–four games. He was named tenth on one writer's ballot for MVP voting, placing him in a tie for twenty–eighth on the list. On December 17, he won the This Year in Baseball Setup Man of the Year Award.

==== 2010 ====
In 2010, Affeldt again spent the entire season in the bullpen for the Giants. On March 28, the Giants extended his contract through the 2011 season with an option for 2012. Affeldt picked up his first save with the Giants in a 6–3 victory over the Atlanta Braves on April 11. He struggled for most of the season and was placed on the disabled list on July 24 with an oblique strain. After rehabbing in the minors, Affeldt returned to the Giants on August 18. He finished the season with four saves and a 4.14 ERA in fifty–three games.

Despite his struggles, Affeldt was named to the Giants' playoff roster. Affeldt made his first playoff appearance for the Giants in Game 2 of the 2010 NLCS against Philadelphia. He struck out one batter and intentionally walked another one, but Santiago Casilla allowed him to score as the Giants lost 6–1. Affeldt faced (and retired) one batter in Game 5, but the Phillies won that game 4–2. In Game 6, Affeldt entered the game in the third inning with runners on first and second and nobody out after starting pitcher Jonathan Sánchez was taken out early. He pitched two hitless, scoreless innings, and the Giants won the game 3–2 to advance to the World Series. The Giants won very close games in 2010 which were described by many as torture, which became a theme for the 2010 Giants. "We're all the wildcats and misfits and people nobody wanted." Affeld said. "We're all unique individuals. We have some crazies in this clubhouse. But that is who we are. We compete because of it, and we win close games because of it." Affeldt pitched in two games in the World Series, which the Giants won in five games to give Affeldt his first World Series ring.

==== 2011 ====
Affeldt returned to the Giants in 2011 and posted a solid season, going 3–2 with a 2.63 ERA in 67 appearances, including 3 saves. In addition, he posted a career best WHIP of 1.151. Left-handed batters hit only .144 off of Affeldt in 2011. On September 8, 2011, Affeldt suffered a season-ending injury as he gashed his non-throwing (right) hand trying to separate frozen hamburger patties and underwent surgery to address nerve damage. After the season, the Giants picked up Affeldt's $5 million contract option for the 2012 season.

==== 2012 ====
On May 1, 2012, Affeldt suffered another off-the-field injury, spraining the MCL in his right knee while picking up his four-year-old son. The injury was listed as number two on an ESPN list of strangest injuries, and was named Jayson Stark's "Strangest But Truest Injury of the Year". Affeldt finished the regular season 1–2 with a 2.70 ERA in 67 appearances in 63 1/3 innings.

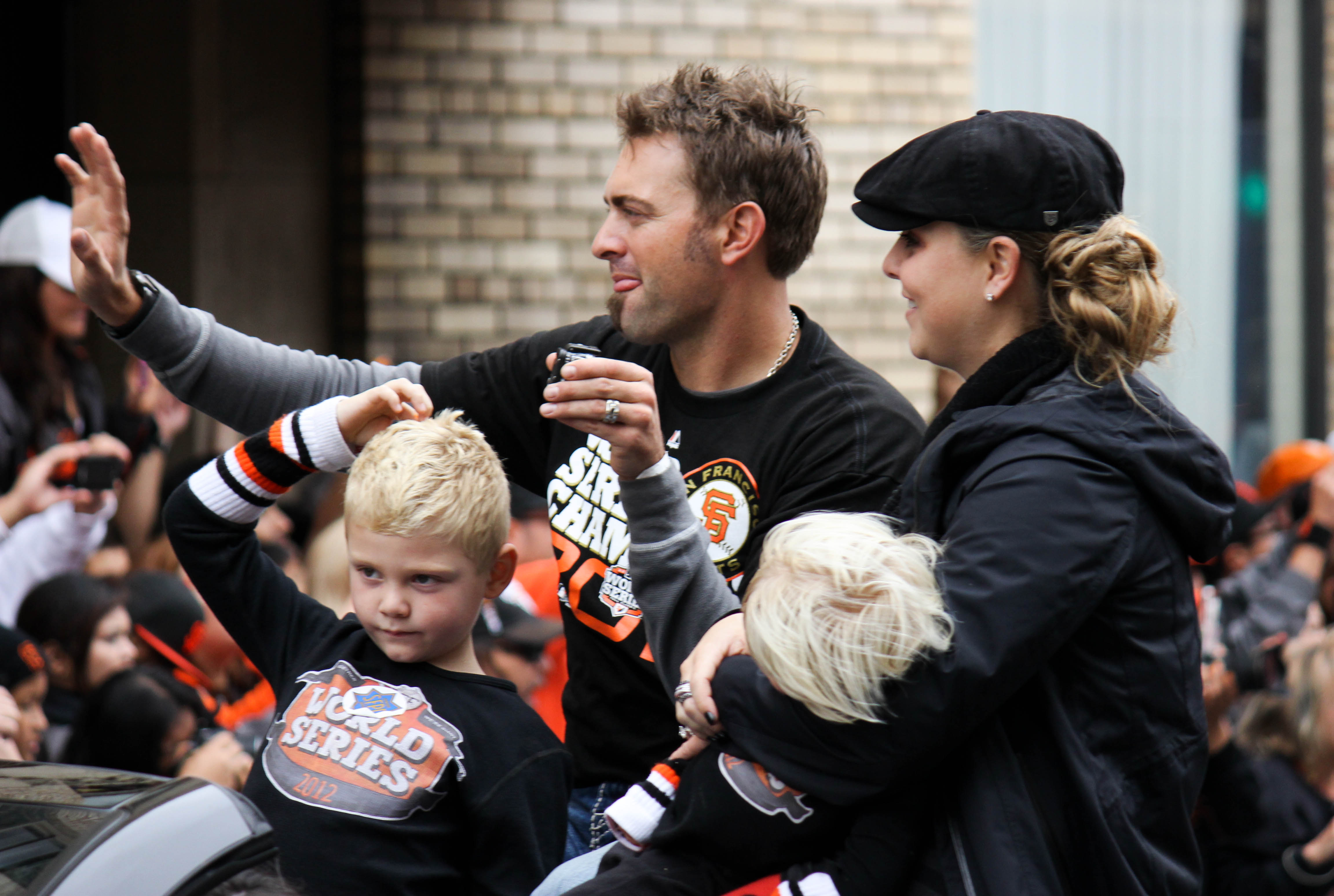
Affeldt with his family at the 2012 World Series victory parade

In the 2012 postseason, Affeldt appeared in 10 games, pitching 10 1/3 innings, allowing 5 hits and 3 walks against 10 strikeouts and no runs. In Game 4 of the 2012 World Series, Affeldt provided key relief, striking out Detroit Tigers power hitters Miguel Cabrera, Prince Fielder, and Delmon Young in the eighth inning to preserve a 3–3 tie. The Giants would go on to win the game in the tenth inning, completing a sweep of the Tigers, earning Affeldt his second World Series ring. On November 13, 2012, Affeldt signed a three-year, $18 million contract to remain with the Giants through the 2015 season.

==== 2013 ====
Affeldt struggled with injury in 2013, recording a 3.74 ERA in 33 2/3 innings pitched. He went on the 15-day disabled list after suffering a right oblique strain on April 14. Given Affeldt's history of unusual injuries, Giants broadcaster Jon Miller joked that Affeldt suffered the injury during a sneezing fit. Affeldt clarified that he suffered the injury while pitching the night before in Chicago. He missed 50 games between July 21 and September 12 with a left groin strain. After returning for one game in September, Affeldt was shut down for the rest of the season.

==== 2014 ====
Affeldt started the 2014 season on the disabled list with a strained MCL in his right knee. Appearing in 62 games, Affeldt recorded a 2.28 ERA with 41 strikeouts and 14 walks.

In Game 5 of the 2014 NLCS against the St. Louis Cardinals, Affeldt entered the game in the top of the ninth with two outs and the bases loaded, retiring Oscar Taveras (in what would be his final career at bat) on a comebacker to preserve a 3–3 tie. Affeldt was credited with the win when Travis Ishikawa hit a walk-off home run in the bottom of the ninth to clinch the pennant for the Giants.

Affeldt earned the win in Game 7 of the 2014 World Series against his first Major League team the Kansas City Royals. Affeldt was brought in from the bullpen in the 2nd inning and pitched 2 1/3 innings of scoreless baseball before giving way to series MVP Madison Bumgarner, who finished the game. On getting the Game 7 win at Kauffman Stadium, where he started his career, Affeldt said, "To be able to do it in Kansas City, with my past history, it just means a lot to me. It means my end was better than my beginning."

In the 2014 postseason, Affeldt pitched in 11 games, allowing just 5 hits and no runs over 11 2/3 innings. Affeldt entered games in seven different innings and pitched in nine different innings overall, from the 2nd through the 10th. Affeldt is the winning pitcher in the clinching games of the LCS and World Series in the same postseason.

Through three postseasons with the Giants, Affeldt recorded 22 consecutive scoreless outings, a streak bettered only by Mariano Rivera (23).

==== 2015 ====
Affeldt struggled with injury and inconsistency in 2015. By late June, he had a 5.96 ERA and allowed five home runs, more than he allowed from 2012 to 2014 combined. He was placed on the disabled list with a left shoulder strain on June 26. Affeldt returned July 22, but on August 24, he suffered another off-the-field injury, a left knee subluxation, while spending time at a lake with his family on an off-day.

On October 1, 2015, Affeldt announced he would retire after the 2015 season, making him the first member of the "Cour Four" out of the bullpen to retire. On October 4, 2015 at AT&T Park, before the conclusion of Fan Appreciation Day and Weekend, the Giants honored Affeldt with a pregame retirement ceremony surrounded by his family, friends, Giants teammates, coaches, and executives. The ceremony included speeches from president and chief executive officer Larry Baer, manager Bruce Bochy, and starting pitcher Matt Cain, before Affeldt emotionally addressed the crowd. "...I'm going to return home to Spokane, but I can promise you that I'm never going to leave this city," Affeldt said as he was wrapping up his 15 minute 27 second speech. He made his final Major League appearance out of the bullpen later that day, pitching 0 2/3 innings and retiring the only two hitters he faced. Bochy made a pitching change, allowing Affeldt to receive a standing ovation from his family, friends, and Giants announcers, coaches, executives, fans, and teammates as he walked off the mound. As he walked down the steps into the dugout, he was greeted and embraced by all of his teammates and coaches. The event and game was broadcast live on local television on Comcast SportsNet Bay Area.

== Career overall ==
=== Statistics and achievements ===
Category	W	L	ERA	G	GS	CG	SHO	SV	IP	H	R	ER	HR	BB	IBB	SO	HBP	ERA+	FIP	WHIP	H/9	SO/9	Ref.
Total	43	46	3.97	774	42	0	0	28	926.0	904	455	408	76	396	41	720	42	110	4.01	1.404	8.8	7.0	

== Broadcasting career ==
After retiring as a player, Affeldt joined CSN Bay Area as a studio analyst for Giants Pregame Live and Giants Postgame Live for the 2016 season. Affeldt also rejoined the Giants organization as a community ambassador. In mid-September 2016, during game radio broadcasts on KNBR, he provided commentary and opinion on-air with alternating Giants broadcasters, as regulars Jon Miller and Dave Flemming were away 'on assignment'. In February 2017 it was announced that Affeldt, along with Javier López, would be serving as fill-in color analysts on Giants telecasts during the 2017 season, due to regular analyst Mike Krukow reducing his schedule. Affeldt was not brought back as an analyst for 2018.

== Pitching style ==
Affeldt had three different kinds of pitches: a sinking fastball (which is rare for a lefty), a curveball, and a split. His fastball travelled in the low nineties, and while his curveball was not fast, it had late breaking action and got a lot of swing-throughs. Affeldt induced groundballs at a high rate with his sinking fastball and could also get the strikeout when the situation called for it.

== Personal life ==
During his playing career, Affeldt and his family lived in Spokane, Washington. As of 2022, Affeldt, his wife Candace, and family reside in the town of Boerne, Texas, just outside of San Antonio. He is also the CEO and co-founder of Free Roam Brewing Company, a craft brewery in Boerne which opened in 2022.

Affeldt is a devout Christian and a strong advocate for ending child poverty. He writes a weekly blog about his Christian faith and his desire to stir a movement in the cause of helping the suffering and marginalized.

== Activism ==
=== Philanthropy ===
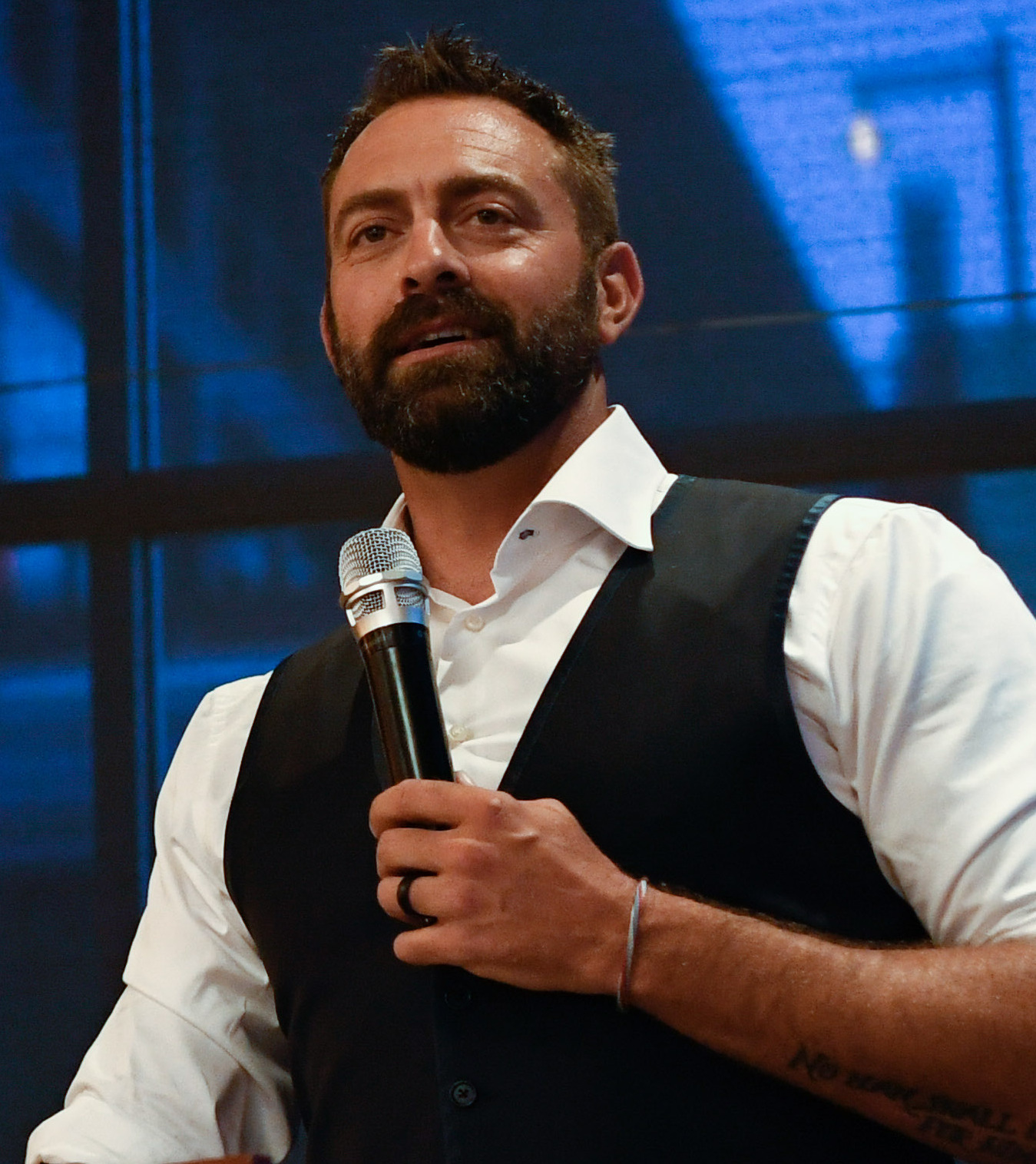
Affeldt speaking in 2023

In October 2010, during a visit to a Bay Area elementary school alongside former Giants pitcher Juan Marichal, Affeldt told the students, "I try to make sure everybody, all the young people in the world, also have a chance to dream really big." In 2009, Affeldt donated $5,000 to the Not For Sale campaign for opening a medical clinic in Thailand for former child slaves. He also became a prominent member of Not For Sale's Free2Play campaign, pledging a $100 donation for every strikeout and recruiting other professional athletes, including his teammate Matt Cain and the St. Louis Cardinals' Matt Holliday. In addition, Affeldt has lent his support as a spokesperson for Larkin Street Youth Services, a San Francisco non-profit that provides services to young people experiencing homelessness.

In 2009, Affeldt was recognized for his anti–slavery efforts by a nomination for the Jefferson Award for Public Service, and in 2010, he was the San Francisco Giants' nominee for the Roberto Clemente Award. Affeldt also founded an organization known as Generation Alive that exists to develop a generation of young leaders, committed to serving others and responding to the needs in their community. In 2013, Affeldt released a book entitled To Stir a Movement: Life, Justice, and Major League Baseball. In the book, Affeldt recounted a contract situation in 2010 where he voluntarily returned $500,000 to the Giants after discovering a clerical error. In 2015, Affeldt received an honorary degree from Whitworth University for his humanitarian efforts.
