= Not For Sale (organization) =

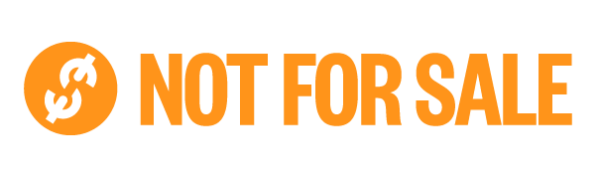
- Founded: 2007
- Founder: David Batstone, Mark Wexler
- Type: Nonprofit organization
- Purpose: Human trafficking, modern slavery, environmental exploitation
- Location: San Francisco, California, United States
- Method: Enterprise-driven solutions, social enterprise
- Website: wearenotforsale.org

Not For Sale is an American nonprofit organization that combats human trafficking, modern slavery, and environmental exploitation through enterprise-driven solutions. Founded in 2007 by David Batstone and Mark Wexler in San Francisco, California, the organization operates projects across multiple countries in the Americas, Europe, Africa, and Asia.

While Not For Sale remains a registered charity, it deploys a multi-legal platform that includes nonprofits, for-profit enterprises, cooperatives, and foundations, using whatever combination of legal structures a given problem demands. The organization's model has produced several independently notable initiatives, including the beverage company REBBL, the Amsterdam restaurant group Dignita, the consumer supply chain transparency app Free2Work, and the anti-trafficking sports initiative Free2Play.

Not For Sale has been featured by CNN, Forbes, Fast Company, USA Today, VICE, CNBC, Stanford Social Innovation Review, MarketWatch, and Voice of America. USA Today featured the organization alongside Facebook, Google, and Salesforce as an example of technology's new entrepreneurial approach to philanthropy. The organization received an Anthem Awards Silver in 2025.

== History ==
=== Founding ===
Not For Sale was established in 2007 by David Batstone, a professor of ethics at the University of San Francisco, and Mark Wexler, a social entrepreneur. Batstone's 2007 book Not For Sale: The Return of the Global Slave Trade — and How We Can Fight It had drawn international attention to human trafficking after Batstone discovered that staff at a restaurant near his home in the San Francisco Bay Area were victims of a trafficking ring.

While researching the book, Batstone traveled to Thailand's Golden Triangle, where he met Kru Nam, an artist and activist who had been rescuing stateless and trafficked children near the borders of Thailand, Laos, and Myanmar. Batstone committed to help build her a house for the children she had rescued. He and Wexler subsequently raised funds to construct the first shelter, an encounter that became a founding catalyst for Not For Sale.

=== The Montara Circle ===
The Montara Circle is a convening methodology developed by Not For Sale co-founders David Batstone and Mark Wexler. Named for the location of its first gathering, it involves bringing together a diverse group of entrepreneurs, technologists, investors, and practitioners, presenting them with a specific social problem, guiding them through structured exercises, and committing to act on the outcome.

==== Montara Circle I (2011) ====
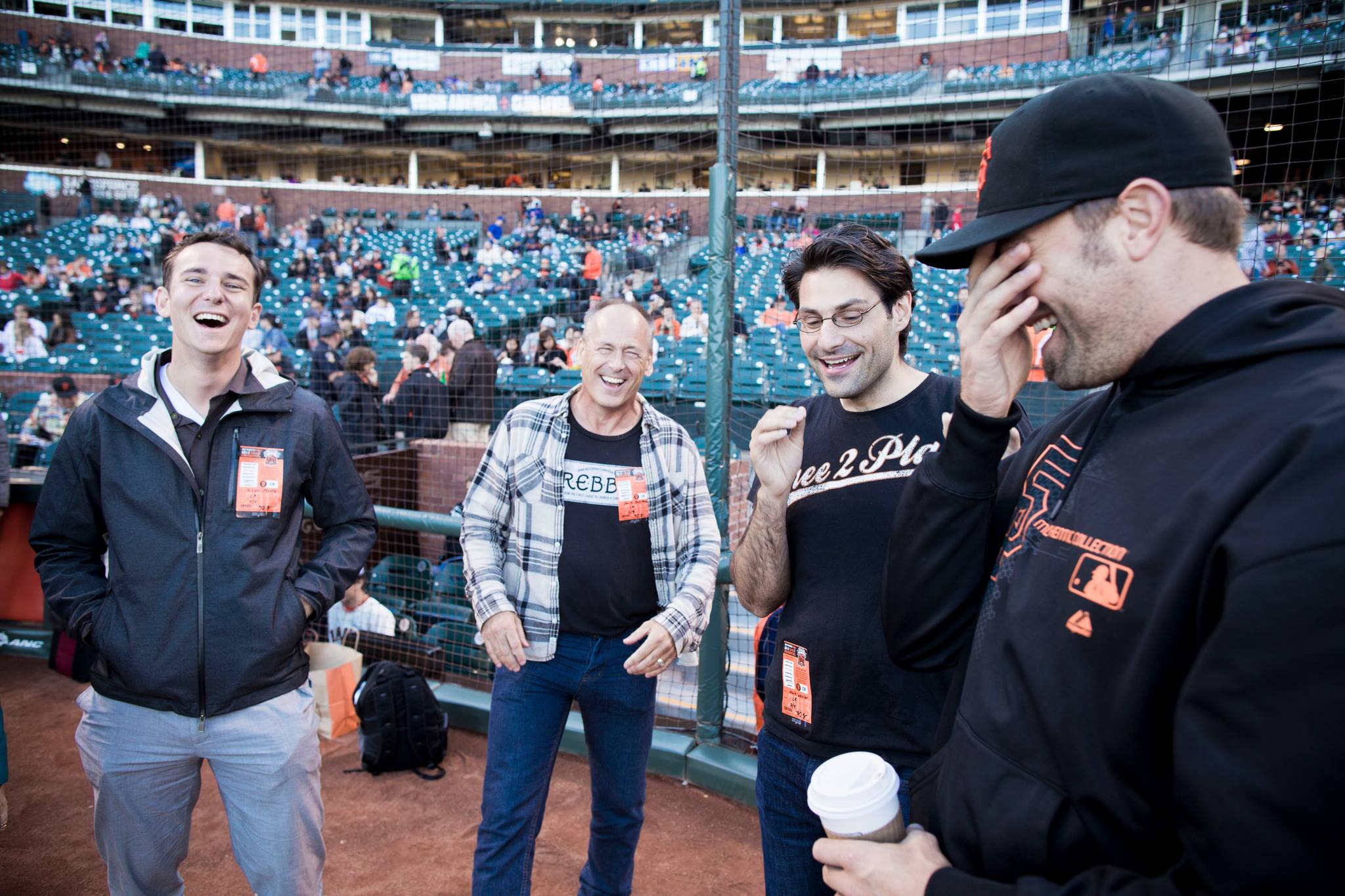
David Batstone, Mark Wexler, and Jeremy Affeldt at the first Montara Circle, 2011

The first Montara Circle was held in February 2011 in Montara, California. Approximately fifty participants were invited, drawn deliberately from outside the anti-trafficking world: entrepreneurs, technologists, investors, media executives, and athletes. The brief was to develop a viable commercial solution to human trafficking in Peru's Amazon rainforest. Participants were led through a series of exercises over two days, culminating in a group vote on the best concept. Batstone and Wexler committed publicly to the group that they would build whatever idea won.

The winning concept was a beverage company. That company became REBBL.

==== Montara Circle Amsterdam (2012) ====
In 2012, Not For Sale organized the Montara Circle Amsterdam, a convening of entrepreneurs, investors, and social enterprise leaders focused on developing enterprise solutions to human trafficking in Europe. The event produced the concept for what became the HOME enterprise -- the soup program and outreach initiative in Amsterdam's Red Light District that ultimately became Dignita.

=== Global Forum on Human Trafficking ===
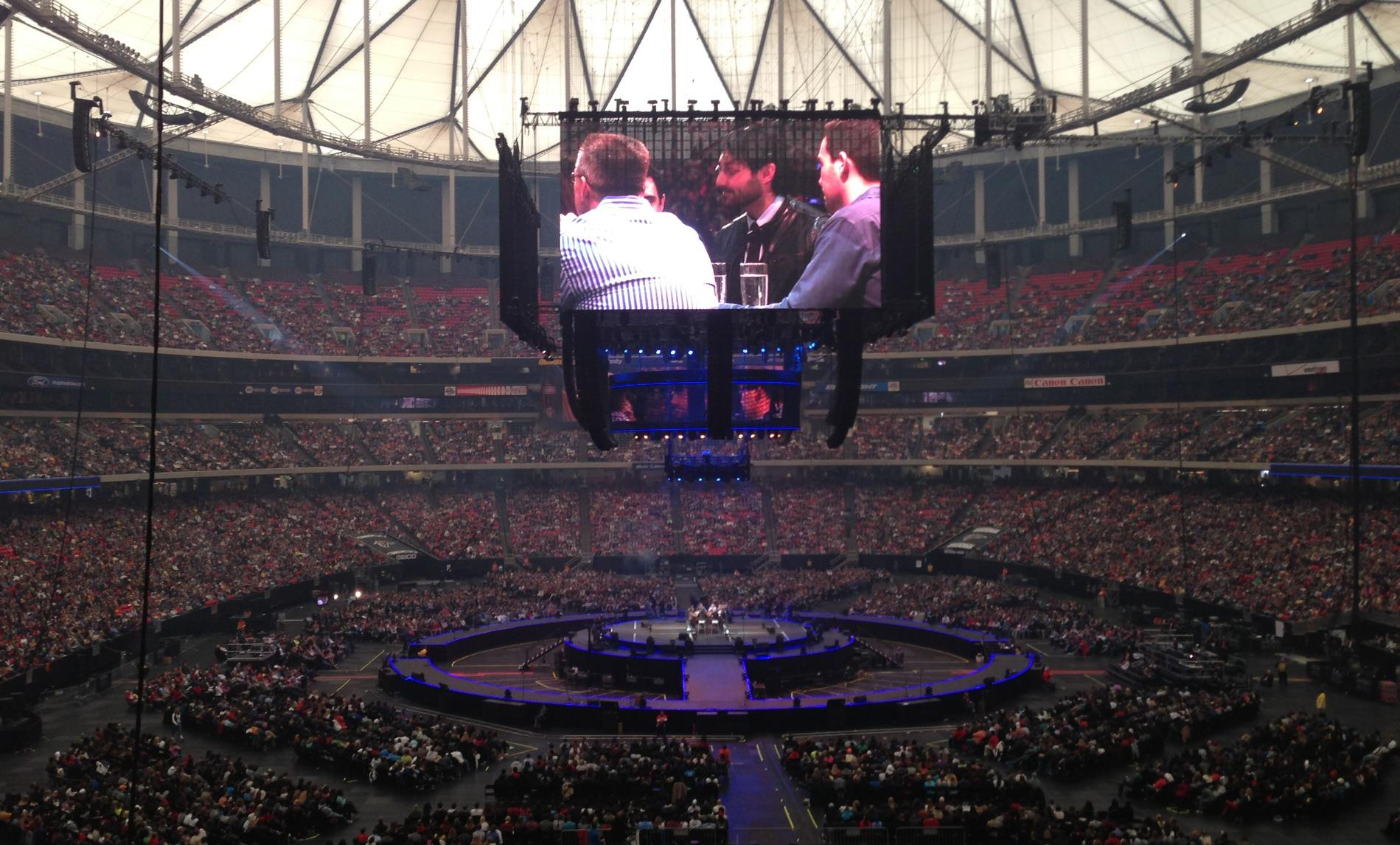
Mark Wexler speaking at Passion Conference, Atlanta, 2013

Not For Sale hosted the Global Forum on Human Trafficking from 2009 to 2014, an annual convening that drew between 600 and 1,100 attendees. The forum convened activists, entrepreneurs, policymakers, law enforcement, and survivors to address modern slavery through cross-sector collaboration.

Notable participants in the Global Forum series included Jack Dorsey, co-founder of Twitter; Matt Mahan, future Mayor of San Jose; Cecilia Flores-Oebanda, a leading Filipino anti-trafficking practitioner; musician Aloe Blacc; and Archbishop Desmond Tutu, who delivered a special message to the Global Forum.

During this same period, the organization operated the Not For Sale Academy (2008-2014), a training program that equipped participants to become active members of the anti-trafficking movement.

=== Pivot to enterprise ===
The organization's approach evolved significantly when its founders recognized that traditional shelter-based interventions, while helping individual survivors, did not address the systemic economic conditions that produced trafficking. In a 2016 HuffPost essay, Wexler wrote that the organization's approach shifted from direct services toward building economic platforms that give people options. In a 2015 article for The B Team, Wexler argued that enterprise-driven models offered a more sustainable path to addressing modern slavery than traditional approaches alone.

Rather than abandoning its nonprofit status, the organization adopted what its founders describe as a multi-legal platform: deploying nonprofits, for-profit enterprises, cooperatives, and foundations in whatever combination a given problem demands. This approach produced a diverse portfolio of ventures including REBBL (a for-profit beverage company), Dignita (a self-sustaining social enterprise restaurant), FAIR (a social enterprise accountancy firm), AFIMAD (an indigenous cooperative), and Baan Kru Nam (a children's village).

== Programs and ventures ==
=== REBBL ===
In February 2011, Not For Sale organized the Montara Circle, a two-day convening of approximately fifty entrepreneurs, technologists, and investors tasked with developing a commercial solution to human trafficking in Peru's Amazon rainforest. The event produced the concept for REBBL (Roots, Extracts, Berries, Bark and Leaves), a plant-based beverage company that would source ingredients from indigenous communities vulnerable to trafficking and return a percentage of its revenue to Not For Sale.

REBBL was incubated by Not For Sale and co-founded by Batstone and Wexler, who recruited product designer and beverage industry executive Palo Hawken to serve as founding CEO. The company sources Brazil nuts from indigenous communities in Peru's Madre de Dios Region in the Amazon rainforest, where it works with AFIMAD, a cooperative of ten indigenous communities.

The company raised $20 million in funding from CAVU Venture Partners in 2018, with previous funding from PowerPlant Ventures and BIGR Ventures. Sheryl O'Loughlin, former CEO of Clif Bar and co-founder of Plum Organics, served as CEO. The company was named a Fast Company World Changing Ideas Finalist in the Social Justice category in 2019.

In 2020, REBBL produced REBBL With a Cause, a 35-minute documentary narrated by actress Ruby Rose, which received a Fast Company World Changing Ideas Honorable Mention. In September 2023, REBBL announced it had surpassed $1 million in cumulative donations to Not For Sale. In 2022, REBBL was acquired by SYSTM Foods.

=== Dignita ===
In 2012, Not For Sale Netherlands began a culinary training program for trafficking survivors in Amsterdam, starting with a soup-making program for at-risk individuals residing in safe houses. In 2015, this model was scaled up with the opening of Dignita, a brunch café in Amsterdam, alongside the Dignita Academy, a vocational job skills training program.

CNN featured Dignita in a 2016 report, noting that 162 trainees had participated in the program and that graduates gained both professional certification and community belonging that helped overcome past trauma. VICE profiled the program in a piece about survivors making soup in Amsterdam's Red Light District. Paste Magazine described the initiative as helping survivors of human trafficking one meal at a time.

Within the Dignita Academy, participants receive training in professional cooking and barista skills as well as life skills including citizenship, administration, computing, and language qualifications. Dignita currently operates from its Hoftuin location in Amsterdam, with all profits reinvested into Not For Sale Netherlands programs.

=== FAIR ===
Not For Sale Netherlands also established FAIR, a social enterprise providing accountancy and administration support services. FAIR was created as an additional pathway for trafficking survivors to develop professional skills in business administration, complementing the hospitality training offered through Dignita.

=== Free2Work ===
In 2011, Not For Sale launched Free2Work, a consumer-facing mobile application. The app allowed users to scan product barcodes and receive grades on forced labor and child labor in the supply chains behind those products, rating companies on an A-to-F scale.

Stanford Social Innovation Review covered the app as a tool for conscious consumers. Fast Company profiled it under the headline "Find the Child Slaves Hiding in the Grocery Store." The USC Annenberg Center on Communication Leadership & Policy included Free2Work in its Technology and Human Trafficking project. The Johns Hopkins School of Advanced International Studies included it in a report on 100 Best Practices in Combating Trafficking in Persons. Fashion brand Eileen Fisher cited Free2Work in its supply chain transparency commitments.

Free2Work's A-to-F grading methodology was subsequently adopted by Baptist World Aid Australia, which has published the Ethical Fashion Report annually since 2013, assessing hundreds of fashion brands on labor standards and supply chain ethics.

=== Free2Play ===
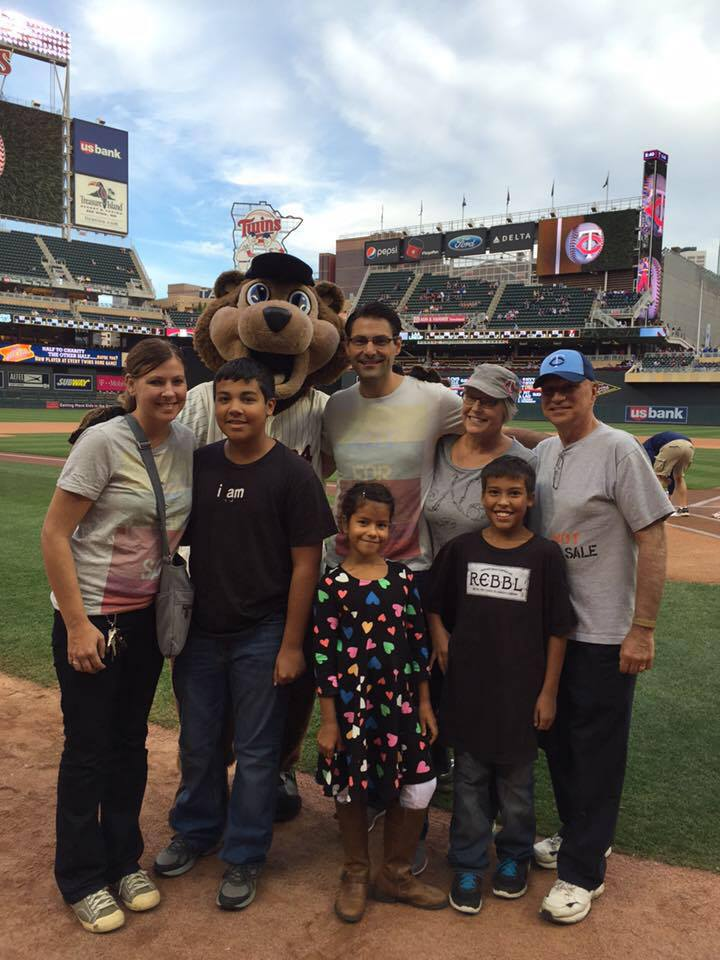
Not For Sale Free2Play initiative with MLB players

Not For Sale developed Free2Play, a sports-based anti-trafficking awareness initiative. CNN Pressroom reported in 2012 on Major League Baseball players joining the campaign to fight modern-day slavery. HuffPost profiled the initiative's connection between professional sports and anti-trafficking advocacy. Participants included San Francisco Giants pitcher Jeremy Affeldt and Los Angeles Dodgers first baseman Adrian Gonzalez.

=== Baan Kru Nam (Thailand) ===
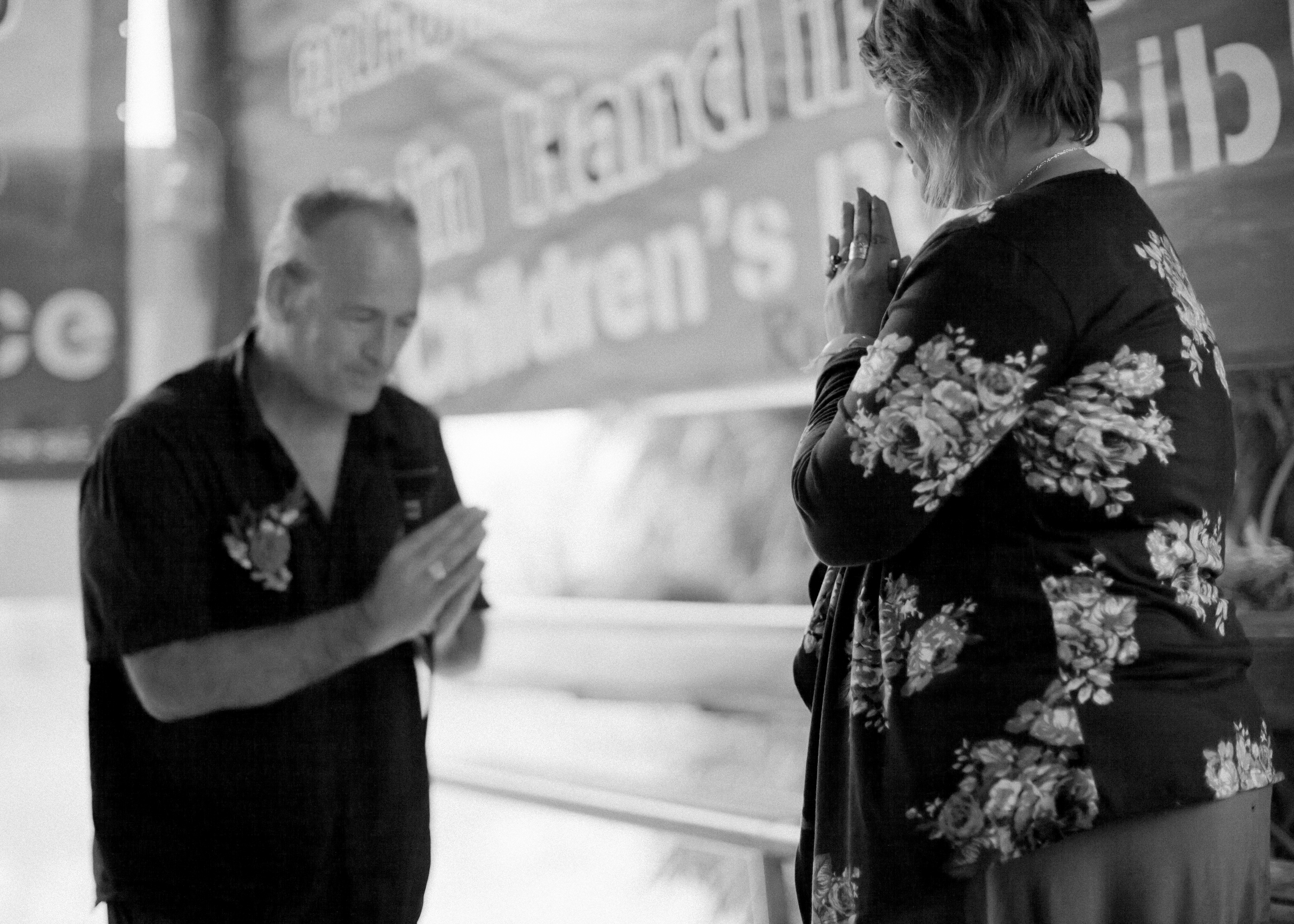
David Batstone with Kru Nam in Northern Thailand

Not For Sale Thailand operates Baan Kru Nam, a children's village in Northern Thailand directed by Kru Nam. The program provides shelter, education, healthcare, and long-term futures for rescued and stateless children. It grew from co-founder David Batstone's encounter with Kru Nam while researching his book in the Golden Triangle. What began with 27 children has grown into a community supporting over 100 children annually through shelter, long-term housing, healthcare, food, and education.

=== Peru and AFIMAD ===
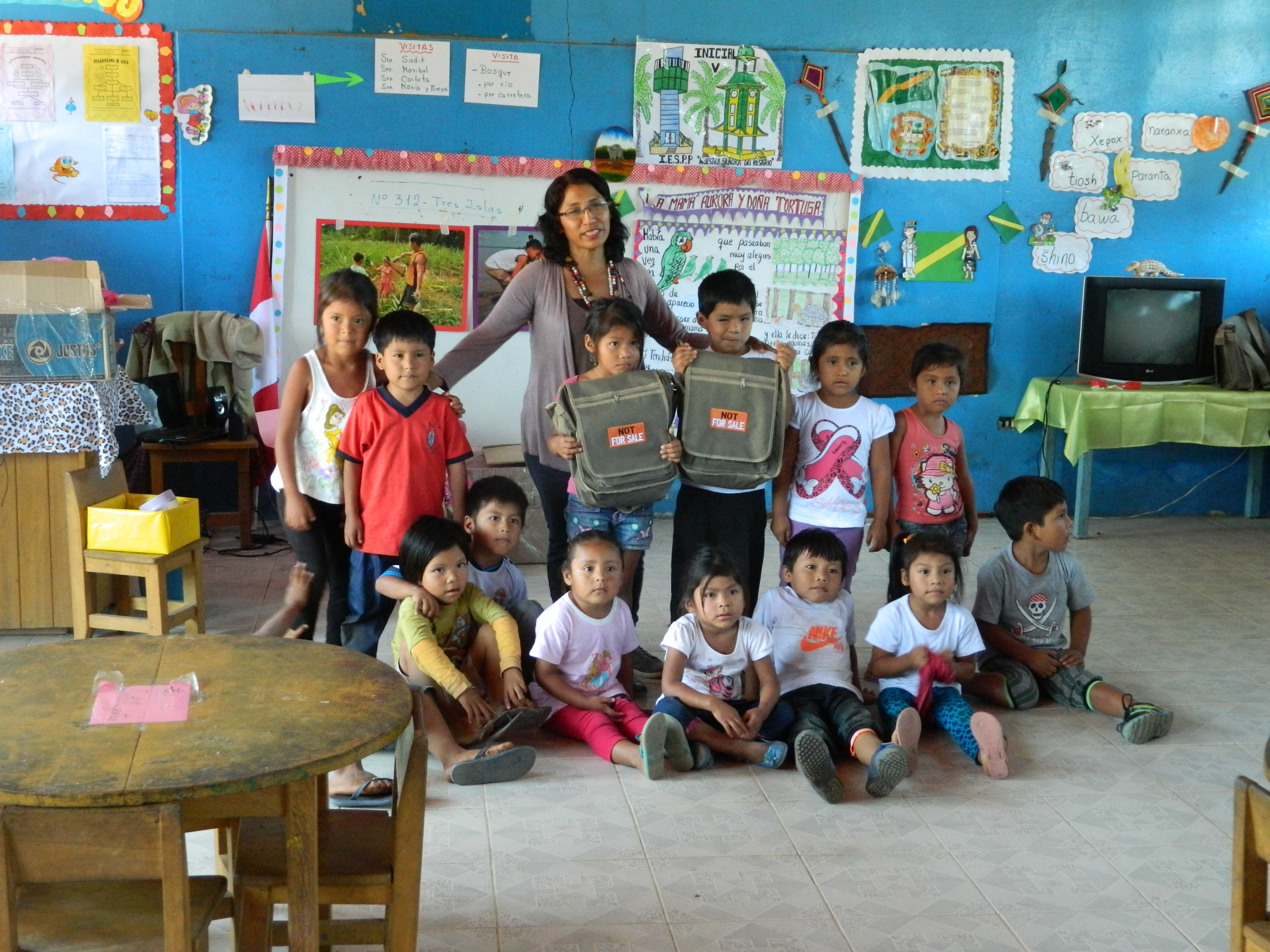
Not For Sale program, Madre de Dios, Peru

Not For Sale's work in Peru centers on the Madre de Dios Region in the Amazon rainforest. Led by Peru Director Ricardo Dawson, the organization's programs include community gardens, scholarship and educational programs, fisheries, schools, and clean water infrastructure for indigenous communities.

Not For Sale seed-funded the establishment of AFIMAD, a cooperative of ten indigenous communities in the Madre de Dios region. AFIMAD provides its member communities with collective negotiating power and fair prices for Brazil nut harvesting. Not For Sale facilitated organic and Fair Trade certification for the cooperative's products, connecting the communities directly to REBBL's commercial supply chain.

=== Regenerate Technology Global ===
Regenerate Technology Global was co-founded by David Batstone and Ted Swindells, incubated by Not For Sale, and accelerated by Just Business. The company develops next-generation lithium-ion battery recycling technology that significantly reduces water usage and environmental impact compared to conventional recycling processes. The venture was inspired by Not For Sale's work in the Amazon rainforest and East and Central Africa, where the environmental and human costs of mineral extraction are direct drivers of the exploitation the organization seeks to eliminate.

== Corporate partnerships ==
Not For Sale has maintained partnerships with several major corporations.

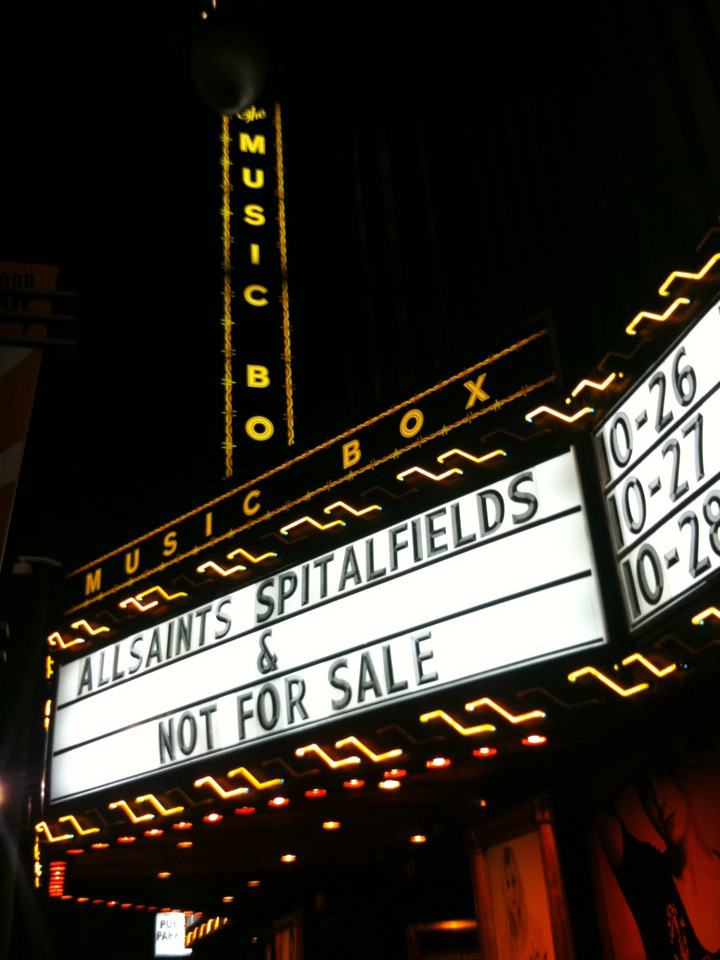
Not For Sale and AllSaints partnership launch, Los Angeles, 2011

British fashion brand AllSaints is the organization's longest-running corporate partner, with a relationship spanning over thirteen years. AllSaints embeds anti-trafficking awareness into its employee culture, sends staff to Thailand and Romania to visit projects firsthand, and references the partnership in its Modern Slavery Act statement.

Alex and Ani, the jewelry brand, collaborated with Not For Sale to create a limited-edition Queen's Charm Empowerment Bracelet collection from 2017 to 2018, with proceeds supporting anti-trafficking programs.

Eileen Fisher references Not For Sale's Free2Work methodology in its supply chain transparency and anti-trafficking commitments.

Not For Sale also partners with M2i Global (OTC: MTWO), a critical minerals company, to reinforce ethical sourcing practices in mineral supply chains.

== Just Business ==
Just Business is an international investment and incubation firm co-founded by Mark Wexler and David Batstone in 2006, operating as a sister entity to Not For Sale. While Not For Sale identifies problems and incubates early-stage ventures, Just Business accelerates them: raising venture capital, providing business and marketing support, and guiding mission-driven companies through growth stages.

Just Business has helped accelerate REBBL, Regenerate Technology Global, and other enterprise-driven ventures. Its portfolio has also included investments in Relocity, American Battery Technology Company, and Hydra Energy.

== Awards and recognition ==
- United Nations Women for Peace Association "Peace Award" (2017) -- awarded to co-founder David Batstone
- Harari Conscious Leadership and Social Innovation Prize (USF School of Management, 2017) -- awarded to David Batstone
- Anthem Awards Silver Winner (2025) -- for Not For Sale's work in the Peruvian Amazon
- Fast Company World Changing Ideas Finalist, Social Justice category (2019)
- Fast Company World Changing Ideas Honorable Mention, Media and Entertainment category (2020) for REBBL With a Cause
- Inclusion in the Johns Hopkins SAIS report on 100 Best Practices in Combating Trafficking in Persons (2012)
- Inclusion in the ICCLR (Canada) report on Promising Practices in Response to Human Trafficking (2010)
- Cited by the USC Annenberg Center's Technology and Human Trafficking project

== Publications ==
=== Books by David Batstone ===
- Not For Sale: The Return of the Global Slave Trade — and How We Can Fight It. HarperCollins, 2007 (revised 2010).
- Saving the Corporate Soul — and (Who Knows?) Maybe Your Own. Jossey-Bass, 2003.
- From Conquest to Struggle: Jesus of Nazareth in Latin America. SUNY Press, 1991 (revised 2009).

=== Books by Wexler and Batstone ===
- The Art of Being a REBBL: 10 Rules to Becoming a Changemaker (forthcoming).

== See also ==
- Human trafficking
- Modern slavery
- Social enterprise
- Fair trade
- Forced labor
- Ethical consumerism
- Impact investing
