= David Batstone =

American academic philosopher

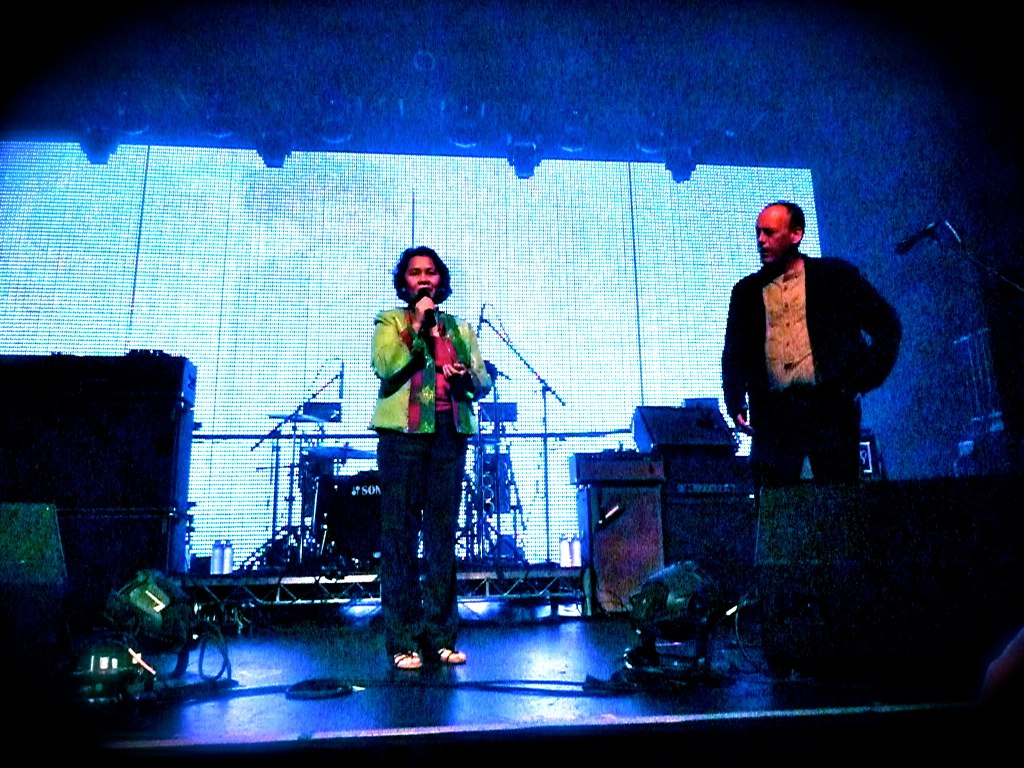
- David Batstone (right) speaking at an anti-sex trafficking event
- Born: David Bruce Batstone; April 4, 1958 (age 68); Illinois, U.S.
- Occupation: Ethics professor
- Notable work: Not for Sale, Saving the Corporate Soul
- Theological work
- Tradition or movement: liberation theology
- Main interests: Human trafficking, slavery

David Batstone (born April 4, 1958) is an ethics professor at the University of San Francisco and is the founder and president of Not For Sale, a global nonprofit organization combating human trafficking through enterprise-driven solutions.

Batstone is also a journalist and the president and founder of Right Reality, an international business that engages in social ventures. He is a leader in Central American Mission Partners, a human rights group. As a representative of this group, he met with Bono through Glide Memorial Church during A Conspiracy of Hope, a concert tour in support of Amnesty International. Before becoming a human rights activist, Batstone was a Silicon Valley venture capitalist.

== Biography ==
Batstone wrote the book Not for Sale: The Return of the Global Slave Trade - and How We Can Fight It, in which he wrote about human trafficking and how social inequality and poverty make it easy for traffickers to find girls to traffick. Julie Clawson wrote positively of this book, writing that she appreciated Batstone's "audacity in telling story after story of modern-day slavery." While still a student, Batstone studied under William R. Herzog, who taught Batstone about the parables of Jesus. Batstone is an advocate of workplace spirituality, about which he wrote in his 2003 book Saving the Corporate Soul. He is also a liberation theologian who considers postmodernity an era in which "we wallow in private affluence while squatting in public squalor." An anti-slavery activist, at the 2012 Freedom and Honor Conference in Korea, a conference about slavery and human trafficking, Batstone was one of the two keynote speakers.

In 2007, Batstone co-founded Not For Sale with Mark Wexler, building on the research and advocacy work behind his book. The organization combats human trafficking through enterprise-driven solutions, operating programs in Thailand, Peru, the Netherlands, Vietnam, and the United States. Not For Sale incubated several social ventures including REBBL, a plant-based beverage company whose supply chain supports indigenous communities in Peru's Amazon rainforest, and Dignita, a survivor-led restaurant group in Amsterdam.

Born in Illinois, Batstone graduated from Chillicothe Township High School in 1976. He then earned a B.A. degree in psychology from Westmont College in 1980. Batstone received an M.Div. degree from the International Baptist Seminary in Switzerland in 1982 and a second M.Div. degree from the Pacific School of Religion in 1984. He completed his Ph.D. degree in systematic theology at the Graduate Theological Union in 1989. His doctoral thesis in liberation theology was entitled From Conquest to Struggle: Jesus of Nazareth in the Liberation Christology of Latin America.
