= Rubryka =

Ukrainian online media outlet

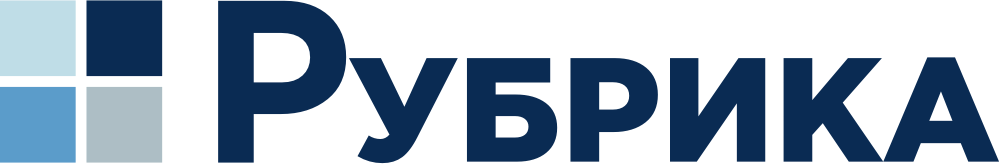
- Available in: Ukrainian; English; Russian
- Headquarters: Kyiv, {{{location_country}}}
- Creator: Anastasia Rudenko
- Website: https://rubryka.com/
- Commercial: Yes

Rubryka is a Ukrainian online media outlet that specializes in solutions journalism, and covers news and socio-political developments in Ukraine. It was founded in 2018 by its editor-in-chief Anastasia Rudenko, the only solutions journalism teacher in Ukraine, accredited by the Solutions Journalism Network. The outlet reports in Ukrainian, Russian, and English.

== Media concept and focuses ==
Since 2020, Rubryka has been reporting on Ukrainian problems and solutions, with an emphasis on solutions and constructive journalism ideals. It is a Ukrainian media outlet that focuses on solutions journalism, with its articles featured on the global solutions journalism aggregator, Solutions Story Tracker. In 2021, Rubryka launched its format for solutions stories, with the goal to "maintain excellent journalistic standards and a focus on media literacy."

The publication is recognized as a solutions media outlet, and has collaborated with organizations and global supporters of solutions journalism, including Transitions and Solutions Journalism Network, the Kyiv Investment Forum, and the International IT Forum.

== Media work during the Russian invasion of Ukraine ==
From the start of the Russian invasion of Ukraine on February 24, 2022, Rubryka has been covering stories that address problems and solutions that have arisen due to the war. The publication has also launched an English-language podcast on solutions that Ukrainians have developed to cope with the war. Rubryka updates its readers on current developments and news from Ukraine.
