= HappyNews.com =

Aggregator website

HappyNews.com was a news aggregator and website that reported only the positive side of the news. It was created by Byron Reese, who was the founder and CEO of PageWise.

In 2016, Reese re-purchased HappyNews.com with unknown intentions.

== See also ==
- Daryn Kagan
- GoodNewsNetwork
- Positive News
- Yes! (U.S. magazine)
