= National Security Archive =

American advocacy and journalism nonprofit

Coordinates: 38.9007°N 77.0463°W

The National Security Archive
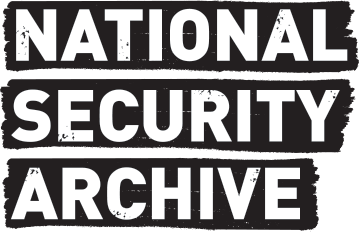
- Abbreviation: The Archive
- Formation: 1985, United States
- Type: 501(c)(3) non-profit organization
- Legal status: Foundation
- Purpose: Freedom of information, journalism, transparency, open government, research
- Headquarters: Washington, D.C., U.S.
- Website: National Security Archive National Security Archive 2 (Legacy)

The National Security Archive is an American 501(c)(3) non-governmental, non-profit research and archival institution located on the campus of the George Washington University in Washington, D.C. Founded in 1985 to check rising government secrecy, the National Security Archive is an investigative journalism center, open government advocate, international affairs research institute, and the largest repository of declassified U.S. documents outside the federal government. In the four decades of its history, the National Security Archive has spurred the declassification of more than 15 million pages of government documents by being the leading non-profit user of the U.S. Freedom of Information Act (FOIA), filing a total of more than 70,000 FOIA and declassification requests.

== Organization history and accolades ==
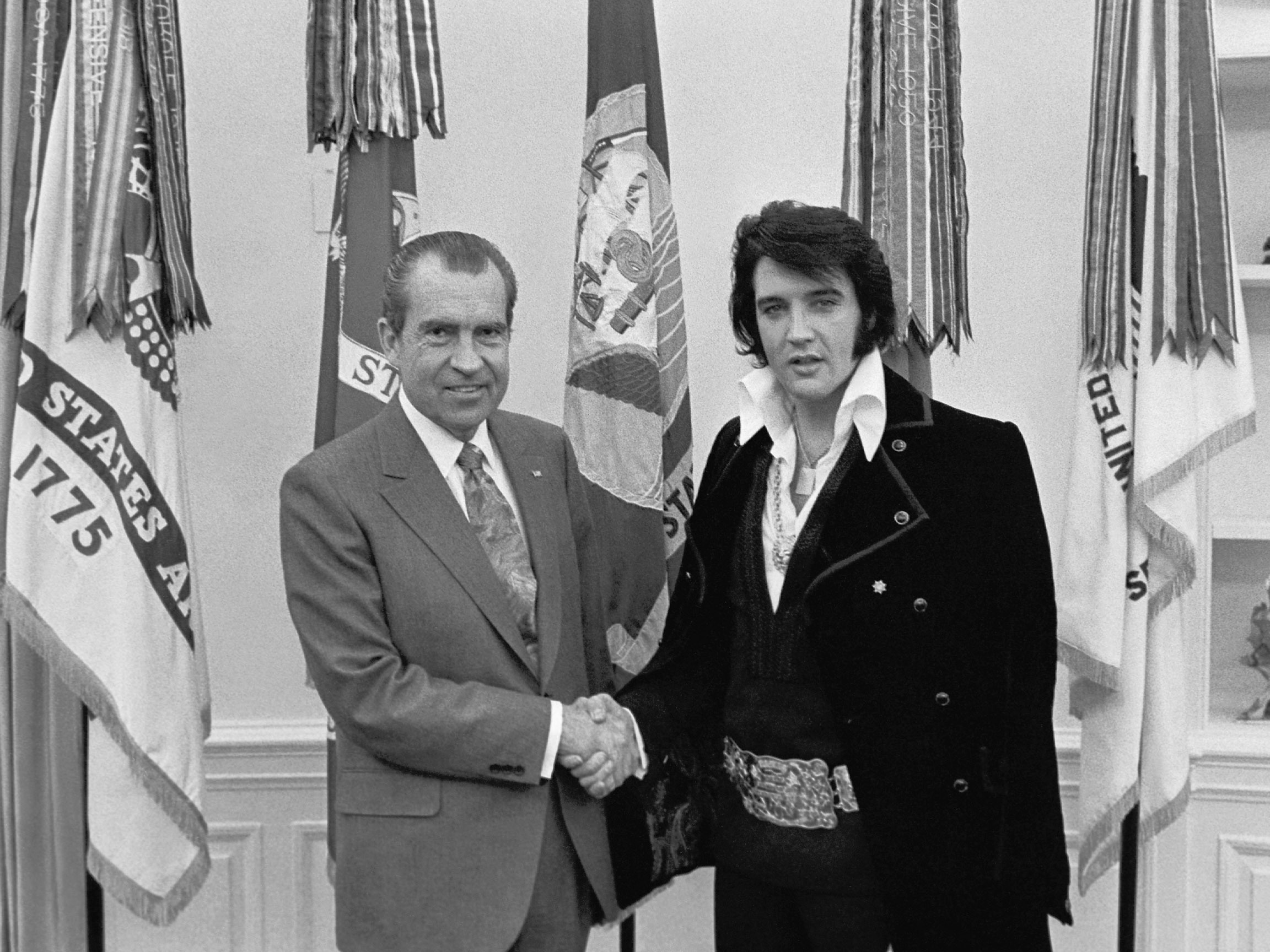
Of all the requests made each year to the U.S. National Archives, one item has been requested more than any other: the December 21, 1970, photograph of Elvis Presley and Richard M. Nixon shaking hands during Presley's visit to the White House.

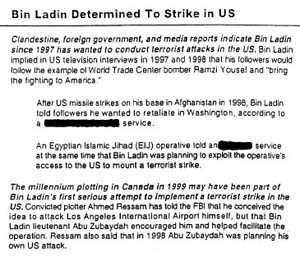
The declassified August 6, 2001, President's Daily Brief warning "Bin Laden Determined to Strike in US."

Led by founder Scott Armstrong, former Washington Post reporter and staff member of the Senate Watergate Committee, journalists and historians came together in 1985 to create the National Security Archive with the idea of enriching research and public debate about U.S. national security policy. Directed by Tom Blanton since 1992, the National Security Archive continues to challenge national security secrecy by advocating for open government, utilizing the FOIA to compel the release of previously secret government documents, and analyzing and publishing its collections for the public.

As a prolific FOIA requester, the National Security Archive has obtained a plethora of seminal government documents, including among others, the following:

- The documents behind the most requested still image photograph at the U.S. National Archives – a December 21, 1970 picture of President Richard Nixon's meeting with Elvis Presley;
- The CIA's "Family Jewels" list that documents decades of the agency's illegal activities;
- The National Security Agency's (NSA) description of its watch list of 1,600 Americans that included notable Americans such as civil rights leader Martin Luther King Jr., boxer Muhammad Ali, and politicians Frank Church and Howard Baker;
- The first official CIA confirmation of Area 51;
- FBI transcripts of 25 interviews with Saddam Hussein after his capture by U.S. troops in December 2003;
- The Osama bin Laden File,
- U.S. plans for a "full nuclear response" in the event the President was ever attacked or disappeared;
- The most comprehensive document collections available on the Cold War, including the nuclear flashpoints occurring during the Cuban Missile Crisis and the 1983 "Able Archer" War Scare.

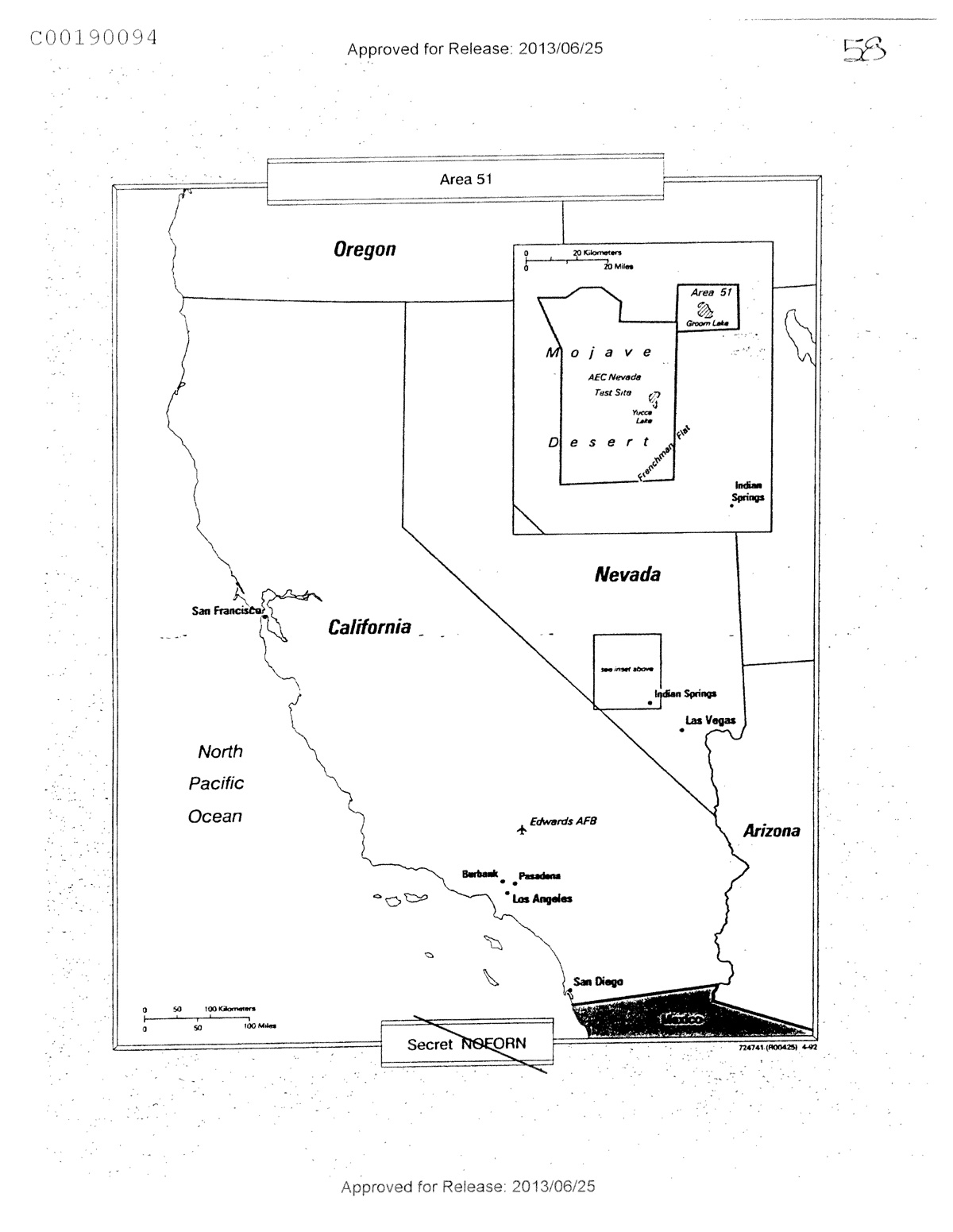
The CIA's declassified map of Groom Lake/Area 51 disclosed to the National Security Archive thanks to a FOIA request

In 1998, the National Security Archive shared the George Foster Peabody Award for the outstanding broadcast series, CNN's Cold War. In 1999, the National Security Archive won the George Polk Award, for, in the words of the citation, "facilitating thousands of searches for journalists and scholars. The archive, funded by foundations as well as income from its own publications, has become a one-stop institution for declassifying and retrieving important documents, suing to preserve such government data as presidential e-mail messages, pressing for appropriate reclassification of files, and sponsoring research that has unearthed major revelations."

In September 2005, the Archive won the Emmy Award for outstanding achievement in news and documentary research. In 2005, Forbes Best of the Web stated that the Archive is "singlehandedly keeping bureaucrats’ feet to the fire on the Freedom of Information Act." In 2007, the Archive was named one of the "Top 300 web sites for Political Science," by the International Political Science Association. In February 2011, the National Security Archive won Tufts University's Dr. Jean Mayer Global Citizenship Award for "demystifying and exposing the underworld of global diplomacy and supporting the public's right to know."

From 2003 to 2014, the Archive received 54 citations from the University of Wisconsin's Internet Scout Report recognizing "the most valuable and authoritative resources online." In 2018, the Association of College and Research Libraries' Choice magazine named the Digital National Security Archive one of the "Outstanding Academic Titles." In 2021, journalist Craig Whitlock of the Washington Post wrote, "The National Security Archive provides an irreplaceable public service by prying loose records from federal agencies that prefer to operate in the dark."

== Funding ==
The National Security Archive relies on publication revenues, grants from individuals and grants from foundations such as the Carnegie Corporation of New York, the Ford Foundation, the William and Flora Hewlett Foundation, the John S. and James L. Knight Foundation, the John D. and Catherine T. MacArthur Foundation, and the Open Society Foundations, for its $3 million yearly budget. The National Security Archive receives no government funding. Incorporated as an independent Washington, D.C. non-profit organization, the National Security Archive is recognized by the Internal Revenue Service as a tax-exempt public charity.

== Program areas ==
The National Security Archive operates eight program areas, each with dedicated funding. The National Security Archive's:

(1) open government and accountability program receives support from the Open Society Foundations.

(2) international freedom of information program in priority countries abroad and in the Open Government Partnership has been supported by the William and Flora Hewlett Foundation, which also supports the Archive's documentation work on cyber security (the Cyber Vault).

(3) human rights evidence program, providing documentation for use by truth commissions and prosecutions, received funding from the John D. and Catherine T. MacArthur Foundation and the General Service Foundation.

(4) Latin America program, with projects on Mexico, Chile, Cuba and other countries, is supported by the Ford Foundation, the Arca Foundation, and the Coyote Foundation.

(5) nuclear weapons and intelligence documentation program, including the creation of the Nuclear Vault, has been supported by the Prospect Hill Foundation, the New-Land Foundation, and the Carnegie Corporation of New York, which also funds the Archive's

(6) Russia/former Soviet Union program. The National Security Archive has a Russian-language page publishing primary sources from Soviet and Russian archives that are no longer open in Moscow.

(7) Iran program has been supported by the Arca Foundation and through a partnership with MIT Center for International Studies.

(8) publications program, creating public access to declassified documents both online and in book formats, relies on publication royalties from libraries that subscribe to the Digital National Security Archive through the commercial publisher ProQuest.

== Publications ==
The National Security Archive publishes its document collections in a variety of ways, including on its website, its blog Unredacted, documentary films, formal truth commission and court proceedings, and through the Digital National Security Archive, which contains over 61 digitized collections of more than 1,000,000 meticulously indexed documents, including the newly available "Targeting Iraq, Part II: War and Occupation, 2002–2011" and "The Afghanistan War and the United States, 1998–2017", published through ProQuest.

National Security Archive staff and fellows have authored some 100 books, including the winners of the 1996 Pulitzer Prize, the 1995 National Book Award, the 1996 Lionel Gelber Prize, the 1996 American Library Association's James Madison Award Citation, a Boston Globe Notable Book selection for 1999, a Los Angeles Times Best Book of 2003, the 2010 Henry Adams Prize for outstanding major publication on the federal government's history from the Society for History in the Federal Government, and the 2010 Link-Kuehl Prize from the Society for Historians of American Foreign Relations.

The National Security Archive regularly publishes Electronic Briefing Books of newsworthy documents on major topics in international affairs on the Archive's website, which attracts more than 2 million visitors each year who download more than 13.3 gigabytes per day. There are currently over 800 briefing books available.

The National Security Archive also frequently posts about declassification and news on its blog, Unredacted.

== Lawsuits ==
The National Security Archive has participated in over 50 Freedom of Information lawsuits against the U.S. government. The suits have forced the declassification of documents ranging from the Kennedy-Khrushchev letters during the Cuban Missile Crisis to the previously censored photographs of homecoming ceremonies with flag-draped caskets for U.S. casualties of the wars in Iraq and Afghanistan.

An Archive Freedom of Information lawsuit compelled the Pentagon to release the 15,000 Donald Rumsfeld "snowflake" memos covering his years as Secretary of Defense (2001–2006), providing essential evidence for the George Polk Award-winning series, "The Afghanistan Papers," written by Craig Whitlock of the Washington Post. Another Archive lawsuit forced the State Department to declassify the memoranda, notes, and highest-level meeting transcripts recorded by Deputy Secretary of State Strobe Talbott during the Clinton administration, with a particular focus on U.S.-Russian relations in the first decade after the end of the Soviet Union.

The National Security Archive also brought and won seminal lawsuits regarding the preservation of White House e-mails and other electronic records. The original White House e-mail lawsuit, beginning in January 1989 with Armstrong v. Reagan and continuing against presidents Ronald Reagan, George H. W. Bush, and Bill Clinton, established that e-mail had to be treated as government records, consequently leading to the preservation of more than 30 million White House e-mail messages from the 1980s and 1990s. The second White House e-mail lawsuit, filed in 2007 against the George W. Bush administration and settled by the Obama administration in 2009, achieved the recovery and preservation of more than 22 million White House e-mail messages that were deleted from White House computers between March 2003 and October 2005.

Cumulatively, the Archive's litigation over the years to preserve White House e-records—lawsuits brought together with a wide range of scholarly and public interest partners, and with the support of multiple pro bono law firms—has resulted in the preservation of over a billion e-mails and e-messages, ranging from the IBM PROFs messages in the Reagan White House of the 1980s, to the WhatsApp messages in the Trump White House of 2020.

During the Trump years (2017–2021), the Archive brought a series of cases challenging record-keeping practices and the lack thereof at the White House. One of President Trump's first actions on record-keeping was to suspend the routine publication of White House visitor logs kept by the Secret Service in vetting visitors and previously released online by the Obama White House some 90 days after the visit.

In April 2017, the National Security Archive, along with the Knight First Amendment Institute at Columbia University and Citizens for Responsibility and Ethics in Washington (CREW), filed a FOIA lawsuit (Doyle v. DHS) against the Department of Homeland Security, the parent agency of the U.S. Secret Service, to compel continued release of the logs. Ultimately, a federal judge in New York and the 2nd Circuit Court of Appeals ruled that the Trump Administration had effectively converted those Secret Service agency records into presidential records not subject to FOIA.

The Archive together with Citizens for Responsibility and Ethics in Washington, also brought suit against the Trump administration's use of messaging applications that can automatically delete conversations or records of conversations. The suit, Citizens for Responsibility and Ethics in Washington et al. v. Trump et al., was filed on June 22, 2017. In March 2017, U.S. District Court Judge Christopher R. Cooper ruled that the act gives the president a "substantial degree of discretion" in deciding what should be preserved as a permanent record and it allows the president to destroy records that no longer have "administrative, historical, informational or evidentiary value." The DC Circuit upheld the Cooper decision, although Circuit Judge David Tatel remarked in the decision that disappearing instant messages represented a technology "that Richard Nixon could only dream of."

In December 2020, the Archive together with the Society for Historians of American Foreign Relations, the American Historical Association, and the public interest group Citizens for Responsibility and Ethics in Washington (CREW) brought a new lawsuit naming the White House and the National Archives as defendants and asking federal court for a temporary restraining order against any destruction of documents during the Trump-Biden transition. Justice Department lawyers assured then-District Judge Ketanji Brown Jackson that a litigation hold as a result of the lawsuit covered all White House records so that a TRO was unnecessary; and after the Biden transition, the government informed Judge Jackson and the plaintiffs that all presidential records had been secured, including the WhatsApp messages generated by senior White House staff. Subsequently, the National Archives realized that many boxes of Trump records were missing, prominently including correspondence with North Korean leader Kim Jong Un, and began recovery measures that ultimately included an FBI raid on Mar-a-Lago.

== Audits ==
Since 2002, the Archive has carried out annual FOIA audits that are designed after the California Sunshine Survey. These FOIA audits evaluate whether government agencies are in compliance with open-government laws. The surveys include:

- The Ashcroft Memo: "Drastic" Change or "More Thunder Than Lightning"?
- Justice Delayed is Justice Denied
- A FOIA Request Celebrates Its 17th Birthday: A Report on Federal Agency FOIA Backlog
- Pseudo-Secrets: A Freedom of Information Audit of the U.S. Government's Policies on Sensitive Unclassified Information
- File Not Found: 10 Years After E-FOIA, Most Federal Agencies are Delinquent
- 40 Years of FOIA, 20 Years of Delay
- Mixed Signals, Mixed Results: How President Bush's Executive Order on FOIA Failed to Deliver
- 2010 Knight Open Government Survey: Sunshine and Shadows
- 2011 Knight Open Government Survey: Glass Half Full
- 2011 Knight Open Government Survey: Eight Federal Agencies Have FOIA Requests a Decade Old
- Outdated Agency Regs Undermine Freedom of Information.
- Half of Federal Agencies Still Use Outdated Freedom of Information Regulations
- Most Agencies Falling Short on Mandate for Online Records
- Saving Government Email an Open Question with December 2016 Deadline Looming

== Rosemary Award ==
Every year the National Security Archive nominates a government agency for the Rosemary Award for worst open government performance. The award is named after President Nixon's secretary, Rose Mary Woods, who erased 18 1/2 minutes of a crucial Watergate tape. Past "winners" include the Department of Justice, the Federal Chief Information Officer's Council, the FBI, the Department of the Treasury, the Air Force, Director of National Intelligence James Clapper, the Secret Service, the White House and the CIA.

== Conferences ==
The Archive has organized, sponsored, or co-sponsored a dozen major conferences. These include the historic conferences held in Havana in 2002 and in Budapest in 1996 respectively. For the Havana conference, which took place during the 40th anniversary of the Cuban Missile Crisis, Cuban president Fidel Castro and former US secretary of defense Robert McNamara discussed newly declassified documents showing that US president John F. Kennedy, in meetings with Soviet leader Nikita Khrushchev's son-in-law Adzhubei in January 1962, compared the US failure at the Bay of Pigs to the Soviet invasion of Hungary in 1956. The Budapest conference of 1996, carried out by the Archive's "Openness in Russia and East Europe Project" in collaboration with Cold War International History Project and Russian and Eastern European partners, focused on the 1956 uprising was a featured subject at an international conference which the Archive, CWIHP, and the Zentrum für Zeithistorische Forschung organized in Potsdam on "The Crisis Year 1953 and the Cold War in Europe." Oxford University historian Timothy Garton Ash called the conference "not ordinary at all.... this dramatic confrontation of documents and memories, of written and oral history...."

Other noteworthy conferences the National Security Archive took part in include a conference held in Hanoi in 1997, during which Defense Secretary Robert McNamara met with his Vietnamese counterpart, Gen. Võ Nguyên Giáp, and a series of conferences on U.S.-Iranian relations.

In December 2016 the Archive, with the Carnegie Corporation, the Nuclear Threat Initiative, and the Carnegie Endowment, hosted a conference on the 25th anniversary of the Nunn-Lugar nuclear threat reduction legislation, which helped secure post-Soviet nuclear weapons. The conference, attended by Senators Sam Nunn and Richard Lugar as well as other Nunn-Lugar veterans including Russians, Kazakhs, and Americans, was held in the Kennedy Caucus Room of the U.S. Senate and discussed the future of mutual security and U.S.-Russian relations.

== Board ==
Based at George Washington University's Gelman Library, the Archive operates under a Board of Directors that includes the Archive's Executive Director, Thomas S. Blanton, and gains substantive expertise from an Advisory Board.

Board of directors

- Chair: Edgar N. James, Esq. (partner, James & Hoffman; pro bono litigator on behalf of the Archive)
- Chair emeritus: Sheila S. Coronel (director, Stabile Center for Investigative Journalism, Graduate School of Journalism, Columbia University; former director, Philippine Center for Investigative Journalism)
- Vice chair: Nancy E. Soderberg (distinguished visiting scholar, Department of Political Science and Public Administration, University of Northern Florida; former vice president, International Crisis Group; former U.S. Alternate Representative to the United Nations; former deputy assistant to the president for national security affairs; former staff director, National Security Council; appointed chair of the Public Interest Declassification Board in January 2012)
- Secretary: Cliff Sloan (professor, Georgetown University Law School; former partner, Skadden Arps; Special Envoy for Guantanamo Closure, Department of State, 2013–2014; general counsel of Washington Post/Newsweek Interactive, 2000–2008)
- Treasurer: Nancy Kranich (former associate dean of libraries, New York University; former president, American Library Association)
- Michael Abramowitz (president, Freedom House; former director, National Institute for Holocaust Education of the United States Holocaust Memorial Museum; former White House correspondent and national editor of The Washington Post)
- Danielle Holley (dean and professor of law, Howard University Law School; executive committee, Lawyers' Committee for Civil Rights; former associate dean, University of South Carolina Law School)
- Vivian Schiller (chief digital officer, NBC News; former president, National Public Radio; former senior vice president, The New York Times Company; former senior vice president, The Discovery Times Channel)
- President: Thomas S. Blanton (director, National Security Archive)

Advisory board

- Dr. Philip Brenner, Ph.D. (professor of international relations and former chair, School of International Service, American University; lead plaintiff in Archive lawsuit for Cuban Missile Crisis documents)
- Susan Brynteson (Former University Librarian, University of Delaware; Former Chair, American Library Association Intellectual Freedom Committee)
- Dr. Anne Cahn, Ph.D. (former member of the board of directors, United States Institute of Peace; author of Killing Détente; former director, Committee on National Security; former Arms Control and Disarmament Agency and Department of Defense staffer)
- Rosemary Chalk (National Research Council, National Academy of Sciences)
- John Dinges (professor, Columbia University School of Journalism; former managing editor, National Public Radio; Archive Fellow and author of Our Man in Panama)
- Dr. Joan Hoff, Ph.D. (research professor of history, Montana State University; former Professor of History and Chair of the Baker Institute, Ohio University; former executive secretary, Organization of American Historians)
- Dr. Akira Iriye, Ph.D. (professor of history, Harvard University; past president, American Historical Association)
- Dr. David Alan Rosenberg, Ph.D. (professor of maritime strategy, National War College; former MacArthur Fellow)
- Tina Rosenberg, (Co-Founder, Solutions Journalism Network; former New York Times Editorial Board; former MacArthur Fellow; former Archive Fellow and Pulitzer Prize winner for her book The Haunted Land)
- Jack Siggins (former university librarian, The George Washington University)
- Thomas Susman, Esq. (American Bar Association Washington Office; former partner, Ropes & Gray; former counsel, U.S. Senate Judiciary Committee; co-author of the 1974 Freedom of Information Act amendments)

== See also ==
- CIA Library
- Freedom of the Press Foundation
- Library of National Intelligence
- National Security Agency academic publications
- WikiLeaks
- Peter Kornbluh, National Security Archive senior analyst
