= Courtney E. Martin =

Feminist, author, speaker, activist (born 1979)

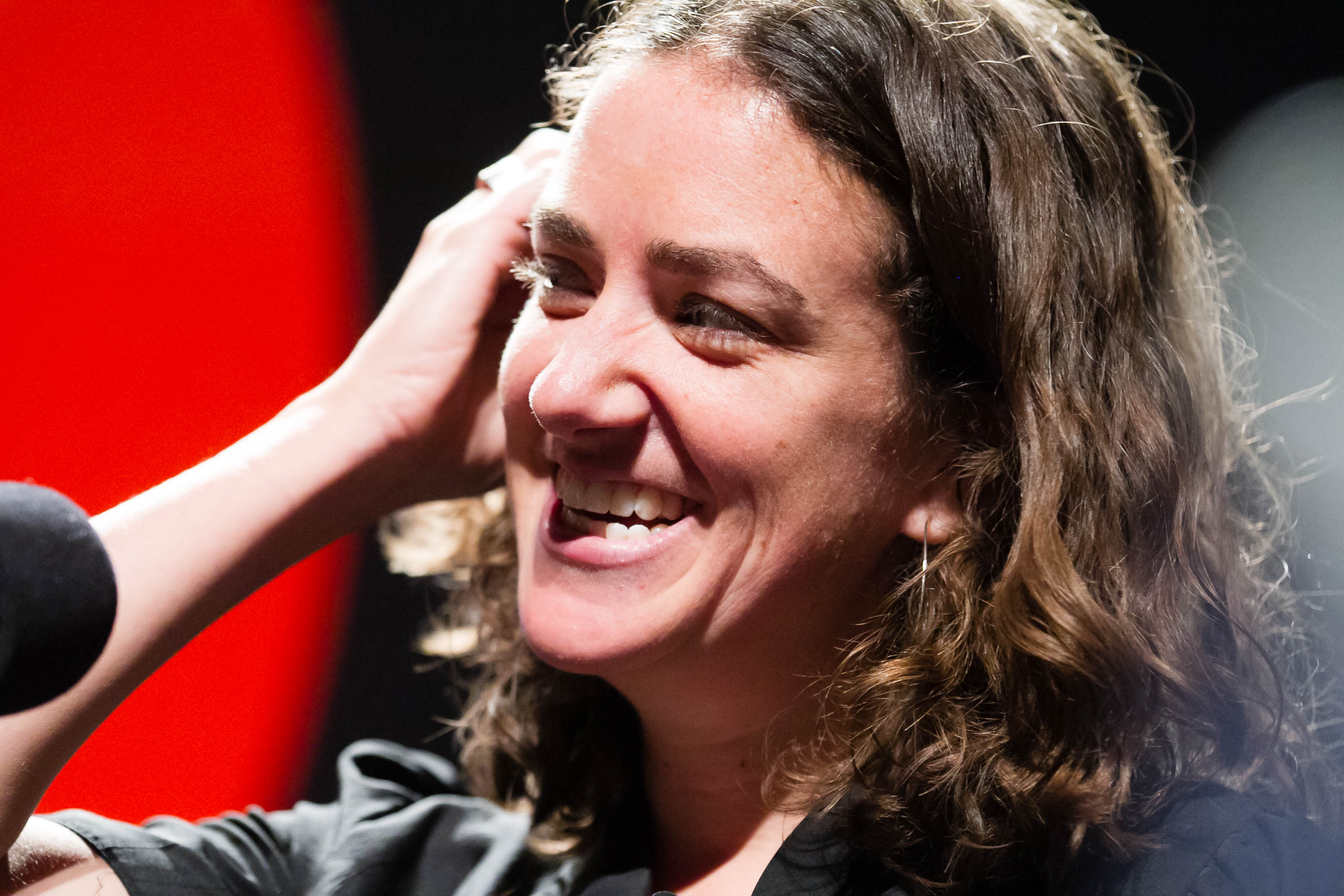
- Martin at PopTech 2014
- Born: December 31, 1979 (age 46); Colorado Springs, Colorado, U.S.
- Education: Barnard College (BA); New York University (MA)
- Writing career
- Subject: Feminism

Courtney E. Martin (born December 31, 1979) is an American feminist, author, speaker, and social and political activist. She is known for writing books, speaking at universities throughout the nation, and for co-editing the feminist blog, Feministing.com. Her work also appears on numerous other blogs and websites. She is also a recipient of the Elie Wiesel Prize in Ethics. She is known for promoting feminism by integrating storytelling and solutions into her writings and talks. According to Parker Palmer, she is “one of our most insightful culture critics and one of our finest young writers.” In 2013 she helped found the Solutions Journalism Network with journalists David Bornstein and Tina Rosenberg.

== Background ==
Courtney Martin is from Colorado Springs, Colorado, where she and her brother were raised by her parents. Her parents both strongly believed in women and men having equal contributions. Her mother created the longest running women's film festival in the world while Martin was a teenager. Martin attended William J. Palmer High School in Colorado, and went on to attend Barnard College in New York City. She received a Bachelor of Arts degree in political science as well as sociology. She later went on to study at New York University, where she received a Master of Arts in writing and social change. Martin now resides in Oakland, California with her husband, John, and their daughter, Maya.

== Feminist positions ==
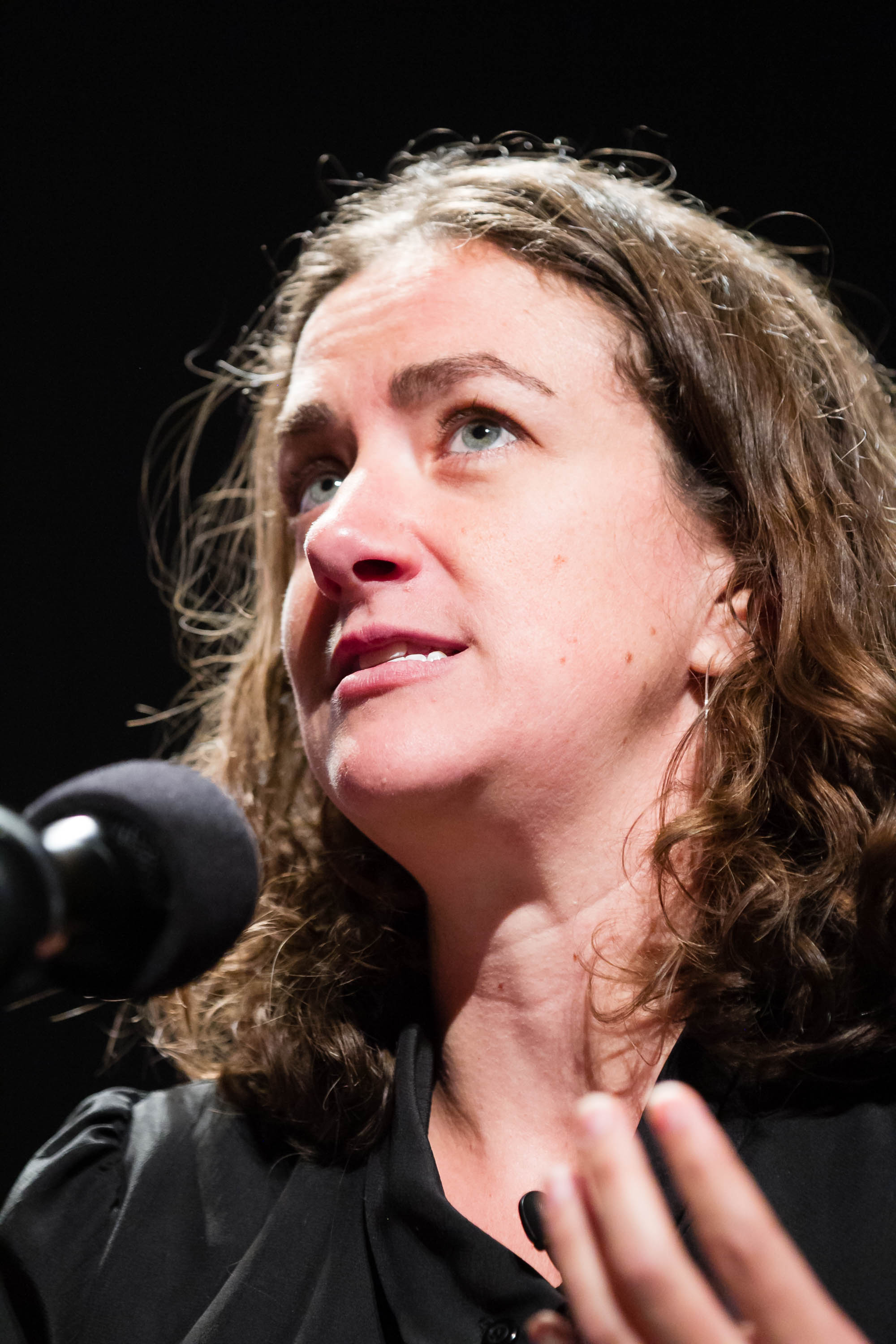
Martin at PopTech 2014

=== Feminist waves ===
Martin self-identifies as a third-wave feminist. In many of her speeches and writings, she discusses the generation gap between different waves of feminism, specifically second-wave feminism and third-wave feminism in terms of her own personal experiences between her mother and herself.

As detailed during a public forum with Deborah Siegel, Martin asserts that older generations often view third-wavers as entitled, but she states they were raised to believe they deserved certain rights and to fight for them. She also points out that third-wavers have grown up in a world filled with many issues, leading her to state that her generation is overwhelmed. In a TEDtalk in 2011, Martin brings up the issues of wealth disparity, xenophobia, environmental crisis, and sex trafficking and states “it’s enough to make you feel very overwhelmed.”

Another differentiating factor influencing the gap between second and third-wave feminism that Martin discusses is how they approach political activism. Her opinion is that second-wavers typically organize protest marches in order to create change, while third-wavers have turned to “online organizing.” Using social media, online petitions, and blogs to raise awareness about feminist issues and social issues in general, as well as to bring about change, is a viable strategy that Martin argues could be the future of feminism.

=== Work-family balance ===
Martin argues that the issue of work-family balance is not just a women's issue, saying "men need family-friendly workplaces" as well. She calls for workplace-provided childcare, legislature to "craft policies that support individuals and families," maternity and paternity leave, and more workplace flexibility. In an article for skirt.com in 2008, Martin wrote "how can we claim to be economic providers and role models for our daughters and sons if we aren't also improving the work place climate they will inherit?"

== Books ==
- Perfect Girls, Starving Daughters; The Frightening New Normalcy of Hating Your Body, Courtney E. Martin, Simon & Schuster, 2007. Perfect Girls discusses the implications of the cultural emphasis on dieting and weight loss. This book focuses on the impact that an obsession with food, weight, and body image has on women and the feminist movement. Martin argues that women need to think more positively about their bodies and redirect their energy toward creating better possibilities for life.
- The Naked Truth: Young, Beautiful, and (HIV) Positive, by Marvelyn Brown with Courtney Martin, HarperCollins, 2008. The story of how a normal 19-year-old girl contracted HIV, that set her in a fight for her life, and in a situation that estranged her from her community. Despite her circumstances, she remains positive and shares her story in hopes of preventing others from going through her pain.
- Click: When We Knew We Were Feminists, Edited by J. Courtney Sullivan and Courtney E. Martin, Seal Press, 2010. Sullivan and Martin follow the stories of a number of influential women and the moments in their lives that led them to becoming feminists. Through these women's stories, the authors describe what makes a feminist, and how the role of a feminist changes with the times.
- Do It Anyways: The New Generation of Activists, Courtney E. Martin, Beacon Press 2010. Do It Anyways fights the claims that the younger generation is apathetic by telling the stories of eight activists who, despite being ordinary people, are making a difference in the world.
- Project Rebirth: Survival and the Strength of the Human Spirit from 9/11 Survivors, by Dr. Robert Stern and Courtney E. Martin, Dutton/Penguin Press, 2011. A psychologist and a journalist examine how eight survivors from the 9/11 attacks learn to cope with grief and find peace despite their circumstances.
- The New Better Off: Reinventing the American Dream, Courtney E. Martin, Seal Press, 2016. Martin examines the current, collective understanding of "The American Dream" and its flaws. She then highlights alternative approaches to gender roles, housing, work, and other parts of life that people find highly fulfilling.
- Learning in Public: Lessons for a Racially Divided America from My Daughter's School, Courtney E. Martin, Little, Brown and Company, 2021. After navigating the world of school choice and selecting a majority-Black, poorly-rated neighborhood public school for her daughter to attend, Martin investigates the disconnect between the values many white families express and the racially homogenous, selective schools they choose for their own children to attend.

== Online contributions ==
Martin spreads her views on feminism and family friendly workplaces through the medium of the internet. She contributed as a co-editor to Feministing.com, the largest feminist blog from 2004 until recently. Martin is now a weekly columnist for On Being. Her work can also be found on sites such as YES! Magazine, The New York Times, and TED talks. Martin has been a co-founder to numerous online organizations, including Valenti Martin Media and #femfuture, which aim to break the boundaries of traditional views towards women. Martin also contributes to mainstream websites such as the Huffington Post. Martin is also a Senior Correspondent for The American Prospect. She has penned a number of articles on the site, including: “The Problem with Youth Activism”, and “Why Class Matters in Campus Activism”. In these two articles, Martin discusses the way America's youth has lost the outrage and civil disobedience of previous generations in favor of school sanctioned demonstrations, and how the American youth today do not display the robust activism that United Kingdom students have recently displayed regarding school tuition budget cuts.
