= Cathrine Gyldensted =

Danish journalist (born 1973)

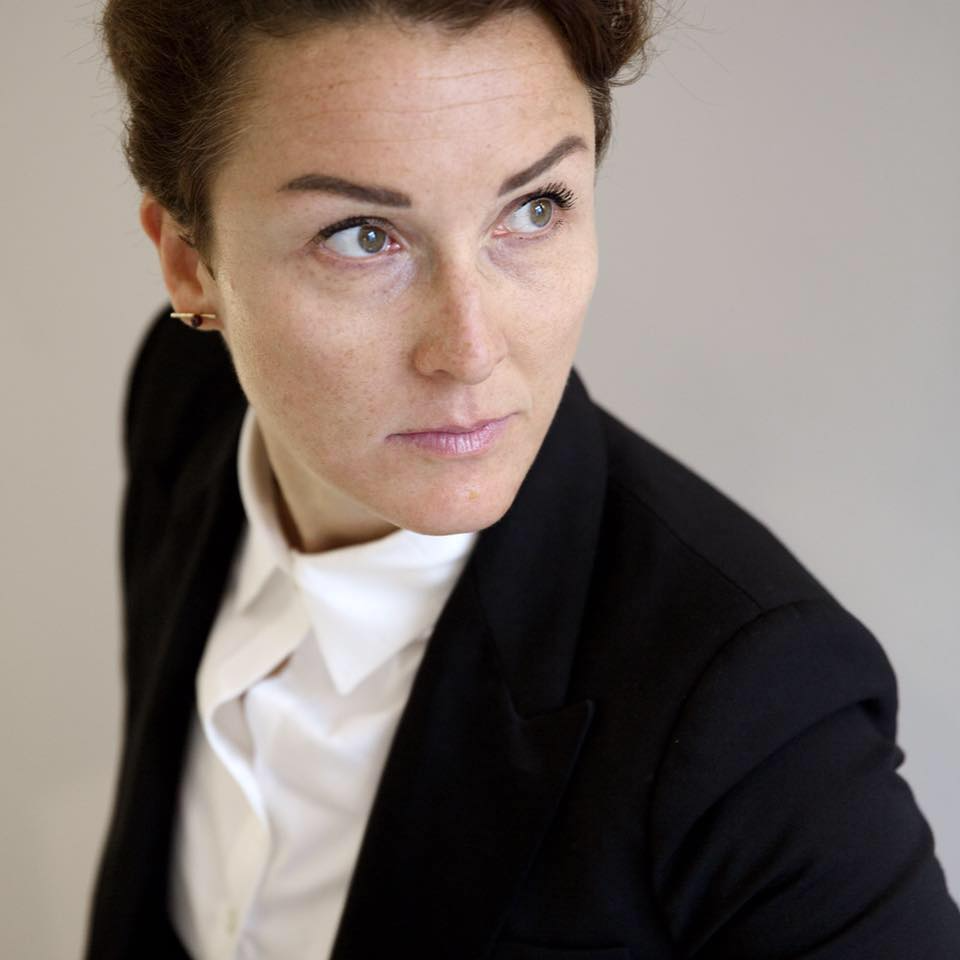
- Gyldensted in 2017
- Born: Copenhagen, Denmark
- Education: Danish School of Journalism, University of Pennsylvania
- Occupations: Journalist, director of Constructive Journalism
- Notable credit: TV Avisen Magasinet Søndag Huffington Post
- Spouse: Torsten Stiig Jansen
- Website: www.cathrinegyldensted.com

Cathrine Gyldensted (born 1973) is a Danish journalist, author, correspondent, and news presenter and since 2011 the originator of innovating journalism through behavioural sciences like positive psychology, moral psychology and prospection known as constructive journalism. She coined the term, academically, in 2017 with Karen McIntyre.

Much of Gyldensted's method and framework belong within the domain of constructive journalism. In December 2015, she was appointed the world's first Director of Constructive Journalism at the Journalism School at Windesheim University of Applied Sciences in the Netherlands. I december 2015 blev hun udnævnt til direktør for konstruktiv journalistik ved nl i Holland, en nyoprettet stilling med fokus på udvikling og forskning i konstruktiv journalistik. She left Windesheim in July 2017 and co-founded Constructive Journalism Network based in Amsterdam, a journalistic online network based in Amsterdam focusing on constructive journalism and research pertaining to constructive journalism.

== Early and personal life ==
Gyldensted was born in Copenhagen and lived in 1983 with her mother and sister in Saudi Arabia, but later moved to Slagelse, Denmark, graduating in 1991 from Slagelse Gymnasium og HF-kursus. In 1996 she is admitted to the Danish School of Media and Journalism and graduated in February 2000 specializing in foreign reporting and radio journalism. Gyldensted's parents are Carsten Gyldensted, professor emeritus, Neuroradiology, Center of Functionally Integrative Neuroscience - CFIN at Aarhus University and Merete Gyldensted retired Senior Physician at Slagelse Sygehus.

She lives in Copenhagen with Torsten Jansen, a former US correspondent and News Anchor at Danish Broadcasting Corporation In 2008, they wrote the book Obama City together about power structures in Washington D.C.

== Career ==
Gyldensted began her career in journalism working for Radioavisen at Danish Broadcasting Corporation. She was then hired as a TV reporter for TV Avisen in 2001 with shorter editorial TV projects elsewhere within Danish Broadcasting Corporation She was appointed an extra correspondent for Danish Broadcasting Corporation moving to Washington in 2007. She remained there until 2011, before returning to Copenhagen embarking on her work with developing the constructive journalism framework and research. In 2003 she was nominated for the Cavling Prize for uncovering rare cancers amongst retired army radar personnel in NATO.

In her time with Danish Broadcasting Corporation, she has met such US politicians as Madeleine Albright, Hillary Clinton and Barack Obama and the musician David Bowie.

She was the head editor of the live talk show Clement Direkte with Clement Kjersgaard in 2004. In 2011, she was anchoring a foreign news radio show “Globus” and the culture show “AK24syv” both at the Danish national radio station, Radio24syv. Gyldensted has written two books, “From Mirrors to Movers. Five elements of Constructive Journalism”, and "Blev Du Klogere. A Depolarizing Debate Format", and co-written six others: “Reporting beyond the problem. From Civic Journalism to Solutions Journalism”, “Obama City”, “Håndbog i Konstruktiv Journalistik”, “En Konstruktiv Nyhed”, “Glimt Af Amerika”, and “Gurubogen”.

=== Constructive journalism ===
From 2011 onward, Gyldensted increasingly focused on developing constructive journalism, incorporating insights from positive psychology, behavioural science, and solution-focused communication.

In December 2015 she was appointed the first Director of Constructive Journalism at Windesheim University of Applied Sciences in the Netherlands, a position she held until July 2017.

After leaving Windesheim, she contributed to the expansion of constructive journalism through research, teaching, and advisory roles. She is a member of the advisory board of the Hellenic Institute of Constructive Journalism.

=== Scholarship and influence ===
Gyldensted is credited—alongside Karen McIntyre—with formalising the term “constructive journalism” in academic literature around 2017.

Her 2015 book From Mirrors to Movers presented one of the first operational frameworks for constructive journalism.

Her 2020 book Blev du klogere? introduced a depolarising debate and dialogue format grounded in constructive journalism methodologies.

In 2021, she co-authored the chapter "Constructive journalism: Portraying the world accurately through positive psychology reporting" with Peter Bro.

A 2025 systematic review analysing 71 publications identified six core elements—solutions, future orientation, inclusiveness, empowerment, context, and co-creation—and cited Gyldensted as foundational in the field’s development.

== Publications ==
- From Mirrors to Movers: Five Elements of Constructive Journalism (2015)
- Blev du klogere? (2020)
- "Constructive journalism: Portraying the World accurately through positive psychology reporting" (2021, with Peter Bro)

== See also ==
- Constructive journalism
- Solutions journalism
- Positive psychology
