= Susan Davis (author) =

American organization president

- Education: Georgetown (BSFS); Harvard (MPA); Oxford University (MPhil candidate)
- Occupations: Author, Professor
- Spouse: Claudia Slacik (m. 2012–present)

Susan Davis is an author, public speaker, consultant and expert on international development and social entrepreneurship. She is the Chairperson of Solutions Journalism Network, an Adjunct Associate Professor at New York University Stern School of Business, a coach to social entrepreneurs and active on many boards and advisory councils.

She was the founding president and CEO of BRAC USA, an organization created in 2006 to support BRAC, a position she held until 2016. BRAC runs programs to alleviate poverty using microfinance, education, healthcare, legal services, community empowerment, and other methods.

== Career ==
=== NYU ===
Davis has been an advisor to New York University's Catherine B. Reynolds Program for Social Entrepreneurship since its inception. She taught Social Entrepreneurship and Sustainable Development in the Spring semester of 2015 at the School of International and Public Affairs at Columbia University and at NYU's Reynolds/Stern School program in spring 2017. She taught the graduate course, Social Entrepreneurship and Sustainable Development, at NYU Stern School of Business in spring 2018 and 2019 and in spring 2020, offering an undergraduate course, Social Entrepreneurship.

=== Ashoka ===
Susan led Ashoka's Global Academy for Social Entrepreneurship and serves on its international board committee that selects Ashoka Fellows and the Advisory Council of Ashoka U, its program for universities. She also oversaw Ashoka's expansion to the Middle East, North Africa and Central Asia and served as a Senior Advisor to the Director General of the International Labour Organization.

=== Other ===
Davis served as the Assistant Director of the first quasi-public export trading company founded by the Port Authority of New York and New Jersey.

She was the executive director of Women's Environment & Development Organization, founded in 1990 by Bella Abzug and Mim Kelber to take action in the United Nations and other international policymaking forums.

Prior to that, she led initiatives aimed at scaling up microfinance institutions that were owned and governed by poor women at Women's World Banking and the Ford Foundation in Bangladesh.

During her four and half years in Dhaka, she organized the Grameen Bank, BRAC and Proshika donor consortia to scale up microfinance.

She was a founding board member and chair of the Grameen Foundation and was a board member there as of 2013.

She was also featured in Fast Company's The League of Extraordinary Women list in 2012.

== Education ==
Davis was educated at Georgetown (BSFS 1978), Harvard (MPA 1982), and Oxford University (MPhil candidate 1980-81).

== Personal life ==
Davis married Claudia Slacik on December 12, 2012 at Middle Collegiate Church in New York City.

== Publications and appearances ==
In 2010, Davis co-authored the book Social Entrepreneurship: What Everyone Needs to Know with David Bornstein. She has appeared on CNN and ABC News discussing global poverty and health issues.

See her TEDx talk at the World Bank Group on Reaching the Excluded that discussed BRAC’s pioneering Ultra Poor program and its importance in ending extreme poverty by 2030. TEDxWBG https://www.youtube.com/watch?v=TMxPuTVNBX4

Her work on microfinance and entrepreneurship creation in developing countries has appeared in Innovations, Forbes, Harvard Business Review and other publications. https://www.khoslaventures.com/wp-content/uploads/The-Architecture-of-Audacity.pdf

Susan Davis was interviewed for a series of a dozen short video stories on Sarder TV to reflect upon BRAC, social entrepreneurship, leadership, learning and life lessons: http://sardertv.com/tag/susan-davis/

In addition, Davis appeared on 60 Minutes in its landmark segment, Banker to the Poor, on Muhammad Yunus and the Grameen Bank of Bangladesh in 1988. She was working with the Ford Foundation in Dhaka, Bangladesh at the time of the interview and first broadcast. In September 2017, she interviewed Yunus in Chicago for the Council: https://www.thechicagocouncil.org/event/empowering-women-entrepreneurs-through-inclusive-finance

In 2013, she delivered a Frank Rhodes lecture as part of "Creation of the Future: A Lecture Series for a New American University" at Arizona State University.

In 2014, Georgetown University invited her to be the Lavender Commencement speaker: https://lgbtq.georgetown.edu/programs/archives/2013-14/lavender-graduation

Susan Davis has published numerous articles on the Huffington Post http://m.huffpost.com/us/author/susan-davis.

Susan Davis was interviewed by Rainmaker TV at the Clinton Global Initiative for several years about her work at CEO of BRAC USA. See http://rainmakers.tv/susan-davis-brac-cgi-2013/ https://rainmakers.tv/susan-davis-president-brac-usa-cgi2012/ https://rainmakers.tv/susan-davis-president-ceo-brac-usa-cgi2011/ https://m.youtube.com/watch?v=H-0-v8DLmSA http://blog.brac.net/previous/2010/10/susan-davis-talks-to-rainmakers-tv-about-brac/

She spoke at the Carnegie Council https://www.carnegiecouncil.org/studio/multimedia/20110622-ethics-matter-microfinance-pioneer-susan-davis

https://www.carnegiecouncil.org/studio/multimedia/20110207-just-business-susan-davis-on-business-solutions-to-fight-poverty

In 2009 she delivered a keynote for the Chicago Council: https://www.wbez.org/shows/wbez-news/breakfast-keynote-with-susan-davis-of-brac-usa/3efeb5c2-7cba-4aef-965b-a32e37df805e

She has spoken at the United Nations on many occasions throughout the years and have been interviewed on UN TV on sustainable development and social justice issues. https://academicimpact.un.org/sites/academicimpact.un.org/files/Newsletter%20August%20-%20September%202015-1.pdf

Susan has been an active member of the Skoll social entrepreneurship community since inception. Some of her contributions are listed here: http://archive.skoll.org/?s=100703&type=author

Susan Davis was the Executive Director of the Women’s Environment and Development Organization (WEDO) from 1993 to 1998 and was interviewed many times including this footage from Norwegian television about its strategy and work: https://m.youtube.com/watch?v=VQ09t1p3bIs

In 2018, Susan Davis was interviewed by Zainab Salbi as part of her Two Peas series on activism. The interview with Davis and several other activists may be found here: http://zainabsalbi.com/twopeas/

== Board memberships ==
- Solutions Journalism Network - Chair of the Board https://www.solutionsjournalism.org/who-we-are/team?active=board
- Segal Family Foundation - board member
- Catchafire - board member
- The Garrison Institute - former board member
- The Middle Project - Treasurer and board member
- Focus for Health Foundation - Advisory Council member
- Centre for Social Innovation - former New York board member
- BeMore America - Advisory Council
- Ashoka U - Advisory Council since 2006
- Dreambase - past board member
- Grameen Foundation – founding board member and past board chair, former board member 17 years
- Sirleaf Market Women's Fund – past board member
- Project Enterprise – past board member
- Aid to Artisans – past board member
- BRAC, BRAC USA, BRAC International - past Board member
- BRAC Liberia Microfinance Company Ltd. and BRAC Sierra Leone Microfinance Company Ltd. - former Chairperson
- United Nations Fund for International Partnerships - Advisory Board member, appointed by the UN Secretary General for two terms ending in 2017
- Learn with All - board member of start-up technology platform enterprise to promote collaborative lifelong learning via L2O, 2016–17
