= Gerd Maria May =

- Occupations: Journalist, author, media consultant, lecturer
- Known for: Constructive and participatory journalism; Room of Solutions; FINT/STEP model

Gerd Maria May (also known as Gerd Maria May Hertz) is a Danish journalist, author, media consultant, and lecturer. She is the founder of the consultancy Room of Solutions and is known for her work in constructive journalism, audience engagement, participatory local news formats, and climate communication. May has contributed to newsroom development, journalism education, and democratic dialogue initiatives in Denmark, the Nordic region, and internationally.

== Early life and education ==
May graduated in journalism from the University of Southern Denmark (SDU). She also studied social sciences and humanities (SamBas) at Roskilde University and trained as a physical education instructor at Paul Petersen's Sports Institute in Copenhagen, which does not currently have an English Wikipedia article. She later completed an executive education program in strategy, leadership, and innovation at INSEAD.

== Career ==
=== Newsroom and editorial development ===
May has held several editorial development roles in Danish news organizations, including serving as development manager at Fyens Stiftstidende and later as head of editorial development for Jysk Fynske Medier, a Danish regional media group. Her work in these roles included digital transformation, audience inclusion, and experimenting with new approaches to local journalism.

=== Constructive Institute ===
From 2018 to 2019, May was a fellow at the Constructive Institute at Aarhus University. Her work contributed to the development of methods and value frameworks used in constructive and participatory journalism and has influenced newsroom practices in Denmark and abroad.

=== Room of Solutions ===
In 2019, May founded the consultancy Room of Solutions. The company works with media innovation, constructive journalism, audience engagement, and strategic development for news organizations, municipalities, civil society organizations, and educational institutions in Denmark and internationally.

She also teaches professional development courses—primarily in climate journalism, constructive journalism, and audience engagement—through Mediernes Efteruddannelse, the Danish national journalism training provider.

== Academic affiliations ==
May is an external lecturer at the Department of Political Science and Public Management at the University of Southern Denmark.

In 2022, she received a Fyens Stiftstidende Fellowship at SDU for the project From Climate Opinion to Climate Action, which investigates how journalism can motivate citizens to take climate-related action.

She has taught constructive and participatory journalism at the Danish School of Media and Journalism.

== FINT / STEP model ==
May developed a value-based framework for constructive and participatory journalism. The Danish version is known as FINT, while the international version is known as STEP. Both refer to the same conceptual model.

=== FINT (Danish version) ===
The acronym stands for:

- Fællesskab (Community)
- Inspiration
- Nuancer (Nuance)
- Tillid (Trust)

The model is outlined in her book Fra tårn til torv as a value-based supplement to traditional news criteria.

=== STEP (English version) ===
STEP represents:

- Solutions
- Trust
- Engagement
- Perspective

In 2022, May led a four-day international engaged journalism workshop for Media4Change in Lithuania, where the STEP model was applied in editorial practice.

== Work with the Danish Climate People’s Meeting ==
May has been a recurring moderator and facilitator at the Danish Klimafolkemødet (“Climate People’s Meeting”) in Middelfart. In the 2025 program, she is listed as moderator for several sessions, including “Move the Climate with Your Education” and “Can Democracy Save the Climate?”.

She also developed the youth program RYK Klimaet (“Move the Climate”), which prepares young people to participate in democratic climate debates and concludes with activities at the Climate People's Meeting.

== Local journalism and democracy ==
May's work emphasizes local journalism as a form of democratic infrastructure. A profile published by the Swedish research program Media & Democracy highlights her contributions to co-created journalism formats and constructive public dialogue in local communities.

== Climate journalism ==
May also works in climate journalism through research projects and professional training. Her SDU fellowship explores how constructive storytelling can strengthen climate motivation and support pro-environmental behavior.

== Works ==
- Fra tårn til torv – Journalistens rolle i den involverende og konstruktive journalistik (2020), University Press of Southern Denmark.
