= David Bornstein =

David Bornstein may refer to:

- David Bornstein (author), American journalist who writes about social innovation
- David Bornstein (politician) (born 1940), Australian politician
- Dovid Bornsztain (1876–1942), third Rebbe of Sochatchov
