= Commencement (disambiguation) =

Commencement most commonly refers to graduation, the ceremony at which students receive academic degrees.

Commencement may also refer to:

- Commencement (album), a 2002 album by American band Deadsy
- Commencement (novel), a 2010 novel by J. Courtney Sullivan
- "Commencement" (Agents of S.H.I.E.L.D.: Academy)
- "Commencement" (Smallville), an episode in season four of Smallville
- "Commencement" (The West Wing), an episode in the fourth season of The West Wing
- Coming into force, or commencement, is the day legislation begins to have legal effect

== See also ==
- Commencement speech, a speech given during university graduation in the U.S.
- Commencement Bay, in Puget Sound in Washington, U.S.
