= GoodNewsNetwork =

Online positive news stories

The Good News Network
- Website type: News
- Available in: English
- Owner: Geri Weis-Corbley
- Website: www.goodnewsnetwork.org
- Registration: Free
- Launched: 1997
- Current status: Online

Good News Network is an American online newspaper which publishes exclusive news stories.

== Overview ==
The website was launched in 1997 by Geri Weis-Corbley. It publishes uplifting news gathered from sources around the world. The purpose is to share positive and encouraging stories, as well as technology and health. Weis-Corbley says that it is a "clearinghouse for the gathering and dissemination of positive, compelling new stories."

== Content ==
An example of a positive story was one from 2009 about the kinds of jobs being created in solar and wind energy industries due to a stimulus package. It tackles how positive reinforcement is meaningful, such as when a Canadian police department gives out positive tickets to citizens.

Good News Network published its 18,000th news story in January 2017.

The network also hosts the Good News Gurus Podcast which also focuses on positive news but in the podcast medium.

== Readership ==
The site experiences increased traffic following difficult events, like the September 11 attacks. There was also a 45% increase in readership when the bank bailouts began in 2008.

GoodNewsNetwork's articles are cited in books, including an article about how United States mayors are embracing the Kyoto Protocol in a book about carbon reduction.

== Funding ==
The company earns its revenue from online advertising on the site. Readers may also become members by contributing donations of between $2.00 – $500, and receive bonus downloadable gifts as a thank-you.

== In popular culture ==
- Mentioned in Deadly Charm: An Amanda Bell Brown Mystery published in 2009 by Claudia Mair Burney.

== See also ==
- Positive News
- Positivity effect
- Yes! (U.S. magazine)
