= Yes! (American magazine) =

Nonprofit independent publisher

YES!
- Fall 2010 cover of YES!
- Executive Editor: Evette Dionne
- Former editors: Tracy Loeffelholz Dunn
- Staff writers: Sunnivie Brydum, Managing Editor Breanna Draxler, Senior Editor Sonali Kolhatkar, Senior Editor
- Frequency: Quarterly
- First issue: 1996
- Final issue: 2025
- Company: Positive Futures Network
- Country: United States
- Based in: Poulsbo, WA, United States
- Language: English
- Website: yesmagazine.org
- ISSN: 1089-6651

YES! was a nonprofit, independent publisher of solutions journalism. YES! was founded by David Korten and Sarah van Gelder; Khalilah Elliott is the interim executive director.

The first issue of the magazine was published in summer 1996. In May 2025, the editors announced their intention to cease operations at the end of the following June.

Issues of YES! explore a specific issue in depth, and provide resources so that readers may become involved in that issue. Previous issues have covered topics such as just transition, sanctuary city, solidarity economy and decolonization.

The magazine is printed on recycled paper and archives all its issues online.

YES! is a member of The Media Consortium, an international network of over 70 independent progressive journalism organizations including Mother Jones, The Nation, Grist, Democracy Now!, and others. YES! and other Media Consortium outlets participated in a 2017 study that looked at the impact they could have on the national conversation.

In 2015, YES! Magazine was showcased on Neil Young's July tour promoting The Monsanto Years. Young selected five magazines to feature in a "News You Can Trust" tent, including YES!, The Nation, Mother Jones, Permaculture Magazine, and Earth Island Journal.

The magazine ceased publication in June 2025, citing "slowed giving and reduced philanthropic investment in independent media—particularly media that centers the stories and voices of historically excluded communities".

== Awards ==
- Winner of 2017 excellence award for Zenobia Jeffries column on racial justice from the National Association of Black Journalists.
- Winner of 2016 Northwest Excellence Award from the Society of Professional Journalists, YES!’s Jennifer Luxon and Stephen Miller received first place for digital innovation.
- Second place, 2016 Northwest Excellence Award, YES! Staff, in general excellence for two issues, Life After Oil and Gender Justice.
- Winner of 2016 National Association of Black Journalists Salute to Excellence awards. YES!'s Liz Pleasant won first place in commentary.
- Winner of 2015 Northwest Excellence Award from the Society of Professional Journalists, YES!’s Marcus Harrison Green won first place in government and politics reporting.
- Winner of 2015 Northwest Excellence Award, YES! Staff received first place in social issues reporting and third place for environment, nature and science reporting.
- Second Place, 2015 Northwest Excellence Award, YES! Staff received second place for an online news video.
- Winner of 2013 Utne Media award for General Excellence.
- Winner of 2001 Utne Reader Alternate Press Award for Best Culture coverage, and was nominated for Best Political Coverage in 2004.

== See also ==
- GoodNewsNetwork
- HappyNews.com
- Institute for Nonprofit News (member)
- Positive News
- Solutions journalism
