= Susan Brynteson =

American librarian

- Born: Susan Shafer Dieckmann; February 18, 1936; Huntington, West Virginia, U.S.
- Died: May 26, 2025 (aged 89)
- Occupation: Academic librarian
- Known for: Head of the University of Delaware Library

Susan Shafer Dieckmann Brynteson (February 18, 1936 – May 26, 2025) was an American librarian. She was head of the University of Delaware Library for over 35 years, and was librarian at the Yaddo arts community for many years.

== Early life and education ==
Dieckmann was born in Huntington, West Virginia and raised in Cincinnati, Ohio, the daughter of Shafer O. Dieckmann and Alpha Dieckmann. She graduated from Western Hills High School, and earned a bachelor's degree in philosophy and a master's degree in library science from the University of Wisconsin–Madison. In college she was a member of the Kappa Kappa Gamma sorority.

== Career ==
After working in several university libraries as a young woman, Brynteson became director of the University of Delaware Library in 1980. She was named May Morris University Librarian in 2001, and became Vice Provost for Libraries in 2008. She oversaw the library's physical expansion and significant technological upgrades in the 1980s and 1990s, and its acquisition of important collections, including the papers of Joe Biden and Paul Laurence Dunbar. She retired with emerita status in 2015, and received the university's Medal of Distinction for her contributions.

Brynteson was a volunteer librarian for the Yaddo arts community for many years, and served on the community's board of directors. She was active at the national level in the American Library Association, as a member of the ALA Council, chair of the ALA Publishing Committee and chair of the ALA Legislative Committee. She served on the advisory board of the National Security Archive. She was president of the Association for Library Collections and Technical Services. In 2000 she was named to the ALA's National Advocacy Honor Roll. She was elected a lifetime member of the Yaddo community in 2006.

== Publications ==
- Ask Me about DELCAT: A Self-Paced Workbook to DELCAT Technical Services (with Kirstin Antelman)
- Treasures of the University of Delaware Library: A Catalog and Exhibit (1986, with Alice D. Schreyer)
- The Two-millionth Volume: In Celebration (1992, with James O. Freedman)
- Hugh MacDiarmid: An Exhibition Celebrating the Centenary of His Birth (1992, with A. N. Bold and T. Murray)
- Ernest Hemingway in His Time: An Exhibition (1995)
- Self Works: Diaries, Scrapbooks, and Other Autobiographical Efforts: Catalog of an Exhibition (1997, with L. R. J. Melvin)
- Paul Bowles, 1910-1999: Catalog of an Exhibition (2000, with David P. Roselle, V. S. Carr, T. Murray, and L. R. J. Melvin)
- Ezra Pound in His Time and Beyond: The Influence of Ezra Pound on Twentieth-century Poetry: a Catalog of an Exhibition (2006, with D. P. Roselle, D. Rich, and J. Rossa)

== Personal life ==
Susan Dieckmann married historian William Everett Brynteson in Wisconsin in 1958; they later divorced. She died in 2025, at the age of 89.
