= Solutions journalism =

Approach to reporting

Solutions journalism is an approach to news reporting that focuses on the responses to social issues as well as the problems themselves. Solutions stories, anchored in credible evidence, explain how and why responses are working, or not working. The goal of this journalistic approach is to present people with a truer, more complete view of these issues, helping to drive more effective citizenship.

== Definition and theory ==
Solutions journalism is rigorous, evidence-based reporting on the responses to social problems. Solutions stories can take many forms, but they share several key characteristics. They identify the root causes of a social problem; prominently highlight a response, or responses, to that problem; present evidence of the impact of that response; and explain how and why the response is working, or not working. When possible, solutions stories also present an insight that helps people better understand how complex systems work, and how they can be improved.

Proponents of solutions journalism distinguish the approach from so-called "good news" reporting, which can be characterized by a superficial presentation of a response without careful analysis or examination of whether the response is effective. Solutions stories assess responses that are working today, as opposed to untested theories—and they tend to place more emphasis on the innovation than on a person or institution responsible for that innovation.

Solutions journalism supporters believe that it provides important feedback that allows society to see credible possibilities and respond more successfully to emerging challenges. Compelling reporting about responses to social problems, they say, can strengthen society by increasing the circulation of knowledge necessary for citizens to engage powerfully with issues in their communities, and for communities, leaders, innovators, and philanthropists to make appropriate, informed decisions on policies and investments.

Simply reporting on problems, some research shows, can reduce citizens' sense of efficacy, leading them to disengage from public life. In a 2008 study, the Associated Press found that young people were tired of news, which they perceived as being negative and lacking resolution. This resulted in "news fatigue", in which people tended to tune out from news media rather than engage. Solutions journalism posits that reporting on ways that problems are being addressed can increase engagement among audiences, enhances a sense of efficacy, and fosters constructive discourse around controversial issues.

Solutions journalism practitioners say the approach augments and complements the press' traditional watchdog role, presenting citizens with a more complete view of issues. In addition, they say, it can enhance the impact of investigative reporting, by presenting evidence that entrenched problems can, in fact, be solved.

Proponents of solutions journalism distinguish the practice from civic journalism, a movement that gained some momentum in the United States in the 1990s by advocating for a more active role for journalism in the democratic process.

== History ==
As early as 1998, journalists noted the emergence of a new kind of journalism that examined what people and institutions were doing to address social problems. Some journalism critics observed that the governing assumptions of traditional journalism—anchored in the belief that a reporter's job is to expose wrongdoing—might not be universally valid. Simply reporting on problems, it began to appear, might not be the cure to all the world's social woes.

Other forms of journalism have similarly responded to a perceived excess of negativity in news media. Civic journalism, which gained some momentum in the United States in the 1990s, seeks to engage readers in public discourse in order to encourage active participation in the democratic process and catalyze change. Solutions journalism is also related to similar journalistic styles that have been practiced outside the United States, including "constructive journalism", which originated in Denmark.

In 2003, the French NGO Reporters d'Espoirs, (Reporters of Hope) is created as a network of journalists and media professionals who want to "promote solutions-based news in the media". The organization is officially launched at UNESCO in 2004 with the Reporters d'Espoirs Awards. They promote the concept of "info-solution" and "journalisme de solutions", working with all kind of media to spread initiatives among the general public. Over the years, they demonstrated solutions-based editorial lines -with newspapers like Libération, Ouest-France, TV programs like TF1- generate audiences and interest among citizens.

Worldchanging, an online magazine founded in 2003, declared its approach to reporting on and debating environmental issues to be based in the coverage of solutions.

The Tyee, a Canadian news site founded by David Beers in 2003, includes a Solutions section. In 2006 The Tyee created Solutions Reporting Fellowships, raising money from readers to fund freelance journalist projects. An independent panel selected recipients until the program ended in 2013. In 2009 Beers and Tyee business director Michelle Hoar created the non-profit Tyee Solutions Society, which produces solutions journalism series published in The Tyee and with other media.

In the beginning of 2010, Robert Costanza, David Orr, Ida Kubiszewski and others, launched Solutions, a non-profit print and online publication devoted to showcasing ideas for solving the world's integrated ecological, social, and economic problems. Solutions' rule of thumb for all articles is no more than one-third of the paper should describe the problem, while at least two-thirds should be devoted to solutions. Over the years, as readership has steadily increased, Solutions has formed partnership with organizations around the world, including 350.org, Club of Rome, David Suzuki Foundation, National Policy Consensus Center (NPCC), US Environmental Protection Agency (EPA), Seventh Generation, Inc., Stockholm Resilience Centre, World Future Council, and many others.

In 2010, journalists David Bornstein and Tina Rosenberg also created the "Fixes" column for The New York Times' Opinionator section. "Fixes" is a weekly, deeply reported examination of the response to an urgent social problem. Reader response to "Fixes" has been strong, leading Bornstein and Rosenberg, with journalist Courtney Martin, to co-found the Solutions Journalism Network, an independent, non-profit organization with a mission to make solutions journalism a part of mainstream practice in news.

=== In Ukraine ===
Solutions journalism in Ukraine was firstly used as a ground approach in the Rubryka online media. It became the first Ukrainian media which actively develops this approach and is openly positioning itself as a solutions media since 2020. Rubryka was founded in 2018 by Anastasia Rudenko, a Ukrainian journalist, as a socio-political online media with an emphasis on the topics of ecology, urbanism and women's rights.

== Criticism ==
Journalists and readers sometimes respond negatively to the solutions approach. One common criticism is that solutions journalism easily devolves into "feel-good" storytelling or hero worship, rather than critically examining important issues in society. In fact, some news organizations have created specific sections to highlight upbeat "good news", which can help generate advertiser or sponsor revenue. Proponents of solutions journalism argue that such stories do not represent rigorous, evidence-based reporting.

Critics of solutions journalism also have voiced concerns regarding potential bias and advocacy. There is a fine line, they suggest, between reporting on responses and actually advocating on their behalf. Solutions journalism supporters respond that an evidence-based approach to reporting diminishes the risk of bias, and that solutions stories should not be connected to a "call to action" for readers.

Others worry that many complex social issues do not have clear causes or clear solutions. This may require reporters pursuing solutions stories to have considerable expertise in a subject area—and, even then, some believe that the resulting stories will inevitably be too simplistic relative to the reality of a systemic problem.

== Proponents ==
The Solutions Journalism Network works, it says, "to legitimize and spread the practice of solutions journalism: rigorous and compelling reporting about responses to social problems". To achieve its mission, SJN works with journalists in a variety of ways to build awareness and the practice of solutions reporting. The Solutions Journalism Network has collaborated with numerous news organizations in the United States, including The Seattle Times, The Christian Science Monitor, The Boston Globe, PRI's "The World," and the Center for Investigative Reporting, to produce solutions-oriented reporting projects. Positivas based in Argentina is the first BCorp certified media in Latin America, and has been working to pioneer Construction Journalism on radio and multimedia content online since 2003. Journalist Andrea Méndez Brandam, founder and host, has been inspired and coached by Shauna Crockett Burrows, Positive News UK founder.

== Examples ==
- https://www.latimes.com/nation/la-na-healthcare-collaboration-20140319-dto-htmlstory.html
- https://kaiserhealthnews.org/news/san-antonio-model-mental-health-system/
- https://old.seattletimes.com/html/education/2025538481_edlabrestorativejusticexml.html
- pri.org
- https://www.ocregister.com/articles/police-383818-prostitution-santa.html
- http://www.noticiaspositivas.org
- https://www.reportersdespoirs.org
