= Tina Rosenberg =

American journalist

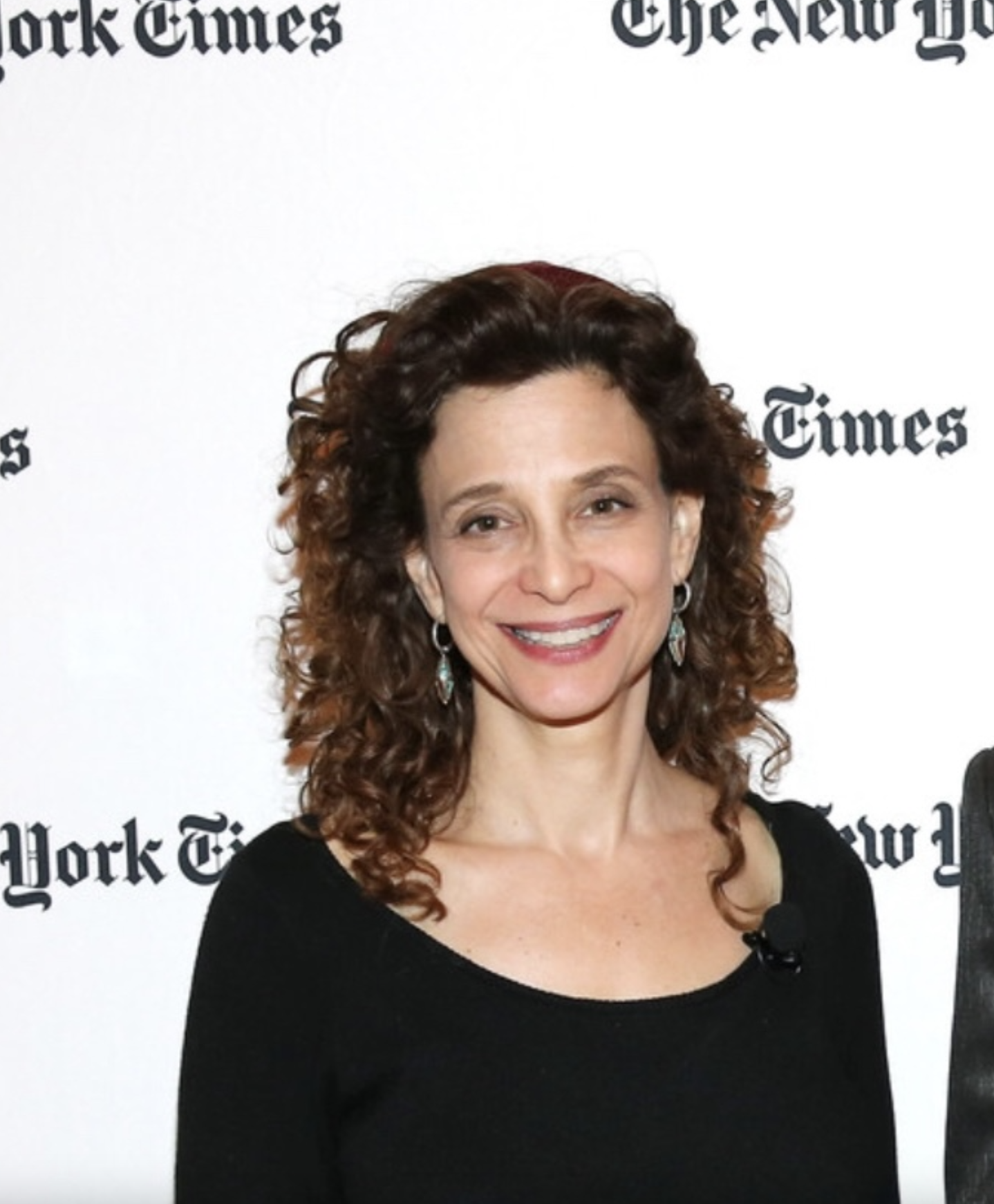
- Tina Rosenberg in 2019
- Born: April 14, 1960 (age 66); Brooklyn, New York
- Education: Northwestern University (B.S., M.S.)
- Occupations: Journalist, author
- Years active: 1985–present
- Relatives: Barnett Rosenberg

Tina Rosenberg (born April 14, 1960) is an American journalist and the author of three books. For one of them, The Haunted Land: Facing Europe's Ghosts After Communism (1995), she won the Pulitzer Prize for General Nonfiction and the National Book Award for Nonfiction. She also won a 1987 MacArthur award.

Rosenberg was born in Brooklyn, New York. She is a longtime New York Times writer and, since 2010, co-author of the New York Times "Fixes" column. The column, written with David Bornstein, is an example of solutions journalism — rigorous reporting on how people are responding to problems. Bornstein, Rosenberg and Courtney Martin founded the Solutions Journalism Network in 2013. The organization works with news organizations to help them add solutions reporting to their coverage.

She grew up in Holt, Michigan, and earned her bachelor's and master's degrees from Northwestern University. She was living in Latin America in 1987 when she won a MacArthur Fellowship. Her experiences there led to her first published book, Children of Cain: Violence and the Violent in Latin America (1991).

Rosenberg has also written hundreds of magazine articles, for such publications as The New Yorker, Foreign Policy, Rolling Stone, The New Republic, and The Washington Post.

Between 1997 and 2007 she was an editorial writer for The New York Times, specializing in international issues. She has also been a contributing editor at The New York Times Magazine.

Her latest book is Join the Club: How Peer Pressure Can Transform the World (2011).

== Books ==
External videos
- Booknotes interview with Rosenberg on Children of Cain, November 10, 1991, C-SPAN

- Children of Cain: Violence and the Violent in Latin America (Random House, 1991)
- The Haunted Land: Facing Europe's Ghosts After Communism (Random House, 1996)
- Join the Club: How Peer Pressure Can Transform the World (W.W. Norton, 2011)
