= Torsten Stiig Jansen =

Danish journalist

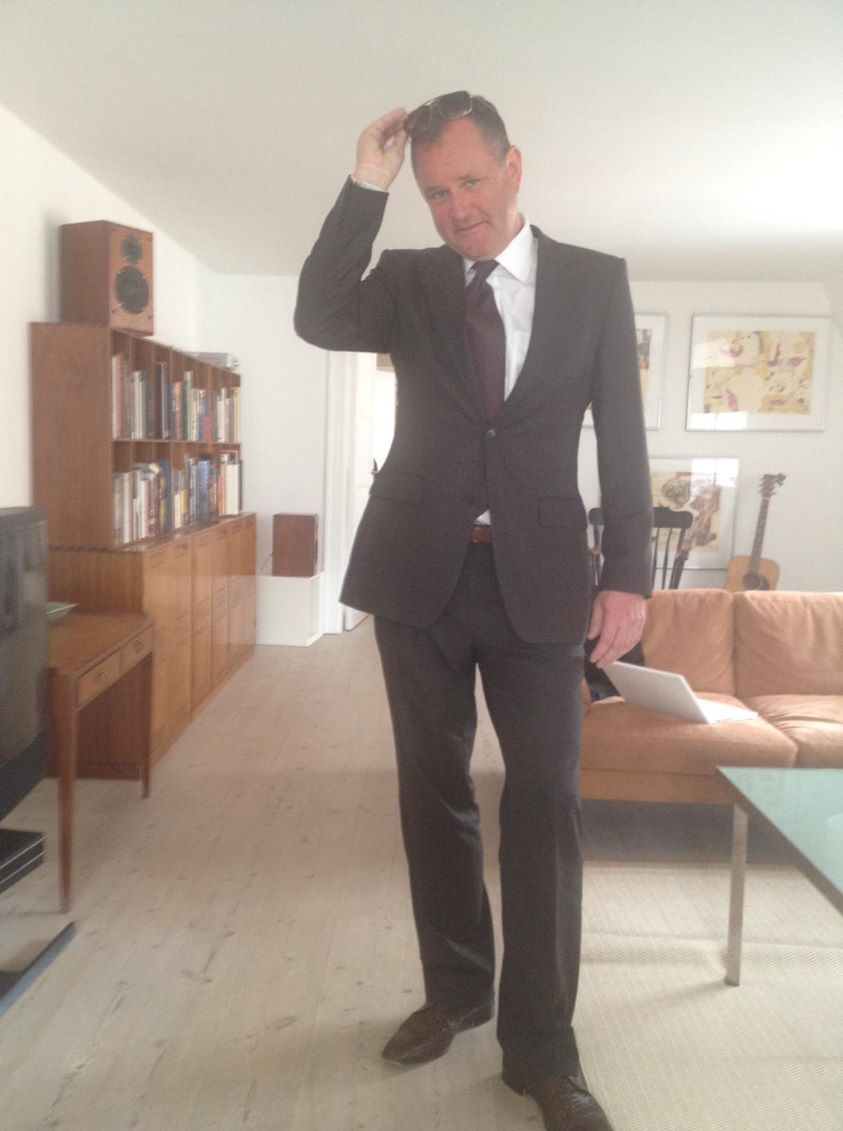
- Jansen in Copenhagen, 2012
- Born: 24 July 1963 (age 62); Virum, Denmark
- Education: Danish School of Journalism; CBS Executive Board Leadership Master Degree
- Occupations: Journalist, diplomat, lobbyist, author, public affairs advisor, US analyst, speaker
- Notable credit(s): TV Avisen, Magasinet Søndag, DR
- Spouse: Cathrine Gyldensted
- Website: www.leadagency.dk

Torsten Stiig Jansen (born 24 July 1963) is a Danish journalist, author, US commentator, public affairs advisor, and former diplomat. He has worked for Ekstra Bladet and DR as a foreign news reporter, US correspondent, Head of Foreign News, and news presenter at TV Avisen. In 2007, he left DR after being appointed Minister-Counsellor and cultural attaché at the Embassy of Denmark in Washington, D.C..

He is currently an associate partner at the public affairs bureau LEAD Agency in Copenhagen, where he advises international companies and organizations on US relations, communication and public affairs.

He is active on Instagram as @therealtorstenjansen, where he describes himself as “Journalist, author, USA-nørd, TV-veteran og ex-diplomat.”

== Early life and career ==
Jansen was born in Virum, the son of associate professor Jytte (née Qvist) and manufacturer Lars Stiig Jansen. He was a resident of Søllerød. He enrolled at Virum Gymnasium in 1980–1983. He launched a short-lived art gallery project in 1985 called "En Jansen og Nørgaard Udstilling" with his high school friend, fashion designer Mads Nørgaard. He studied journalism at the Danish School of Journalism from 1986 to 1990.

== Career ==
Jansen began his career as a foreign news journalist at Ekstra Bladet, travelling extensively in Eastern Europe covering the historical political changes beginning with the Revolutions of 1989 and the breakdown of the Berlin Wall. Together with Jan Grarup, war photographer, Jansen reported on the Balkan Wars from Croatia, Serbia and Kosovo.

As a young reporter in 1990–1993, he covered the dissolution of the Soviet Union, the Bosnian War, and the Siege of Sarajevo. He reported from Moscow during the 1991 Soviet coup d'état attempt against Mikhail Gorbachev. He also covered the Rwandan genocide and the release of Nelson Mandela.

In 1992, during Mandela’s Scandinavian tour, Jansen interviewed Nelson Mandela in Copenhagen as the only Scandinavian journalist.

Jansen served as DR’s US Correspondent from 1996 to 2001, covering the 1996 United States presidential election, the Clinton–Lewinsky scandal, the 2000 United States presidential election in Florida and the 2000 United States presidential election recount in Florida.

In 2001, he became Head of Foreign News at DR, and from 2004 to 2007 he was a news presenter at TV Avisen.

From 2007 to 2011, Jansen served at the Danish Embassy in Washington, D.C., working on US–Danish climate relations ahead of the 2009 United Nations Climate Change Conference (COP15). His office coordinated multiple royal visits by Frederik, Crown Prince of Denmark, Mary, Crown Princess of Denmark, and the 2011 official US visit by Margrethe II of Denmark and Henrik, Prince Consort of Denmark.

=== Public affairs and US analysis ===
In 2013, Jansen joined LEAD Agency as a senior advisor. He has since advised global and Danish companies on political communication, international positioning, and public affairs strategy.

Since 2019, Jansen has been a regular US-politics pundit for TV2 NEWS.

=== Books and speaking work ===
Jansen has co-written several books on American politics. In 2020, Gyldendal published Sprækker, his analysis of Danish–US relations told through interviews with all living Danish Prime Ministers.

He is a sought-after speaker on:

- American politics
- Trends in US-Danish relations
- Foreign policy
- Strategic communication and global positioning
- The future of democracy and media narratives

His talks are offered through several professional speaker bureaus.
