= Perfect Girls, Starving Daughters =

2007 book by Courtney E. Martin

Perfect Girls, Starving Daughters; The Frightening New Normalcy of Hating Your Body
- Author: Courtney E. Martin
- Language: English
- Genre: Psychology
- Publisher: Piatkus
- Publication date: 2007
- Publication place: United States
- ISBN: 978-0-3494-0471-4

Perfect Girls, Starving Daughters; The Frightening New Normalcy of Hating Your Body is a book written by Courtney E. Martin, published by Piatkus in 2007, which looks at socio-cultural, psychological and historical influences that encourage eating disorders in young girls and women.
