= Innovations (journal) =

- Discipline: Entrepreneurship
- Language: English
- Edited by: Philip E. Auerswald, Iqbal Z. Quadir

Publication details
- History: 2006-present
- Publisher: MIT Press for George Mason University School of Public Policy, John F. Kennedy School of Government, and Legatum Center for Development and Entrepreneurship at MIT (United States)
- Frequency: Quarterly
- Open access: yes

Standard abbreviations
- ISO 4: Innovations

Indexing
- ISSN: 1558-2477 (print); 1558-2485 (web)
- OCLC no.: 61688870

Links
- Journal homepage; Current Issue

Innovations is a peer-reviewed academic journal that focuses on entrepreneurial solutions to global challenges. It is published quarterly by the MIT Press.

== History ==
Innovations published its first issue in 2006. It complements existing policy journals such as Foreign Affairs by focusing on micro-level solutions, innovations, and entrepreneurship in a variety of organizational settings. The editors are Philip E. Auerswald and Iqbal Z. Quadir.

== Partnerships and special editions ==
The journal is jointly hosted at George Mason University's School of Public Policy, Harvard's John F. Kennedy School of Government, and MIT's Legatum Center for Development and Entrepreneurship. Working with the Schwab Foundation for Social Entrepreneurship, Innovations has produced special editions for the 2008 annual meeting of the World Economic Forum and the 2008 World Economic Forum on the Middle East (in Arabic and English).

== Structure of the journal ==
Each issue of Innovations consists of four sections:

- Lead essay. An authoritative figure addresses an issue relating to innovation, emphasizing interactions between technology and governance in a global context. Authors of lead essays have included Fazle Hasan Abed, Percy Barnevik, Peter Eigen, William Foege, John Holdren, Laurie Garrett, R. Gopalakrishan (executive director of the Tata Group), Mary Robinson, Diego Rodriguez (a partner at IDEO), Klaus Schwab, and Lawrence Summers.
- Cases authored by innovators. Case narratives of innovations are authored either by, or in collaboration with, the innovators themselves. See further description below.
- Analysis. Research articles that emphasize links between practice and policy—alternately, micro and macro scales of analysis. The development of meaningful indicators of the impact of innovations is an area of editorial emphasis. Authors in the analysis section have included Bill Drayton, Paul Farmer, and Maria Otero.
- Perspectives on policy. Analyses of innovations by large scale public actors—national governments and transnational organizations—address both success and failure of policy, informed by both empirical evidence and the experience of policy innovators. The development of improved modes of governance to facilitate and support innovations is an area of editorial focus. Authors in the perspectives on policy section have included Susan Davis, Francis Fukuyama, Vinod Khosla, Geoff Mulgan, Richard R. Nelson, John Ruggie, and Tim Wirth.

=== Cases authored by innovators ===
A differentiating feature of Innovations is that the case about innovators addressing global challenges are authored by the innovators themselves. Each includes discussion of motivations, challenges, strategies, outcomes, and unintended consequences. Following each case narrative, we present commentary by an academic discussant. The discussant highlights the aspects of the innovation that are analytically most interesting, have the most significant implications for policy, and/or best illustrate reciprocal relationships between technology and governance.

Authors and co-authors of Innovations case narratives and discussions have included Seth Berkley, Larry Brilliant, John Elkington, Matt Flannery (co-founder of Kiva (organization)), Peter Gabriel, Robin Hanson, Marcin Jakubowski, Richard Anthony Jefferson, Victoria Hale, Cory Ondrejka, and Bunker Roy.
