= Solutions Journalism Network =

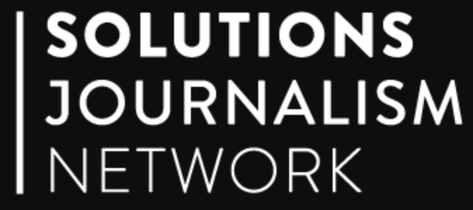
- Formation: 2013
- Founder: David Bornstein (author), Courtney E. Martin, and Tina Rosenberg
- Type: Non-profit
- Website: www.solutionsjournalism.org

The Solutions Journalism Network (SJN) is an independent, non-profit organization that advocates an approach of solutions journalism, an evidence-based mode of reporting on the responses to social problems. It was founded in 2013 by David Bornstein, Courtney E. Martin, and Tina Rosenberg. Its staff in New York City and Oakland, California, help journalists and news organizations across the country understand, value, and build the capacity to do solutions-oriented reporting.

The mission of SJN is "to spread the practice of solutions journalism: rigorous and compelling reporting about responses to social problems". What SJN calls solutions journalism is preceded by very similar journalistic styles that have been practiced outside the United States, including "constructive journalism", which originated in Denmark.

== History ==
The Solutions Journalism Network grew out of the "Fixes" column in The New York Times Opinionator section written by journalists David Bornstein and Tina Rosenberg since October 2010. Together with Courtney Martin, an author, speaker, blogger and frequent contributor to "Fixes", they established SJN in February 2013.

SJN's first major project was a collaboration with The Seattle Times to produce a year-long series of solutions-oriented stories about public education called Education Lab. This initiative was extended for a second year. In its first year, SJN also launched a series of funds to provide financial support to journalists pursuing solutions stories on topics concerning climate change resilience, social and emotional learning, and women's economic equity.

== Philosophy ==
SJN believes that most news reporting fails to fulfill journalism's mission to hold an accurate mirror up to society. While traditional journalism holds that a reporter's primary role is to expose problems, SJN argues that the press should also examine examples of responses to those problems, with the same degree of rigor. These responses, it holds, are an important part of what is happening in the world, and accurate coverage of society must include them to be able to provide the whole story.

SJN attempts to distinguish solutions journalism from "happy news", fluff or advocacy. By covering how people are attempting to solve problems, and writing objectively about the associated evidence of failure or success, solutions journalism seeks to provide information of value to society. SJN argues that such reporting strengthens the watchdog function of journalism: if some people have found newsworthy responses to a problem, it removes the excuses of those who are behaving badly.

SJN also argues that a steady diet of problem-focused reporting makes citizens passive, apathetic and disengaged. Research shows that news that is only about what's wrong with the world causes readers to disengage.

For example, one study shows that negative messages about the impending environmental disaster of climate change make people less likely to take action, not more likely.

SJN posits that readers are more likely to engage when they can learn about newsworthy attempts to solve problems. These stories elicit positive emotions that are different than the heartwarming emotions produced by "happy news" stories. Instead, they make readers feel a sense of empowerment — a productive emotion for civic engagement.

Research by the University of Texas' Engaging News Project compared the responses of study participants who read traditional problem-focused stories or the same stories with a solutions component added. Readers of the solutions stories were, by large margins, more likely to feel inspired and optimistic, get involved in working towards a solution, share the article and want to read more articles in the same publication.

The Seattle Times has found similar results when surveying readers about its Ed Lab stories.

=== Newsroom engines ===
SJN works with news organizations to build solutions-oriented coverage of health and violence. Examples of newsrooms in these projects are the Detroit Free Press; KPCC, a public radio station in Los Angeles; and The World, a radio program distributed by the Public Radio Exchange.

The Health Engine project helps journalists find "positive deviants" in health databases, as opposed to focusing on negative outliers. SJN provides participating newsrooms with workshops, data and research help and funding at various levels, most of it modest amounts for travel.

The health project was a winner of the Knight News Challenge, and has also received funding from the California HealthCare Foundation. The Violence Engine is funded by the Robert Wood Johnson Foundation.

=== Education coverage ===
In October 2013, the Seattle Times launched a series of education-related articles, documentaries, and guest opinion pieces written from a solutions standpoint. The Times, with SJN's support, assigned two journalists to the project full-time. They write a major feature article each month addressing perennial issues with education, like dropout rates, attendance, parent involvement. They also produce an Education Lab blog, which now attracts over 60,000 views each month.

Responses from a survey taken of Seattle Times readers indicated that people are aware of the campaign and feel that the solutions stories being run are different from traditional journalism. Other results indicated that people are more likely to share, act on, or change their think about an issue due to the solutions stories they read. Some respondents stated that they felt that the solutions journalism was biased, while others said they were happy with the positive approach to issue.

=== Toolkit ===
In January 2015, the SJN released a downloadable "Solutions Journalism Toolkit" intended to help educate journalists interested in emphasizing solutions in their work. The 48-page toolkit walks readers through the ins and outs of solutions journalism, including what solutions journalism is and what it is not, and how to write solutions stories.

=== Curriculum ===
SJN, in partnership with Temple University's School of Media and Communication, is developing courses for journalism students. It has also collaborated with the Poynter Institute to produce a free solutions journalism webinar on Poynter's NewU site. SJN and Poynter are now developing a free interactive online course in solutions journalism.

== Funding ==
SJN has received funding from:

- Annie E. Casey Foundation
- California Health Care Foundation
- Joseph J. Dyer
- Einhorn Family Charitable Trust
- Emerson Collective
- Bill and Melinda Gates Foundation
- Innovate Foundation
- William and Flora Hewlett Foundation
- John S. and James L. Knight Foundation
- Nellie Mae Educational Foundation
- NoVo Foundation
- Onward and Upward: A Charitable Trust
- Peery Foundation
- Pulitzer Center on Crisis Reporting
- Rita Allen Foundation
- Rockefeller Foundation
- Silicon Valley Community Foundation
- William James Foundation
- Lutzker & Lutzker LLP
- Mayer Brown LLP
- Seyfarth Shaw LLP

=== Collaborating institutions ===
- The Institute for Health Metrics and Evaluation at the University of Washington
- John Jay College of Criminal Justice in the City University of New York
- The Goldman School of Public Policy at the University of California-Berkeley
