= Positive News =

Media brand and quarterly magazine, based in the United Kingdom

- Type: Quarterly magazine, daily online
- Founder: Shauna Crockett-Burrows
- Publisher: Positive News Publishing Limited
- Editor-in-chief: Lucy Purdy
- Founded: 1993
- Relaunched: 2016
- Language: English
- Headquarters: 24 Greencoat Place, London SW1P 1RD
- Circulation: 15,000
- Website: positive.news

Positive News is a constructive journalism media brand. It publishes independent journalism online and in print, and aims to help create a more inspiring news medium.

== Publisher ==
Positive News is published by Positive News Publishing Ltd, a not-for-profit company with a remote working team based in the United Kingdom. The company is a subsidiary of Positive News Limited, a community benefit society.

== History ==
Positive News was founded in 1993 by Shauna Crockett-Burrows as a quarterly newspaper, and she soon after established Positive News Trust, a registered educational charity.

In 2015, Positive News chief executive Sean Wood established a co-operative as the parent organisation of Positive News' publishing company. Positive News was the first media cooperative in the world to offer community shares globally through crowdfunding. In January 2016, it was relaunched as a magazine.

== See also ==
- Yes! (U.S. magazine)
