= The Haunted Land =

1995 book by Tina Rosenberg

The Haunted Land: Facing Europe's Ghosts After Communism
- Author: Tina Rosenberg
- Language: English
- Publisher: Random House
- Publication date: 1995

The Haunted Land: Facing Europe's Ghosts After Communism written by Tina Rosenberg and published by Random House in 1995, won the 1996 Pulitzer Prize for General Nonfiction and the 1995 National Book Award for Nonfiction.
