= J. Courtney Sullivan =

American novelist

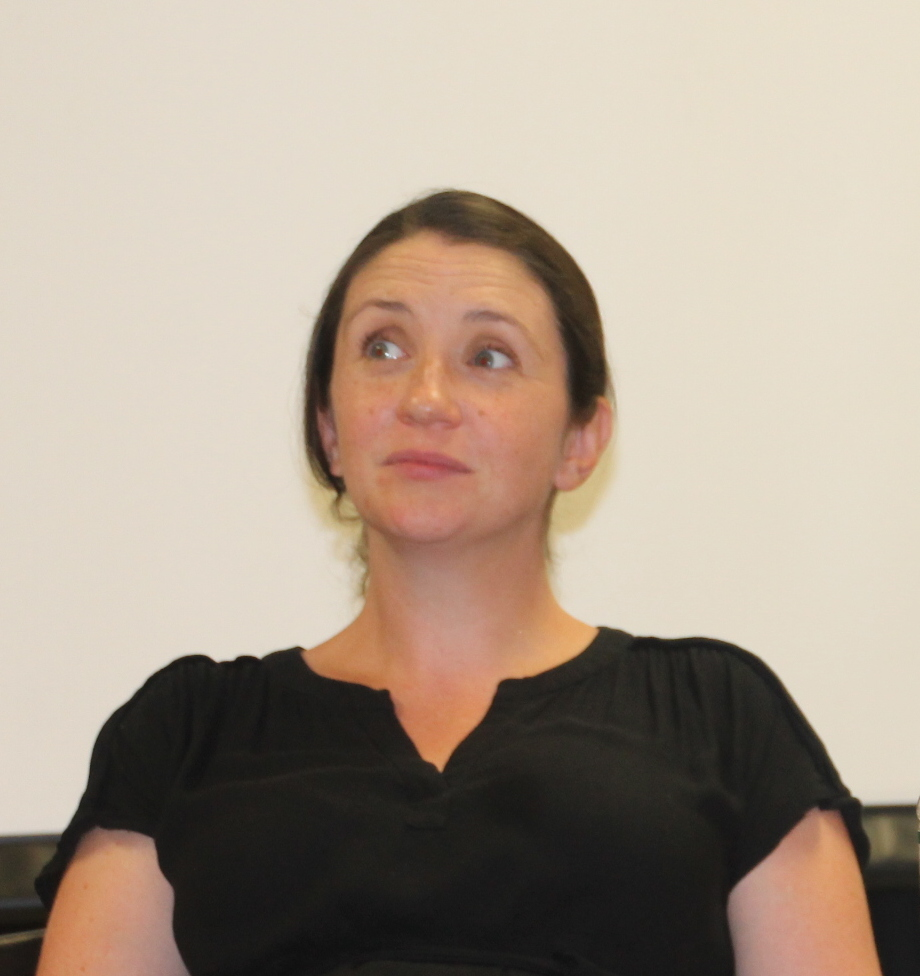
- Sullivan in 2018
- Born: 1982 (age 43–44); Massachusetts, United States
- Education: Smith College
- Occupations: Writer, novelist
- Writing career
- Period: 2007–present
- Website: www.jcourtneysullivan.com

Julie Courtney Sullivan (born 1982), better known as J. Courtney Sullivan, is an American novelist and former writer for The New York Times.

== Biography ==
Sullivan grew up outside Boston, Massachusetts. She attended Smith College in Northampton, Massachusetts, where she majored in Victorian literature and received the Ellen M. Hatfield Memorial Prize for best short story, the Norma M. Leas prize for excellence in written English, and the Jeanne MacFarland Prize for excellent work in Women's Studies.

She graduated in 2003, then moved to New York City and began working at Allure. Sullivan later moved to The New York Times, where she worked for four years. Her writing has since appeared in The New York Times Book Review, the Chicago Tribune, New York magazine, the New York Observer, Men's Vogue, Elle, and Glamour, among many others.

Sullivan comes from an Irish-Catholic family where many of the women go by their middle rather than first names. Her first piece for Allure was published under the name "Courtney Sullivan," but she added the J back in shortly thereafter.

She self-identifies as a feminist, a stance that has been reflected in both her fiction and nonfiction work. In 2006, she wrote a piece for the New York Times "Modern Love" column about her experiences in the dating world, and in 2010 she co-edited a feminist essay collection titled Click: When We Knew We Were Feminists. Her novels deal prominently with relationships between female characters. In 2017, Sullivan wrote the foreword to a new edition of one of her childhood favorites, Anne of Green Gables, published by Penguin Classics.

Sullivan lives with her husband, Kevin Johannesen, and their son, in Carroll Gardens, Brooklyn. She was raised Roman Catholic. Sullivan now considers herself a "lapsed Catholic," but still prays and visits an abbey on retreats.

== Novels ==
=== Commencement ===
In 2010, Sullivan published her first novel, Commencement, which focuses on the experiences of four friends at Smith College, Sullivan's alma mater. She wrote 15 different drafts of the book before sending it to her editor, after which it underwent two or three more revisions.

Commencement received positive reviews from many major publications and became a New York Times bestseller. Feminist icon Gloria Steinem described the novel as "generous-hearted, brave...Commencement makes clear that the feminist revolution is just beginning".

In 2011, Oprah's Book Club included Commencement in a list of "5 Feminist Classics to (Re)read as a Mom, Wife and Writer".

=== Maine ===
Sullivan's second novel, Maine, deals with four women from three different generations of an Irish family named the Kellehers. The foursome includes: Alice, the stubborn and opinionated matriarch who is dealing with the guilt she has over a tragedy in the past; Ann Marie, who married into the family and is nursing her newfound love for creating dollhouses; Katherine, Alice's eldest daughter who has commuted from California to be with her daughter, Maggie; and Maggie, a kindhearted 32-year-old from New York who is dealing with her pregnancy. Each woman's world collides while spending the summer at a beachfront cottage in New England. Though Sullivan did not base the fictional family directly on her own Irish-Catholic family, she drew on her own childhood experiences while writing the novel.

Maine was named a Best Book of the Year by the Washington Post and one of the top ten fiction books of 2011 by TIME magazine. It was a New York Times bestseller, and has sold half a million copies since its publication.

=== The Engagements ===
The Engagements follows a five characters, who experience love and marriage. The novel spans roughly a century, exploring the different wants and desires people feel in relationships.

Reese Witherspoon's production company picked up the rights to The Engagements before the book was even published. Fox 2000 signed on to make the film soon thereafter. The Engagements was a New York Times bestseller, and was named a best book of the year by People Magazine and the Irish Times. It has been published in 17 countries.

=== Saints For All Occasions ===
Sullivan's fourth novel was named one of the ten best books of the year by the Washington Post, a New York Times Critic's Pick for 2017 and was a finalist for the New England Book Award. Richard Russo said, "I hope to read another novel as strong and wise and beautiful and heartbreaking as Saints For All Occasions this year, but I'm not sure I will."

== Books ==
=== Fiction ===
- Sullivan, J. Courtney (2009). Commencement. New York, NY: Knopf. ISBN 978-0-307-27074-0.
- Sullivan, J. Courtney (2011). Maine. Knopf. ISBN 978-0-307-59512-6.
- Sullivan, J. Courtney (May 20, 2014). The Engagements. Vintage. ISBN 978-0-307-94922-6.
- Sullivan, J. Courtney (2017). Saints for All Occasions. Knopf. ISBN 978-0-307-95957-7.
- Sullivan, J. Courtney (2020). Friends and Strangers. New York: Knopf. ISBN 978-0-525-52059-7.
- Sullivan, J. Courtney (July 2, 2024). The Cliffs. Knopf. ISBN 978-0-593-31915-4.

=== Nonfiction ===
- The Secret Currency of Love (2009) (contributing essayist)
- Click: When We Knew We Were Feminists (2010) (co-editor with Courtney E. Martin)
- Foreword to the classic novel Anne of Green Gables (2017)
