= David Bornstein (author) =

American writer

- Born: Montreal, Quebec, Canada
- Occupation: Journalist

David Bornstein is a journalist and author who specializes in writing about social innovation, using a style called solutions journalism. He has written three books on social entrepreneurship. He writes for the Fixes blog for The New York Times website, and is one of the co-founders of the Solutions Journalism Network.

== Personal ==
Bornstein was raised in Montreal, Quebec, Canada, and now lives in New York City.

== Family ==
Bornstein is married, and he and his wife have one child, a son.

== Awards ==
He was awarded the 2007 Human Security Award for work in social entrepreneurship on October 25, 2007, which is given annually by the Coalition Advocating Human Security, a program of the University of California, Irvine. He also received the 2008 Leadership in Social Entrepreneurship Award from Duke University's Fuqua School of Business. He is additionally a co-recipient of the 2014 Vision Award, presented by Middlebury College's Center for Social Entrepreneurship.

== Books ==
- Social Entrepreneurship: What Everyone Needs to Know, co-authored with Susan Davis
- How to Change the World: Social Entrepreneurs and the Power of New Ideas
- The Price of a Dream: The Story of the Grameen Bank
