= Constructive journalism =

Journalistic approach emphasising solutions, context and societal possibilities

Constructive journalism is a journalistic approach that seeks to supplement traditional news reporting with solution-focused, contextual, and future-oriented perspectives. Its aim is to counteract news fatigue and news avoidance, negativity bias and disengagement by adding nuance, evidence-based responses, and forward-looking angles to stories about societal challenges. Constructive journalism does not avoid critical reporting but expands it through context, multiple perspectives, and coverage of how individuals, institutions, and communities address problems.

Since the early 2010s, constructive journalism has developed into a recognised international research field and newsroom practice, with interdisciplinary roots in positive psychology, media effects, systems theory, and democratic theory.

Constructive journalism is related to, but distinct from, solutions journalism, civic journalism and restorative narratives. It retains traditional journalistic values such as accuracy and independence, verification, and scrutiny, while broadening reporting to include responses, possibilities, and the societal implications of public problems.

== Definition ==
Constructive journalism is generally defined as journalism that:

- investigates problems alongside responses and solutions,
- provides context, nuance and multiple stakeholder perspectives,
- incorporates forward-looking and explanatory questions,
- highlights progress, agency and evidence-backed initiatives,
- avoids sensationalism, distortion, and binary framing.

Scholars describe the approach as a way to improve audience engagement, trust and democratic participation by offering a fuller and more accurate portrayal of societal conditions. Systematic reviews show constructive approaches can reduce news avoidance and support deeper comprehension, though effects vary by context.

== History ==
=== Early debates and conceptual roots (before 2011) ===
Nordic academics and news leaders began discussing alternatives to a growing negativity bias in news during the 2000s. A key figure was Danish journalist and media executive Ulrik Haagerup, who argued that traditional news values created a distorted image of reality. His book En konstruktiv nyhed (2012) and later Constructive News (2014) helped shape the modern constructive journalism movement.

Haagerup advocated journalism that includes solutions, long-term perspectives, and public value, influencing newsrooms in Denmark and internationally. His work contributed to the establishment of the Constructive Institute in 2017, where he served as CEO.

=== Academic development and institutionalisation (2011–2017) ===
The field became academically grounded through the work of Danish researcher and journalist Cathrine Gyldensted, who connected journalism with positive psychology, systemic questioning, and dialogic methods.

Key milestones include:

- Gyldensted’s book From Mirrors to Movers (2015), which proposed a set of constructive elements in news practice,
- the Handbook of Constructive Journalism (2014), which compiled early Nordic newsroom experiments,
- research programmes at Windesheim University of Applied Sciences in the Netherlands,
- the first PhD dissertation on constructive journalism by Karen McIntyre at the University of North Carolina at Chapel Hill (2015),
- the foundation of the Constructive Institute at Aarhus University in 2017.

=== Expansion and global professionalisation (2017–present) ===
From 2017 onward, constructive journalism expanded internationally in:

- public service media (such as DR, TV 2 Denmark, NRK, SVT, SR, YLE and the BBC),
- European and US newsrooms experimenting with constructive formats,
- academic programmes, fellowships and research centres,
- empirical research on trust, engagement, solutions framing and news fatigue.

In 2024, a Nordic white paper from the University of Southern Denmark (SDU) and Nord University provided a comprehensive overview of the field’s goals, methods and models.

== Key contributors ==
=== Researchers ===
- Ulrik Haagerup – Nordic pioneer; author of Constructive News; founder of the Constructive Institute.
- Cathrine Gyldensted – early academic grounding via positive psychology and constructive interviewing.
- Karen McIntyre – first PhD on constructive journalism; known for experimental media-effects research.
- Kyser Lough (University of Georgia) – co-author of systematic reviews; curator of a global research repository on constructive and solutions journalism.
- Liesbeth Hermans – co-developer of the six-element constructive journalism framework.
- Peter Bro, Kristina Lund Jørgensen and Jakob Risbro – Nordic researchers on methods, models and newsroom implementation.

=== Practitioners ===
- Gerd Maria May – creator of the Room of Solutions (Løsningsrummet) method; author of From Towers to Squares on participatory, solutions-focused journalism.
- Jesper Borup (DR Fyn) – known for developing constructive regional news formats in Danish public service media.
- Editorial teams at DR, TV 2 Denmark, NRK, SVT, SR, YLE, De Correspondent, Correctiv, Deutsche Welle, and the BBC.

== Theoretical foundations ==
Constructive journalism draws on:

- Positive psychology (hope, agency, efficacy, engagement, and the PERMA model),
- systems theory and interventive interviewing (e.g. the questioning typology of Karl Tomm),
- complexity theory and long-term scenario thinking,
- media effects research on trust, engagement and news fatigue,
- democratic theory on public value and civic participation.

A widely cited model identifies six core elements of constructive journalism: solutions, future orientation, context, inclusivity, empowerment, and co-creation.

== Methods ==
Common methods associated with constructive journalism include:

- constructive interviewing using past- and future-oriented questions,
- solutions-focused research frameworks alongside problem investigation,
- co-creation and participatory journalism (for example, Room of Solutions formats),
- contextual and data-informed storytelling,
- scenario and foresight questions about long-term developments,
- citizen dialogue formats,
- longitudinal “solution tracking” in communities and institutions.

== Applications ==
=== Public service media ===
Constructive journalism has been developed and tested in several public service organisations, including:

- DR (Denmark), where DR Fyn and other regional units have experimented with constructive, citizen-engaged formats,
- TV 2 Denmark’s constructive news initiatives,
- NRK (Norway), SVT and SR (Sweden), YLE (Finland),
- the BBC in the United Kingdom, where “solutions-focused” and constructive segments have been trialled in various programmes.

=== International newsrooms ===
Constructive journalism and related solutions-focused approaches have also appeared in:

- De Correspondent (Netherlands),
- Correctiv and Deutsche Welle (Germany),
- The Washington Post’s “The Optimist” and other features in the United States,
- HuffPost solutions journalism verticals,
- RTBF (Belgium),
- a range of Spanish and Latin American innovation outlets experimenting with constructive formats.

== Research findings ==
Recent systematic reviews and empirical studies suggest constructive journalism can:

- reduce news avoidance and emotional exhaustion,
- improve audience comprehension and perceived relevance,
- increase perceived self-efficacy and sense of agency,
- strengthen trust in some contexts,
- support more nuanced understanding of complex societal issues.

Effects depend on audience demographics, issue type, cultural context and format. Experimental research indicates that constructive stories often perform at least as well as, and sometimes better than, traditional problem-focused news on measures such as engagement, recall and perceived usefulness, though findings are not uniform across all studies.

The most comprehensive publicly available bibliography of research on constructive and solutions journalism is maintained by Kyser Lough.

== Criticism ==
Critiques of constructive journalism include:

- risks of normative or advocacy drift if “solutions” are framed uncritically,
- possible blurring of boundaries between journalism and strategic communication,
- resource and time constraints in newsrooms, especially for daily hard news,
- challenges in adapting constructive methods to fast-paced breaking news coverage,
- concern that solutions narratives may overstate effectiveness or certainty of interventions.

Proponents argue that constructive journalism complements, rather than replaces, traditional critical reporting by adding context, agency and democratic relevance, rather than positivity for its own sake.

== See also ==
- Solutions journalism
- Civic journalism
- Peace journalism
- Positive psychology
- News values
- Media ethics
