= Jodey Arrington =

American politician (born 1972)

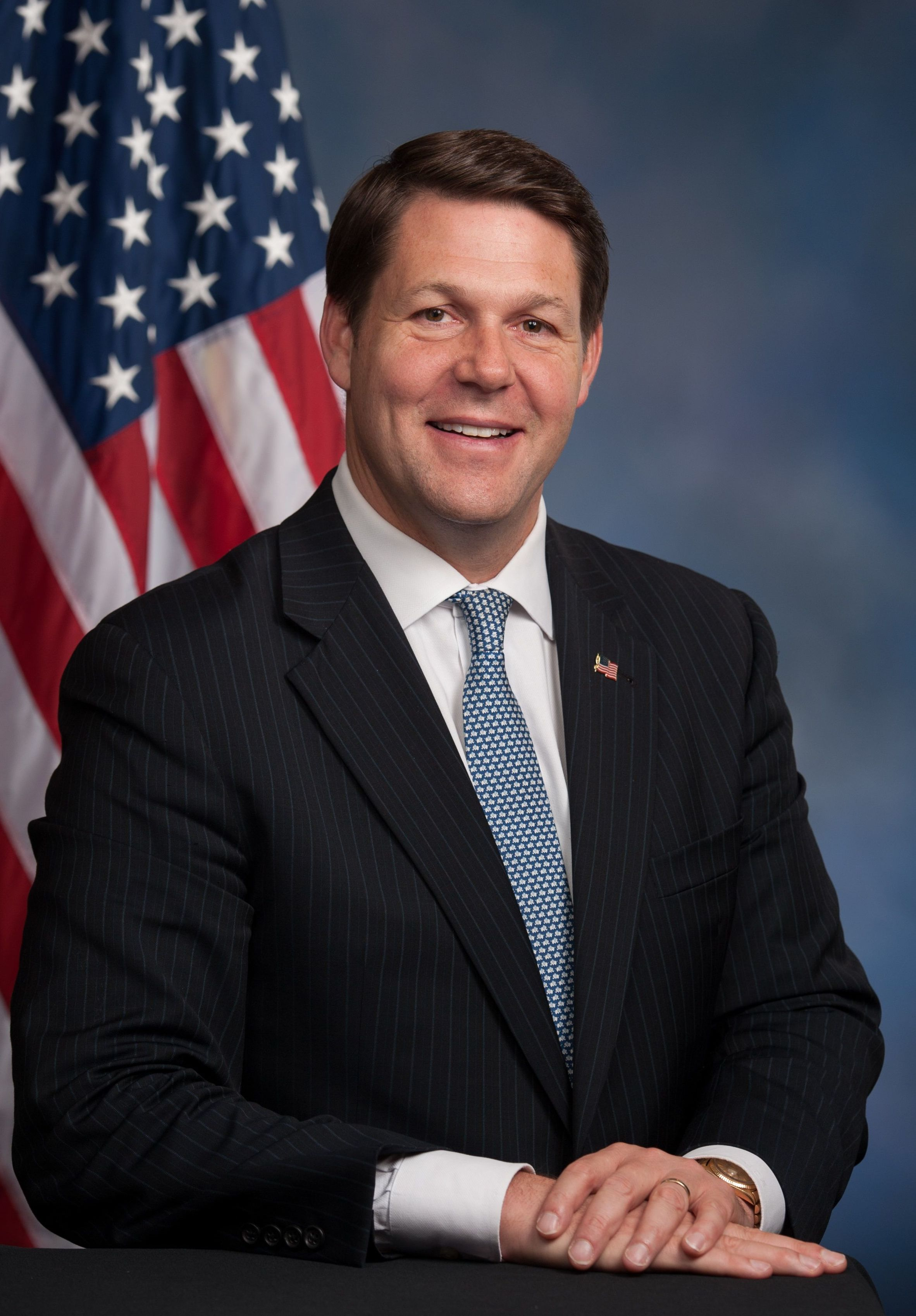
- Official portrait, 2017

Chair of the House Budget Committee
- Incumbent
- Assumed office January 3, 2023
- Preceded by: John Yarmuth

Member of the U.S. House of Representatives from Texas's 19th district
- Incumbent
- Assumed office January 3, 2017
- Preceded by: Randy Neugebauer

Personal details
- Born: Jodey Cook Arrington; March 9, 1972 (age 54) Plainview, Texas, U.S.
- Party: Republican
- Spouses: Nicole Reilly (m. 1995; div. 1999); Priscilla Jones (m. 2002; div. 2007); Anne Meyer (m. 2008)
- Children: 3
- Education: Texas Tech University (BA, MPA)
- Website: House website Campaign website
- Arrington's voice Arrington supporting Republican tax proposals. Recorded September 6, 2018

Jodey Cook Arrington (/ˈɛər.riŋ.tən/ AIR-ring-tən; born March 9, 1972) is an American politician serving as the U.S. representative for Texas's 19th congressional district since 2017. The district includes a large slice of West Texas, centered around Lubbock and Abilene. He is a member of the Republican Party.

Arrington was a member of George W. Bush's gubernatorial and presidential administrations. He was named appointments manager for Governor Bush in 1996. In 2000, he was appointed Special Assistant to the President and Associate Director of Presidential Personnel. In December 2001, Donald E. Powell, the 18th chairman of the Federal Deposit Insurance Corporation, hired Arrington as the agency's chief of staff.

Arrington later served as deputy federal coordinator for the Office of the Federal Coordinator for Gulf Coast Rebuilding. In 2006, he left the coastal rebuilding office to return to his alma mater, Texas Tech University, as its system chief of staff and later vice chancellor for research and commercialization. Until his election to Congress, Arrington was the president of Scott Laboratories in Lubbock.

As a member of Congress, Arrington sponsored the One Big Beautiful Bill Act during the 119th Congress, which he introduced May 20, 2025, and was signed into law July 4, 2025.

On November 11, 2025, Arrington announced that he would not seek re-election in 2026.

== Early life and education ==
Arrington, the son of Gene and Betty Arrington, was reared in Plainview. His father played basketball at Texas Tech, having lettered in 1958, 1959, and 1960 under coach Polk Robison. In high school, Arrington was a multi-sport athlete and a state-ranked tennis player.

After graduating from Plainview High School, Arrington attended Texas Tech, where he was a member of the Phi Delta Theta men's fraternity. He also "walked on to" the football team under Spike Dykes. He graduated in 1994 with a Bachelor of Arts in political science but remained at Texas Tech to pursue a Master of Public Administration degree, which he completed in 1997. In 2004, he earned a Certificate of International Business Management from the McDonough School of Business at Georgetown University.

== White House ==
After Bush was elected president in 2000, Arrington joined the White House as Special Assistant to the President and Associate Director of Presidential Personnel, where he served under Clay Johnson III. For the next year, Arrington briefed and made recommendations to the President, Vice President Dick Cheney, and Chief of Staff Andy Card. During his time in the Office of Presidential Personnel, he managed an executive search team that helped the office fill more than 5,000 executive-level, board, and commission positions. He specialized in energy, the environment, and natural resources appointments.

== Federal Deposit Insurance Corporation ==
In late December 2001, at age 28, Arrington became one of the youngest chiefs of staff in the history of the FDIC, where he served under the 18th chair, Donald E. Powell. As Powell's chief of staff, he managed and oversaw the offices of the Chairman, Policy Development, and Public Affairs, all of which he reorganized to increase efficiency. In 2002, Arrington began chairing the FDIC Board Appeals Committee and served in Powell's place on the Audit Committee.

== Gulf Coast rebuilding ==
In 2005, in the wake of FEMA's response to Hurricane Katrina, President Bush established by executive order the Office of the Federal Coordinator for Gulf Coast Rebuilding. Bush appointed Don Powell as Federal Coordinator, who, in turn, appointed Arrington as Deputy Federal Coordinator and Chief Operating Officer. In this role, Arrington worked with the governors of the affected states, as well as military officials, local authorities and charitable organizations. Powell and Arrington were responsible for developing and executing the federal government's recovery efforts, as well as coordinating with local, state and federal officials. By the end of Arrington's first year in the Gulf Coast, he had aided Powell in the procurement and implementation of much of the $120 billion spent on infrastructure and assistance relief.

== Texas Tech ==
After a year in the Gulf Coast position, Arrington returned to Texas Tech to serve as its system chief of staff. The Tech System includes Texas Tech University, Texas Tech Health Sciences Center, Midwestern State University (which did not join the Tech System until after Arrington's tenure there), and Angelo State University. He also served as the primary liaison to the vice-chancellors throughout the system.

In 2011, Arrington was named Vice Chancellor for Research and Commercialization at Texas Tech University System. During his seven-year tenure with the Texas Tech University System, Arrington chaired the Task Force for Enrollment Growth and was the chief architect of "Leading the Way", the strategic plan for the universities within the TTU System.

Arrington worked to secure the naming rights to the Laura W. Bush Institute for Women's Health for the university health sciences center. Since securing the naming rights in 2007, the institute has been responsible for raising hundreds of thousands of dollars for women's health care issues.

== Scott Laboratories ==
In 2014, Arrington became president of Scott Laboratories in Lubbock. As president of a healthcare innovation holding company, which includes a comprehensive health system, Arrington's primary role was to launch and grow new ventures and support new revenue opportunities at the health system.

Until his election to Congress, Arrington focused on developing a telehealth startup, launching an innovative insurance product, and establishing a digital marketing platform for the health system.

== U.S House of Representatives ==
=== Elections ===
Arrington ran unsuccessfully in 2014 in a special election for the Texas State Senate District 28. He lost to fellow Republican Charles Perry, who still holds the seat.

With Representative Randy Neugebauer of Texas's 19th congressional district retiring in 2016, Arrington ran for his seat. Former Lubbock mayor Glen Robertson led a nine-candidate field in the March 1 primary election with 27,791 votes (26.7%), followed by Arrington's 26,980 (26%). In third place was Michael Bob Starr, the former commander of Dyess Air Force Base, who led handily in Abilene and received 22,256 votes (21.4%). Laredo surgeon Donald R. May finished fourth with 9,592 votes (9.2%).

In the May 24 runoff election, Arrington defeated Robertson, 25,214 votes (53.7%) to 21,769 (46.3%).

In the November 8 general election, Arrington polled 176,314 votes (86.7%); Libertarian Troy Bonar trailed with 17,376 (8.5%), and the Green candidate, Mark Lawson, polled 9,785 (4.8%). No Democrat had filed to run in the heavily Republican district.

=== Political positions ===
==== National security ====
Arrington supported President Donald Trump's 2017 executive order curtailing immigration from seven Muslim-majority countries, saying: "It is important that our commander in chief puts the safety of Americans first. Given concerns about the inadequate vetting of refugees and problems with our immigration system, this temporary pause is intended to ensure the safety of our citizens."

==== Unemployment benefits ====
In defending a proposal to cut access to the SNAP program (food stamps), Arrington cited the biblical passage Thessalonians 3:10, saying: "He says even when we were with you we give you this rule, 'If a man will not work he shall not eat.' And he goes on to say, 'We heard that some of you are idle.' I think that every American, Republican or Democrat wants to help the needy among us. And I think it's a reasonable expectation that we have work requirements. I think that gives more credibility, frankly, to SNAP."

==== Texas v. Pennsylvania ====
In December 2020, Arrington was one of 126 Republican members of the House of Representatives to sign an amicus brief in support of Texas v. Pennsylvania, a lawsuit filed at the United States Supreme Court contesting the results of the 2020 presidential election, in which Joe Biden defeated Trump. The Supreme Court declined to hear the case on the basis that Texas lacked standing under Article III of the Constitution to challenge the results of an election held by another state.

==== Immigration ====
Arrington voted against the Further Consolidated Appropriations Act of 2020, which authorizes DHS to nearly double the available H-2B visas for the remainder of FY 2020.

Arrington voted against the Consolidated Appropriations Act (H.R. 1158), which effectively prohibits Immigration and Customs Enforcement from cooperating with the Department of Health and Human Services to detain or remove illegal alien sponsors of Unaccompanied Alien Children.

==== Israel ====
Arrington voted to provide Israel with support following 2023 Hamas attack on Israel.

==== 2020 election certification ====
Arrington opposed certifying the electoral vote count in the 2020 presidential election, citing "millions of American voters" who felt that the election "was not conducted in an equitable or accurate manner." He later condemned the attack on the United States Capitol that occurred on January 6, 2021. In the weeks that followed, Arrington voted against the second impeachment of President Trump.

==== Big Tech ====
In 2022, Arrington was one of 39 Republicans to vote for the Merger Filing Fee Modernization Act of 2022, an antitrust package that would crack down on corporations for anti-competitive behavior.

==== Marijuana ====
As of July, 2025, Arrington has received an "F" rating from the National Organization for the Reform of Marijuana Laws (NORML) based on public statements and voting records.

==== High National debt of the U.S. ====
On 7 May 2025, Arrington as House Budget Committee Chairman delivered opening remarks at the hearing The Fiscal State of the Nation. He said: "The fiscal state of the nation is in a dire state and condition and is rapidly in decline. I think the question is, ‘how much longer do we have to allow this unsustainable fiscal trajectory to persist without some intervention?’" "Both parties [...] — as I’m fond of saying actually over the years as Budget chairman — both parties have contributed to this. [...] what we’re lacking in Washington all around—maybe among others like common sense and common decency—is courage. Courage to do what is necessary. Courage to do what every generation of American leaders have done when facing such an epic crisis that could in fact leave America irreparably damaged."

=== Committee assignment ===
- United States House Committee on the Budget (Chairman)
- Committee on Ways and Means

=== Caucus membership ===
- Republican Study Committee
- Congressional Western Caucus

=== Awards and honors ===
Arrington received the 2003 Distinguished Public Service Award as part of the 22nd annual Center for Public Service Symposium in Lubbock.

U.S. House of Representatives
| Preceded by Randy Neugebauer | Member of the U.S. House of Representatives from Texas's 19th congressional district 2017–present | Incumbent |
| Preceded by John Yarmuth | Chair of the House Budget Committee; 2023–present | Incumbent |
U.S. order of precedence (ceremonial)
| Preceded by David Valadao | United States representatives by seniority 155th | Succeeded by Don Bacon |
