= Donald Bruce =

Donald Bruce may refer to:

- Donald Bruce, Baron Bruce of Donington (1912–2005), British politician
- Donald C. Bruce (1921–1969), American politician
