= Martin J. Gruenberg =

American attorney (born 1953)

Martin James Gruenberg
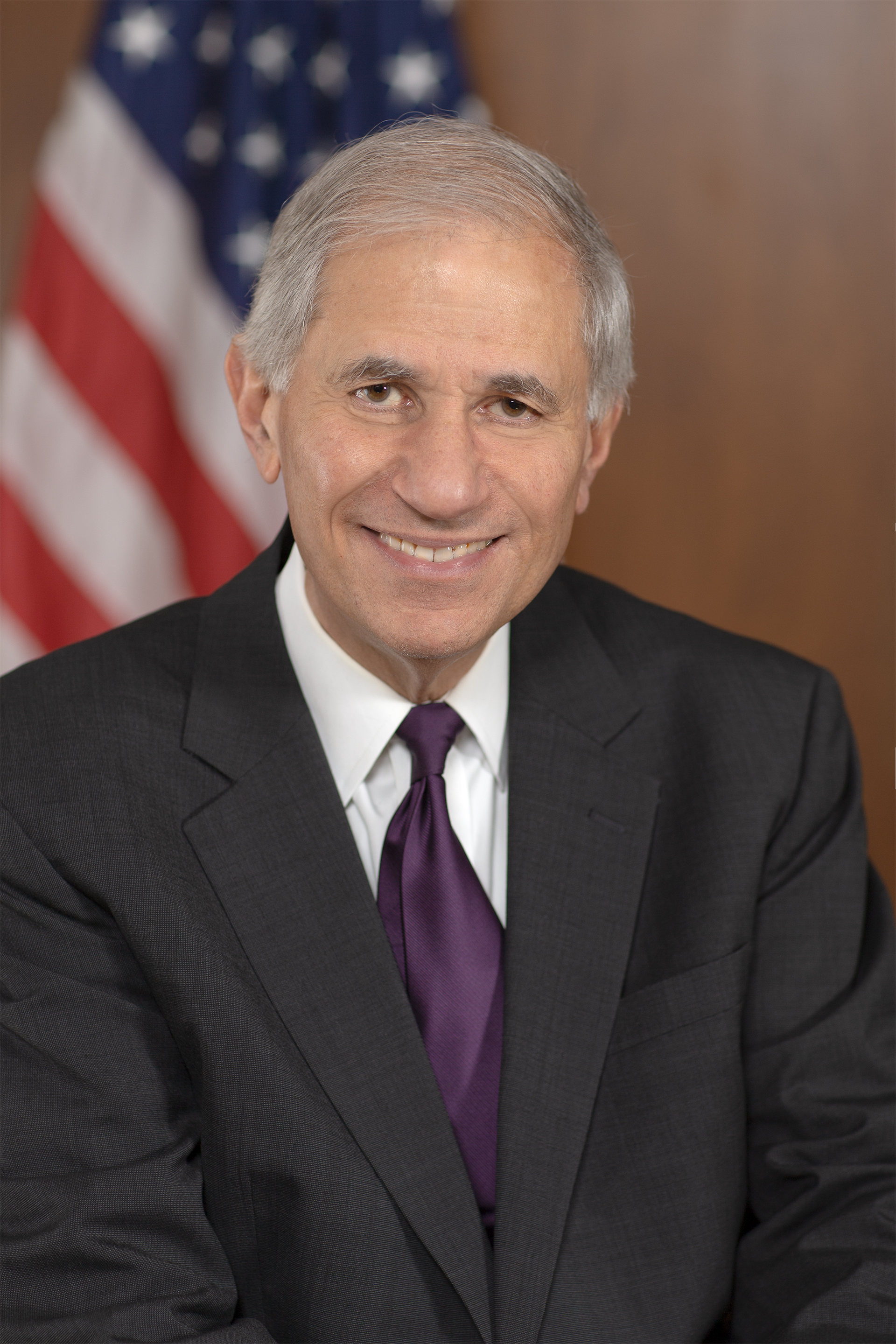
- Official portrait, 2022

Chairman of the Federal Deposit Insurance Corporation
- In office January 5, 2023 – January 19, 2025; Acting: February 5, 2022 – January 5, 2023
- President: Joe Biden
- Preceded by: Jelena McWilliams
- Succeeded by: Travis Hill
- In office November 28, 2012 – June 5, 2018; Acting: July 9, 2011 – November 28, 2012
- President: Barack Obama; Donald Trump
- Deputy: Thomas M. Hoenig
- Preceded by: Sheila Bair
- Succeeded by: Jelena McWilliams
- Acting; November 16, 2005 – June 26, 2006
- President: George W. Bush
- Preceded by: Donald E. Powell
- Succeeded by: Sheila Bair

Member of the Board of Directors of the Federal Deposit Insurance Corporation
- In office August 22, 2005 – January 19, 2025
- President: George W. Bush; Barack Obama; Donald Trump; Joe Biden
- Preceded by: John M. Reich
- Succeeded by: vacant

Personal details
- Born: April 1, 1953 (age 73)
- Party: Democratic
- Education: Princeton University (AB); Case Western Reserve University (JD)

Martin James Gruenberg (born April 1, 1953) is an American attorney who served as chairman of the Federal Deposit Insurance Corporation (FDIC) from 2023 to 2025; 2012 to 2018; as well as on an acting basis from 2005 to 2006 and 2011 to 2012.

== Education ==
Gruenberg received an A.B. from Princeton University's Woodrow Wilson School of Public and International Affairs. He received a J.D. from Case Western Reserve University School of Law in 1979.

== Career ==
Before joining the FDIC Board, Gruenberg served as senior counsel to Senator Paul S. Sarbanes (D-MD) on the staff of the Senate Committee on Banking, Housing, and Urban Affairs (Senate Banking Committee) from 1993 to 2005. He also served as Staff Director of the Banking Committee's Subcommittee on International Finance and Monetary Policy from 1987 to 1992.

Gruenberg served as chairman of the executive council and president of the International Association of Deposit Insurers from November 2007 to November 2012.

=== Federal Deposit Insurance Corporation (FDIC) ===
Gruenberg has served on the FDIC Board of Directors since August 22, 2005, with confirmations by the Senate on July 29, 2005 by voice vote, on March 29, 2012 by voice vote, and on December 19, 2022 by a vote of 45–39.

From the beginning of his tenure on the board until his first Senate confirmation as chairman in 2012, Gruenberg served as the Senate-confirmed vice chairman. He served as acting chairman under President George W. Bush from November 16, 2005 to June 26, 2006, until the confirmation of Sheila Bair.

Gruenberg also served as acting chairman under President Barack Obama from July 9, 2011 to November 28, 2012. In 2011, Obama nominated Gruenberg for a full five-year term as chairman, and was confirmed by the Senate on November 15, 2012. He served as chairman of the FDIC from November 28, 2012 to June 5, 2018. During this period, Operation Choke Point took place. The FDIC and Department of Justice settled multiple lawsuits related to Operation Choke Point for the pressuring of banks to shut down the accounts of legal industries accessing banking services.

In December 2019, he became the longest-serving director in FDIC history, surpassing Preston Delano, who served in his capacity as Comptroller of the Currency from 1938 to 1953.

Under President Joe Biden, Gruenberg served as acting chairman for a third time beginning on February 5, 2022. Biden nominated Gruenberg for a second full term in November 2022, and the nomination was confirmed by the Senate on December 19, 2022. Gruenberg was sworn in for his second Senate-confirmed term as chairman on January 5, 2023.

The Wall Street Journal published an article in November 2023 detailing widespread sexual harassment, racial discrimination, and other misconduct issues at the FDIC. Following this article, the FDIC and Chair Gruenberg created an action plan to address the situation. The agency retained the law firm of Cleary Gottlieb Steen & Hamilton LLP (Cleary Gottlieb) to conduct an independent investigation into its workplace culture. The final Cleary Gottlieb report was released in May 2024. It found 485 allegations of sexual harassment, sexual assault, racial discrimination, and other forms of misconduct. The report noted that employees described the FDIC's workplace culture as “misogynistic,” “patriarchal,” “insular,” and “outdated”.

The report includes a section that specifically addresses Chair Gruenberg's temperament and behavior. It notes that there was a 2008 investigation into then Vice Chair Gruenberg's conduct after he "berated a female employee". While the Cleary Gottlieb report noted that some FDIC employees described Chair Gruenberg as a calm and professional leader, it states that many others described him as “aggressive,” “harsh,” “emotional,” “upset,” “unhappy,” “agitated,” “vitriol[ic],” “prosecutorial,” “disrespectful,” “intense,” "bombastic," "verbally abusive," "out of control," having “raising his voice,” or having a “short fuse”. The report notes that when he has received bad news, employees say that Chair Gruenberg had thrown reports that he has been presented with, yelled and cursed at employees, and threatened to fire staff.

On May 15-16, 2024, Chair Gruenberg, along with two other financial regulators, appeared in hearings before the House of Representatives Committee on Financial Services and Senate Committee on Banking, Housing, and Urban Affairs. In these hearings, the Chairman was criticized by both Republicans and Democrats for his personal conduct and his failure to see larger workplace culture issues sooner at the FDIC. Chair Gruenberg said he read and accepted the Cleary Gottlieb report. On the matter of his personal conduct, he maintains that while he may have been harsh with staff, he has always endeavored to treat all FDIC employees with courtesy and respect. The Cleary Gottlieb report noted that Chair Gruenberg felt there was a disconnect between his actions and others' perceptions of his actions. After being questioned on the matter by Representatives Patrick McHenry and Sylvia Garcia, the Chairman agreed to pursue an anger management course and seek counseling. While many Congressmen have called for him to resign or for President Biden to remove him from office, Chair Gruenberg has asserted that he is committed to leading and transforming the FDIC. However, on May 20, 2024, Martin Gruenberg announced he would be prepared to step down once a successor is confirmed. On November 19, 2024, Gruenberg announced he will retire from the FDIC on January 19, 2025, a day ahead of Donald Trump's inauguration as the 47th President of the United States.

Political offices
Preceded by Donald Powell	Chair of the Federal Deposit Insurance Corporation; Acting; 2005–2006	Succeeded by Sheila Bair
Preceded by Sheila Bair	Chair of the Federal Deposit Insurance Corporation; Acting: 2011–2012; 2011–2018	Succeeded by Jelena McWilliams
Preceded by Jelena McWilliams	Chair of the Federal Deposit Insurance Corporation; Acting: 2022; 2022–present	Incumbent
