= Erle Cocke =

Erle Cocke may refer to:

- Erle Cocke Jr. (1921–2000), American businessman and U.S. Army officer
- Erle Cocke Sr. (1895–1977), his father, American banker and public servant
