= Marshall R. Diggs =

Marshall R. Diggs Sr
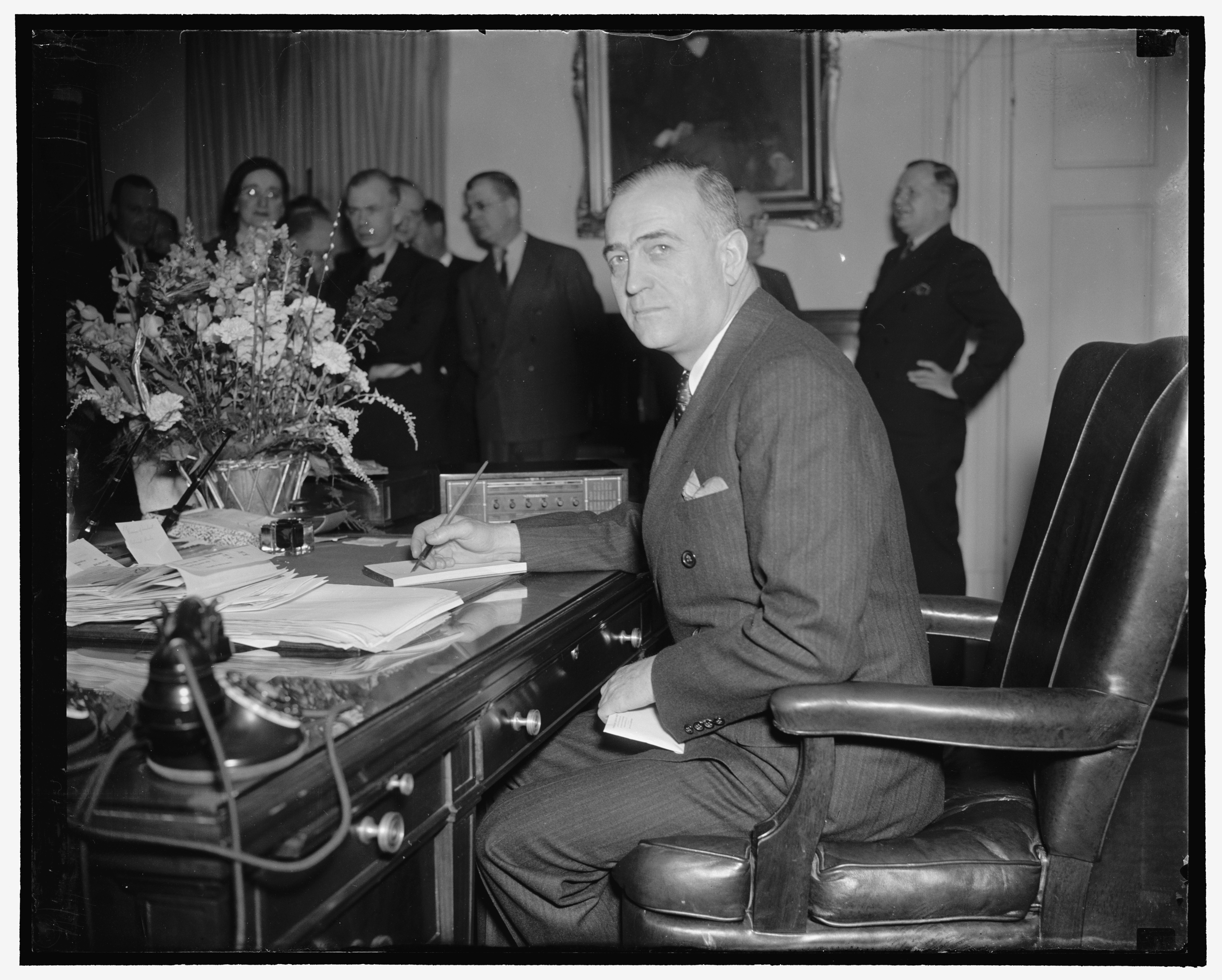

Comptroller of the Currency, acting
- In office April 1938 – September 1938
- Preceded by: J. F. T. O'Connor
- Succeeded by: Preston Delano

Personal details
- Born: Marshall R. Diggs; November 7, 1888 Dallas, Texas
- Died: September 1968 Washington, D.C.
- Children: Marshall R. Diggs Jr
- Education: Yale University
- Occupation: lawyer, businessman, public servant

Marshall R. Diggs Sr (November 7, 1888 – September, 1968) was a United States Acting Comptroller of the Currency from April, 1938 to September, 1938.

Born in the City of Dallas, Texas on November 7, 1888, Marshall R. Diggs received his J.D. from the School of Law at Yale University in June, 1913. He then entered the practice of law in the private sector. During this time, born to Marshall R. Diggs Sr. and his wife is Marshall R. Diggs Jr. (January 26, 1926 to June 18, 2015) who would follow his father and obtain his B.A. from Yale University and then his LLB from the School of Law, University of Texas then followed by admission to the bar in the State of Texas.

In January 1934, Marshall R. Diggs Sr. set aside law in the private sector and was in Washington, D.C. having obtained an appointment as executive assistant to the then Comptroller of the Currency, J. F. T. O'Connor in the Franklin D. Roosevelt Administration.

On January 15 of 1938, Marshall R. Diggs was sworn into Office as the 21st Deputy Comptroller of the Currency along with Goodwin J. Oppegard who would serve as the concurrent 22nd Deputy Comptroller of the Currency. However, in April, 1938, the then Comptroller of the Currency, J.F.T. O'Connor, resigned from Office in order to campaign unsuccessfully for the Office of Governor of California and Diggs quickly finds himself holding the Office of Acting Comptroller of the Currency. According to the mentions of his name in the articles of the New York Times from April 1938 to September 1938, Diggs appears to have been quite busy during the short time in which he held the acting comptroller office. However, on September 30, 1938, Marshall R. Diggs and Goodwin J. Oppegard both resigned their offices thereby becoming the shortest ever office holders of the title Deputy Comptroller of the Currency to date since the creation of the Office on May 9, 1863. The very next day, Preston Delano was the new Comptroller of the Currency.

In October 1938, Marshall R. Diggs Sr. was then moved over to the Federal Deposit Insurance Corporation or FDIC which had been created by legislation on June 16, 1933.

While living in D.C., Marshall R. Diggs Sr. got involved in local extra-curricular activities. In 1947–1948, Diggs served as the president of the Yale Club of Washington. Back in 1905, U.S. President William Howard Taft had held this honorary office.

After leaving the public sector, Marshall R. Diggs Sr. returned to the private sector but remained in D.C. even setting up an office at 1025 Connecticut Avenue N.W. with some associates. In May 1959, Diggs Sr. meets Mario Garcia Kohly (July 16, 1901 in Cuba to August 1975 in Virginia), who only three months earlier had escaped from a Fidel Castro prison in Cuba, and Diggs Sr agrees to help Kohly carry out his plans to remove Fidel Castro from Office.

While in the private sector, Marshall R. Diggs Sr. will become president of MacInar Inc. whose filing date was September 3 of 1958 within the District of Columbia. Then on August 6, 1964, the New York Times carries the following headline: 'Ten Are Indicted In Sale Of Stock'; named among the 10 facing a 76-count indictment is the president of MacInar Inc, Marshall R. Diggs.

Within four years of this indictment, Marshall R. Diggs would be dead; he died in September 1968 while still living in Washington, D.C.

In addition, MacInar Inc.'s filing status is now listed as revoked.
