= Finswimming at the 2001 World Games – Men's 4 x 100 m surface =

International sporting event in Akita, Japan

Finswimming - men's 4 x 100 m surface relay at the World Games
- Venue: Akita Prefectural Pool
- Date: 25 August 2001
- Competitors: 28 from 7 nations

Medalists
1st place, gold medalist(s)		Ilya Somov; Evgeny Skorzhenko; Maksim Maksimov; Sergey Akhapov
2nd place, silver medalist(s)		Zhao Ji; Hu Hailong; Huang Jiandong; Li Yong
3rd place, bronze medalist(s)		Frank Wille; Sven Kaiser; Sven Gallasch; Andreas Utzmeir

The men's 4 x 100 m surface relay event in finswimming at the 2001 World Games took place on 25 August 2001 at the Akita Prefectural Pool in Akita, Japan.

== Competition format ==
A total of 7 teams entered the competition. Only final was held.

== Results ==
Rank	Country	Team	Time	Note
1st place, gold medalist(s)	Russia	Ilya Somov; Evgeny Skorzhenko; Maksim Maksimov; Sergey Akhapov	2:29.88	GR
2nd place, silver medalist(s)	China	Zhao Ji; Hu Hailong; Huang Jiandong; Li Yong	2:35.18	
3rd place, bronze medalist(s)	Germany	Frank Wille; Sven Kaiser; Sven Gallasch; Andreas Utzmeir	2:36.11	
4	Czech Republic	Lukáš Rada; Jan Kamprle; Jan Skružný; Kamil Maršálek	2:42.38	
5	France	Loic Abouzit; Slimann Dekhar; Richard Jean Francois; Erven Morice	2:45.18	
6	Japan	Makoto Oyama; Yoshiyuki Abe; Chiaki Komine; Tadasu Horiuchi	2:50.05	
	Spain	Javier del Morral; Juan José Iturralde; Fernando Gonzalez Illan; Jose Miguel Iniesta	DSQ	
