= Doug O'Dell =

Retired Major general of the United States Marine Corps

Major General Doug O'Dell
- Military career
- Branch: United States Marine Corps
- Commands: 4th Marine Division

Doug O'Dell is a retired Major general in the United States Marine Corps, notable for being appointed as the head of the Office of the Federal Coordinator for Gulf Coast Rebuilding by President Bush.

== Early life ==
He grew up in Pottstown, Pennsylvania and attended The Hill School and Rutgers University. Upon graduation from Rutgers in 1968, he was commissioned through the Platoon Leaders Class.

During his career in the United States Marine Corps Reserves, he pursued a civilian career in investment management, and retired in 2001
