= Mark Patterson =

Mark Patterson may refer to:

- Mark Patterson (Australian cricketer) (born 1966), Australian cricketer
- Mark Patterson (Irish cricketer) (born 1974), former Irish cricketer
- Mark Patterson (field hockey) (born 1969), Indian Olympic hockey player
- Mark Patterson (footballer, born 1965), former Bolton Wanderers, Blackburn Rovers, Preston North End and Bury player, later manager of Scarborough
- Mark Patterson (footballer, born 1968), former Plymouth Argyle and Gillingham player
- Mark Patterson (investor), private equity and hedge fund investor who co-founded MatlinPatterson Global Advisors, and a racing driver
- Mark Patterson (Idaho politician), American politician in the Idaho House of Representatives
- Mark Patterson (New Zealand politician), member of the New Zealand House of Representatives
- Mark A. Patterson, American lobbyist and Chief of Staff to the Secretary of the Treasury (2009–)

== See also ==
- Mark Paterson (disambiguation)
- Mark Pattison (disambiguation)
