= Travis Hill (attorney) =

American attorney (born 1983)

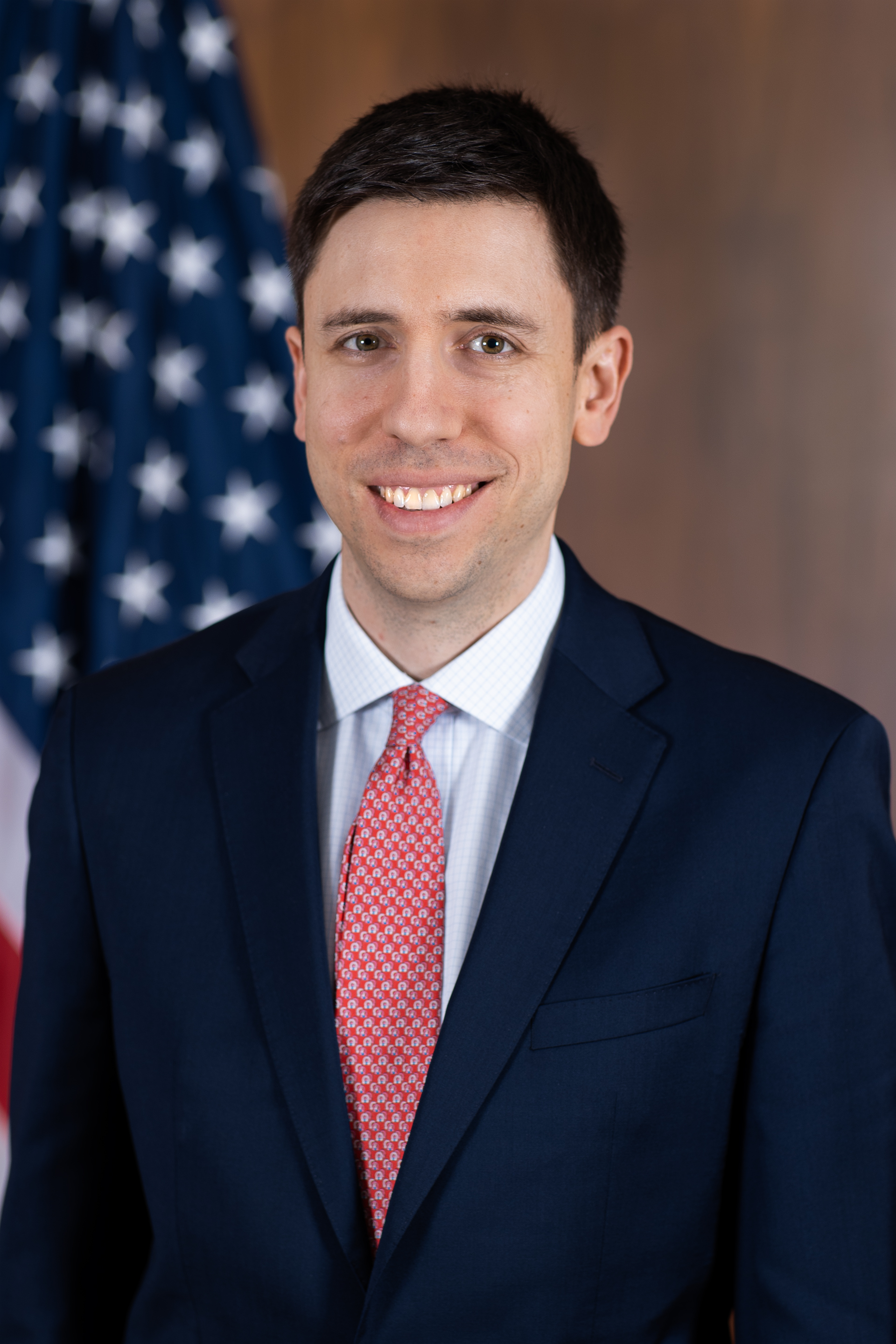

Chairman of the Federal Deposit Insurance Corporation
- Incumbent
- Assumed office January 20, 2025; Acting: January 20, 2025 – January 2, 2026
- President: Donald Trump
- Preceded by: Martin J. Gruenberg

Personal details
- Born: 1983 (age 42–43) New York, New York, U.S.
- Education: Duke University (BS); Georgetown University Law Center (JD)

Travis Hill (born 1983) is an American attorney and banking regulator currently serving as chairman of the Federal Deposit Insurance Corporation (FDIC). He became acting chairman on January 20, 2025, was formally nominated to serve as chairman on September 30, 2025, and began a five-year term as chairman on January 2, 2026. He previously served as vice chairman of the FDIC from 2023 to 2025.

== Early life and education ==
Hill received a Bachelor of Science from Duke University, where he studied economics and political science, and a Juris Doctor from Georgetown University Law Center.

== Career ==
Prior to joining the FDIC, Hill served as senior counsel at the United States Senate Committee on Banking, Housing, and Urban Affairs, where he worked from 2013 to 2018. In this role, as a staffer to Committee Chairman Mike Crapo (R-ID), Hill was a primary author of the Economic Growth, Regulatory Relief, and Consumer Protection Act (S. 2155), which passed the Senate with bipartisan support in March 2018 and was signed into law in May 2018. Hill also participated extensively in the drafting and negotiating of various other legislative efforts. Before working at the Senate, Hill worked as a policy analyst at Regions Financial Corporation.

=== Federal Deposit Insurance Corporation (FDIC) ===
Before joining the FDIC Board of Directors, Hill served as deputy to the chairman for policy and senior advisor to the chairman under FDIC chairman Jelena McWilliams. In these roles, Hill served as chairman McWilliams's primary policy deputy and oversaw a range of policy initiatives, including the FDIC's implementation of S. 2155 and response to the COVID-19 pandemic.

Hill was nominated to serve as vice chairman of the FDIC on September 22, 2022, and was confirmed by the Senate on December 19, 2022, by voice vote. Hill was vice chairman when Silicon Valley Bank, Signature Bank, and First Republic Bank failed in the spring of 2023. In April 2023, Hill was critical of the FDIC's resolution of Silicon Valley Bank, criticizing the agency's lack of urgency in finding an acquirer for the failed institution.

Hill became acting chairman of the FDIC on January 20, 2025, was formally nominated by President Donald Trump to serve as chairman on September 30, 2025, and was confirmed by the Senate on December 18, 2025, by a vote of 53–43. As chairman, Hill has pursued reforms to the FDIC's supervisory practices, emphasizing material financial risks relevant to banks' solvency over process-based examinations. He has also advanced substantial revisions to the agency's approach to resolving failed banks and overseeing emerging financial technologies.

== Personal life ==
Hill lives in Maryland with his wife and three children.
