= James Saxon =

James Saxon may refer to:

- James Saxon (actor) (1954–2003), British actor
- James Saxon (painter) (1772–1819 or later), British portrait painter
- James Saxon (American football) (born 1966), American National Football League coach and former running back
- James J. Saxon (1914–1980), 21st Comptroller of the Currency for the United States Department of the Treasury
