= Leo Crowley =

American politician (1889 to 1972)

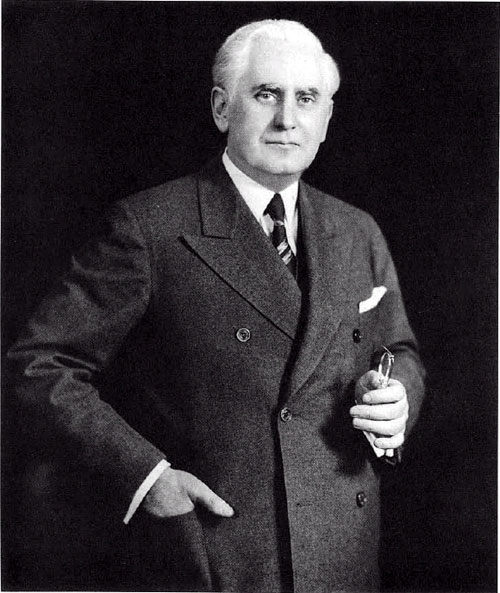

Head of the Foreign Economic Administration
- In office September, 1943–December 31, 1945
- Preceded by: Edward Stettinius Jr. (As Administrator of the Office of Lend-Lease Administration)
- Succeeded by: Office abolished*

Chairman of the Federal Deposit Insurance Corporation
- In office February 1, 1934 - October 15, 1945
- Preceded by: Walter J. Cummings
- Succeeded by: Preston Delano

Personal details
- Born: August 15, 1889 Milton, Wisconsin
- Died: April 15, 1972 (aged 82) Madison, Wisconsin
- Education: University of Wisconsin

Leo Thomas Crowley (August 15, 1889 – April 15, 1972) was a senior administrator for President Franklin D. Roosevelt as the head of the Foreign Economic Administration. Previous to that he had served as chief of the Federal Deposit Insurance Corporation (FDIC) and as Alien Property Custodian. Crowley was a significant administrator, troubleshooter, and political operative for Roosevelt from 1934 to 1945.

In 1943, Time magazine dubbed Crowley the "Nation's #1 Pinch Hitter," and one commentator called him FDR's "manager par excellence". Historians later discovered that late in the 1930s, senior Washington officials learned that Crowley had embezzled from his banks in Wisconsin in the 1920s and 1930s. This information was suppressed because of Crowley's political and administrative usefulness. Biographer Stuart Weiss wrote that Crowley's story is:

the darker story of the businessman as speculator and embezzler, whose fraud was covered up in Wisconsin and Washington....[in part it is] the morally complex and compelling story of Crowley as a bureaucrat and politician in Washington, administering multiple major agencies, often simultaneously;...but also deeply involved in conflicts of interest a later generation would find unacceptable and even incomprehensible.

== Early life ==
Leo Crowley was born to Thomas and Katie Crowley in Milton, Wisconsin, immigrants of Irish Catholic origin. He went to the University of Wisconsin. His father worked for the Milwaukee Road. Young Leo delivered groceries and saved his tips from customers. In 1905, with $1000 he bought a part of the General Paper Company, some of the products of which he had been bringing to customers. He worked hard to grow the company, and his share in it, until he owned it outright in 1919. That year he took over the T. S. Morris company with financing from Milo Hagen and W.D. Curtis. Selling stock in this company relieved its debt, and he bought a wholesale grocery for his brothers to run, and land in Madison, Wisconsin.

== Political life ==
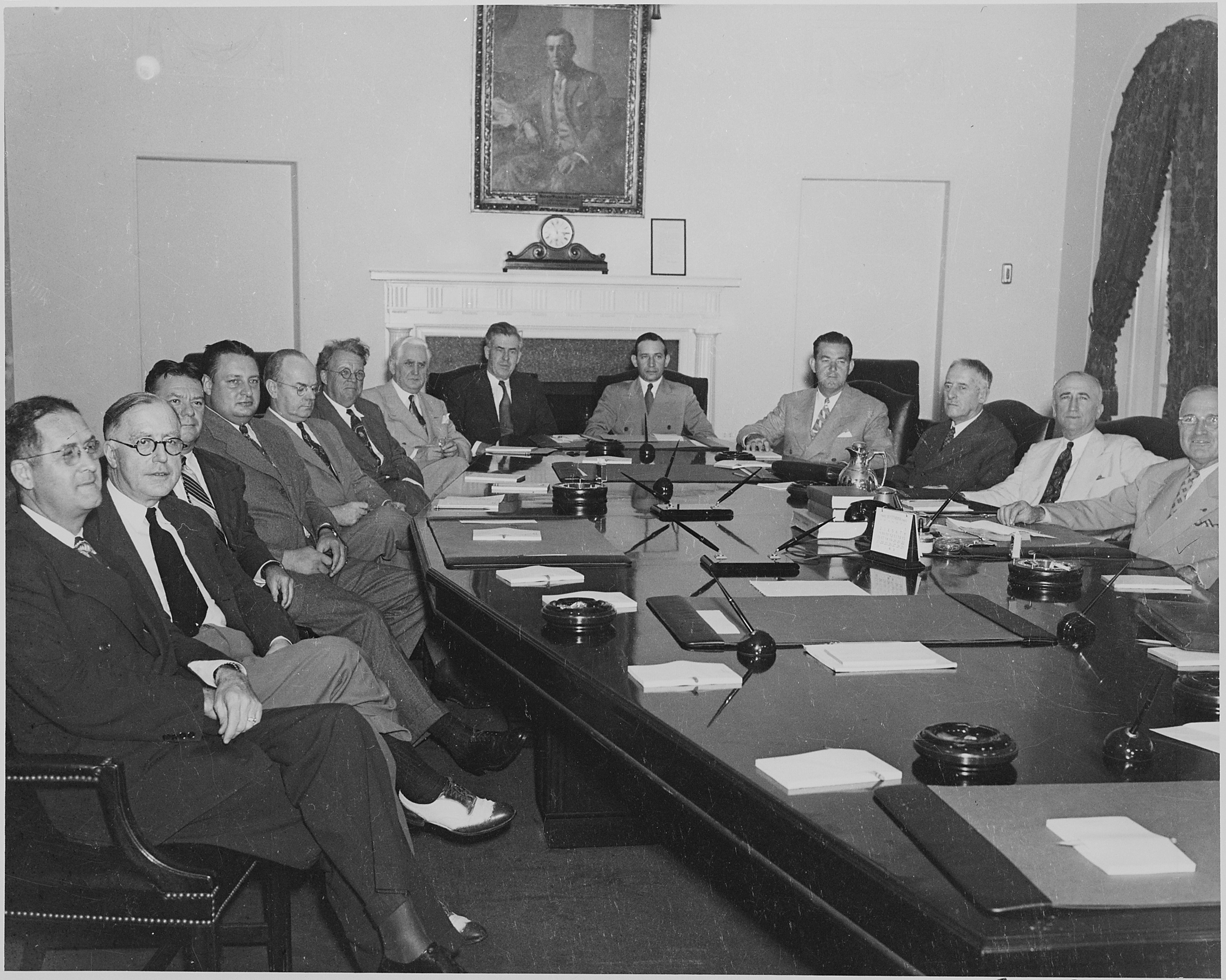
Crowley (center, 7th from left or right) in a meeting of Truman's cabinet (August 1945)

Crowley began his entry into the political arena by supporting Albert G. Schmedeman for governor of Wisconsin. The biographer Weiss says "He managed Schmedeman as a parent might his children, and as he managed his family and most of the nurses at Saint Mary's Hospital."

Crowley served as a delegate for Al Smith at the Democratic National Convention. He thus came in contact with Jouett Shouse and John J. Raskob, operatives for Al Smith. Progressivism was strong in Wisconsin, as expressed by Senator John J. Blaine and the newspaper Capital Times edited by William T. Evjue. Crowley was effective in bringing about a progressive-democratic alliance for the election of Franklin Roosevelt.

From the mid-1930s, Leo T. Crowley was more than just the head of a powerful agency the FDIC. He also negotiated with Congressional leaders on banking issues and played a central role in designing new federal banking laws. He promoted Roosevelt's political interests in Wisconsin by working with the state's left-wing Progressive Party for the 1936 and 1940 elections. At the same time Crowley also served as a crucial link between Roosevelt, and right-wing forces in Congress and the national bank community. In 1940, he was considered --but not chosen--for the chairmanship of the Democratic National Committee.

It was the Glass–Steagall Act that created the Federal Deposit Insurance Corporation (FDIC), one of the most popular elements of the New Deal because it protecting the bank accounts of local depositors. Biographer Weiss tells the tale of how the nearly-bankrupt Crowley became the leader in banking security and thus ended the epidemic of bank runs that had closed thousands of small banks.

Crowley's special capacity for smoothing troubled waters drew him closer to FDR. A wartime cabinet-level conflict involving foreign economic operations in Europe and North Africa threatened cabinet solidarity. So Crowley became head of the Foreign Economic Administration in September 1943, with responsibility for Lend-Lease and Edward R. Stettinius Jr., was promoted to Undersecretary of State. Crowley was now a cabinet member in the Roosevelt administration.

=== Crowley as embezzler ===
The skeleton in Crowley's closet was his misappropriation of funds in 1931. Working under the direction of Secretary of the Treasury Henry Morgenthau Jr., the Comptroller of the Currency J. E. T. O'Connor, investigated Crowley's banking record in Wisconsin. O'Connor found multiple cases of illegal financial enrichment by Crowley totalling tens of thousands of dollars. Roosevelt liked Crowley and could not risk a humiliating scandal that could seriously damage the New Deal. Crowley had unusually close relations with the President and top presidential adviser James F. Byrnes. They blocked Morgenthau from firing Crowley, but he was moved to another agency and Morgenthau kept silent. Crowley also made adroit moves that gave him a political base and preserved him in office. For example, He had received the Order of Saint Gregory the Great from Pope Pius XI in 1929. Furthermore he made friends with both Democrats and Republicans in Washington, and did favors for Congressmen. Everyone liked him and no one suspected his past history. Roosevelt liked Crowley's administrative competence and loyalty to FDR, so he moved him to the powerful position of alien property custodian, where he did not have opportunities for embezzlement and did not report to Morgenthau. Furthermore, he also could keep a salary from an outside business Biographer Weiss concludes that, "Crowley had won a striking personal victory."

== Later life ==
Back in the business world, Crowley was named chairman of the Milwaukee Road in December 1945 and made it turn a profit until the mid-1960s. He continued contact with the White House: President Dwight Eisenhower appointed Crowley to the United States Commission on Civil Rights in his second term, and he was known to have dined with Lyndon Johnson.

Leo Crowley died on April 15, 1972, in a hospital in Madison, Wisconsin.

Very negatively for Crowley in 1955, Harry Truman wrote about how Crowley had caused a problem with the Soviets when Germany was defeated. The episode was recounted by daughter Margaret Truman in 1973. She adds:

...the real lesson was one that he hesitated to state in his memoirs – the extreme hostility which certain men in government, such as Mr. Crowley, felt toward Russia. It did not make my father's task any easier, to find the middle path between these men and the Henry Wallace types, who could not believe the Russians were capable of any wrongdoing.
