= James J. Saxon =

Comptroller of the United States (1914–1980)

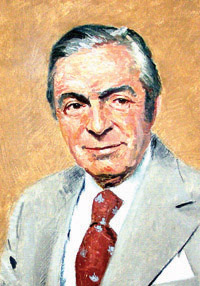

21st Comptroller of the Currency
- In office November 16, 1961 – November 15, 1966
- President: John F. Kennedy; Lyndon B. Johnson
- Preceded by: Ray M. Gidney
- Succeeded by: William B. Camp

Acting Chair of the Federal Deposit Insurance Corporation
- In office August 4, 1963 - January 22, 1964
- Preceded by: Erle Cocke, Sr.
- Succeeded by: Joseph W. Barr

Personal details
- Born: April 13, 1914 Toledo, Ohio
- Died: January 28, 1980 (aged 65) Washington, D.C.
- Occupation: Lawyer

James Joseph Saxon (April 13, 1914 – January 28, 1980) was the 21st Comptroller of the Currency for the United States Department of the Treasury. He was appointed by President John F. Kennedy in 1961.

Saxon left the Office of the Comptroller in January 1967. He subsequently practiced law in Washington and served as vice chairman of the board of the American Fletcher National Bank in Indianapolis.

== Biography ==
James Joseph Saxon was born on April 13, 1914, in Toledo, Ohio. He received a law degree from Georgetown University in 1950.

Saxon began his career as a securities statistician in the Office of the Comptroller of the Currency in 1937. He spent World War II as a roving problem solver for the Treasury Department, dealing with financial problems overseas.

After World War II, Saxon served as a special assistant in the office of Treasury Secretary John Snyder. In 1952, he went to work for the Democratic National Committee. After the 1952 elections, Saxon became the assistant general counsel of the American Bankers Association (ABA) in its Washington, D.C., office. Saxon left the ABA to work as an attorney for the First National Bank of Chicago.

In 1961, President John F. Kennedy nominated Saxon to be Comptroller of the Currency. Saxon's top priority was to expand the national banking industry and liberate national banks from regulation he deemed burdensome. Saxon permitted national banks to engage in businesses from which they had previously been barred, such as selling insurance and issuing credit cards.

In his first years as comptroller, Saxon changed the agency substantially by expanding its legal and economic staffs, undertaking a program to expand bank powers, and welcoming new banks and branches into the national banking system in contrast to the more restrictive practices of his immediate predecessors. Saxon created a system of regional comptrollers, each of whom exercised significant authority and autonomy. After his resignation, he returned to the practice of law. He had a wide experience with legal and banking.

Saxon had been at odds with the Federal Reserve Board for some time, encouraging broader investment and lending powers for banks that were not part of the Federal Reserve system. Saxon also had decided that non-Reserve banks could underwrite state and local general obligation bonds, again weakening the dominant Federal Reserve banks.

When Saxon took office in November 1961, he found that the methods of handling applications for new banks, branches, and mergers that had not been changed for decades. Almost every piece of paper pertaining to an application was considered secret, and virtually no public announcements of any kind emanated from the office. In the preceding ninety-eight-year history of the office, there had never been a public hearing or a written opinion published on an application. Anything that smacked of controversy was considered bad for the banking "image". "In fairness to all of Saxons distinguished predecessors in office", it was at the time, that: "these methods are the traditionally accepted ones for a bank supervisory agency. They obviously could not have survived as long as they did without the approval of industry affected, of the courts, and of Congress."

Saxon defended his controversial record of chartering 369 new national banks during 1963 and 1964, insisting that such expansion was essential to keep up with the expanding economy and to generate competition among lenders. Like many bankers, he blamed bank takeovers by unsavory characters on a loophole in federal law (since closed) that left Federal officials in the dark about changes in bank ownership. Mindful of congressional cries that gangsters might still be buying up banks to sanitize their hot money, Joseph W. Barr, chairman of the Federal Deposit Insurance Corporation, announced that he had set up a unit to help the Justice Department weed out criminals in banking.

Government offices
Preceded by Ray M. Gidney	Comptroller of the Currency; 1961–1966	Succeeded by William B. Camp
