= Farm Credit System Insurance Corporation =

The Farm Credit System Insurance Corporation (FCSIC) is an entity of the Farm Credit System (FCS), established by the Agricultural Credit Act of 1987, to insure the timely repayment of principal and interest on FCS debt securities.

== See also ==
- Title 12 of the Code of Federal Regulations
- Federal Crop Insurance Corporation
