= James E. Smith (politician, born 1930) =

American politician (1930–2020)

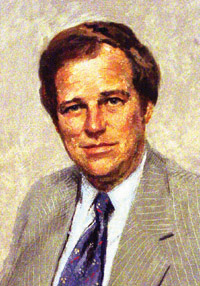

23rd Comptroller of the Currency
- In office July 5, 1973 – July 31, 1976
- President: Richard M. Nixon; Gerald R. Ford
- Preceded by: William B. Camp
- Succeeded by: John G. Heimann

Chair of the Federal Deposit Insurance Corporation
- In office March 16, 1976 - March 18, 1976
- Preceded by: Frank Wille
- Succeeded by: Robert E. Barnett

Personal details
- Born: September 29, 1930 Aberdeen, South Dakota
- Died: September 23, 2020 (aged 89) Bethesda, Maryland, U.S.
- Occupation: financial consultant

James Enlo Smith (September 29, 1930 – September 23, 2020) was Comptroller of the Currency of the United States from 1973 to 1976. Smith was born in Aberdeen, South Dakota.

James E. Smith was Deputy Under-Secretary of the Treasury before being named Comptroller by President Nixon. The explosive growth of banking in the 1960s and 1970s was changing the face of banking.

In response, Smith led a review of the agency's examination practices, which changed the way the agency did business: more emphasis was placed on assessment of a bank's own policies, procedures, decision making, and management information system, and the importance of training and career development for national bank examiners was recognized. After his resignation, Smith became a financial consultant. Smith died on September 23, 2020, at the age of 89.
