= Office of the Federal Coordinator for Gulf Coast Rebuilding =

United States governmental office

The Office of the Federal Coordinator for Gulf Coast Rebuilding was created by U.S. President George W. Bush in 2005 to devise a long-term plan for the rebuilding of the region devastated by Hurricanes Katrina and Rita. Its mission is based on a strategy focused on a set of prioritized, integrated and long-term initiatives to rebuild the region better than it was before.

Created by Executive Order by President Bush after an inadequate response to Hurricane Katrina by the Federal Emergency Management Agency (FEMA), the office was established by Federal Coordinator Donald E. Powell and Deputy Federal Coordinator Jodey Arrington. In their first year in the Gulf, Powell and Arrington helped secure and oversee over $120 billion in funding for infrastructure and assistance.

The aims the office sought to achieve were:

Restore long-term safety and security

- Rebuild the region’s water management system to world-class standards, and create a new governance structure (controlling quantity, such as levees and canals, as well as quality)
- Improve the planning of emergency services (such as emergency first response—911) and create new evacuation plans
- Restore and protect the environment, including the balanced development of new towns and wetlands restoration
- Reconstitute the justice system, restoring police departments, courts, district-attorney systems and prisons
- Rebuild the healthcare delivery system through a network of private and public hospitals and clinics

Renew the region’s economy and create growth opportunities

- Support business investment through tax relief and simplification, regulatory flexibility and other incentives
- Provide support for small business in the region with disaster loans and other relief
- Repair critical public infrastructure such as roads, bridges, water and sewer systems and public buildings
- Create new jobs and restore pre-disaster opportunities by providing incentives and job-training programs

Revitalize communities

- Rebuild and repair permanent homes by addressing long-term financing gaps and safer, more responsible building codes
- Support the states in developing urban plans and building urban communities for the current and future population of the region
- Improve and rebuild the education system in K-12 and post-secondary institutions
- Renew community and faith-based institutions to restore community networks and social-services delivery to the regional population
