= Title 12 of the Code of Federal Regulations =

United States law title

CFR Title 12 – Banks and Banking is one of 50 titles composing the United States Code of Federal Regulations (CFR) and contains the principal set of rules and regulations issued by federal agencies regarding banks and banking. It is available in digital and printed form and can be referenced online using the Electronic Code of Federal Regulations (e-CFR).

== Structure ==
The table of contents, as reflected in the e-CFR updated March 5, 2014, is as follows:

Volume	Chapter	Parts	Regulatory Entity
1	I	1-199	Controller of the Currency, Department of the Treasury
2	II	200-219	Federal Reserve System
3		220-229	Federal Reserve System
4		230-299	Federal Reserve System
5	III	300-399	Federal Deposit Insurance Corporation
	IV	400-499	Export-Import Bank of the United States
6	V	500-599	Office of Thrift Supervision, Department of the Treasury
7	VI	600-699	Farm Credit Administration
	VII	700-799	National Credit Union Administration
	VIII	800-899	Federal Financing Bank
8	IX	900-999	Federal Housing Finance Board
	X	1000-1025	Bureau of Consumer Financial Protection
9		1026-1099	Bureau of Consumer Financial Protection
10	XI	1100-1199	Federal Financial Institutions Examination Council
	XII	1200-1299	Federal Housing Finance Agency
	XIII	1300-1399	Financial Stability Oversight Council
	XIV	1400-1499	Farm Credit System Insurance Corporation
	XV	1500-1599	Department of the Treasury
	XVI	1600-1699	Office of Financial Research
	XVII	1700-1799	Office of Federal Housing Enterprise Oversight, Department of Housing and Urban Development
	XVIII	1800-1899	Community Development Financial Institutions Fund, Department of the Treasury
