= David M. Kennedy (politician) =

American politician (1905–1996)

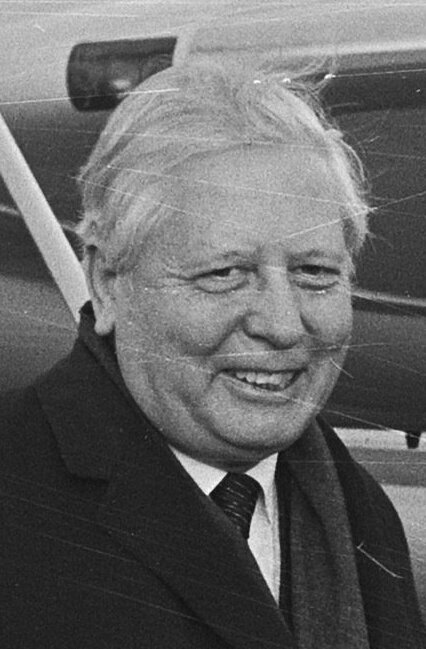
- Kennedy in 1970

8th United States Ambassador to NATO
- In office March 17, 1972 – February 1, 1973
- President: Richard Nixon
- Preceded by: Robert Ellsworth
- Succeeded by: Donald Rumsfeld

60th United States Secretary of the Treasury
- In office January 22, 1969 – February 11, 1971
- President: Richard Nixon
- Preceded by: Joseph W. Barr
- Succeeded by: John Connally

Personal details
- Born: David Matthew Kennedy; July 21, 1905 Randolph, Utah, U.S.
- Died: May 1, 1996 (aged 90) Salt Lake City, Utah, U.S.
- Party: Republican
- Spouse: Lenora Bingham (m. 1925; died 1995)
- Children: 4
- Relatives: Jaxson Dart (great-grandson)
- Education: Weber State University; George Washington University; Rutgers University, New Brunswick

David Matthew Kennedy (July 21, 1905 – May 1, 1996) was an American politician and businessman. He served as the 60th U.S. Secretary of the Treasury and later as the 8th U.S. Ambassador to NATO, both under U.S. President Richard Nixon. He was Chief Executive and Chairman of the Board of Continental Illinois during the 1950s and 1960s.

== Early life ==
Kennedy was born on July 21, 1905, in Randolph, Utah, to George and Katherine Kennedy (née Johnson). His father was a rancher and served in Utah state government. His mother was ill for much of his childhood and the family grew up in Kaysville and later Ogden. His grandparents John Kennedy and Peter Johnson formed the Bank of Randolph.

As a member of the Church of Jesus Christ of Latter-day Saints (LDS Church), Kennedy married Lenora Margaret Bingham in the church's Salt Lake Temple in November 1925. Shortly thereafter he served as a missionary for the church in Liverpool, England. His mission presidents were James E. Talmage and John A. Widtsoe.

Kennedy attended public schools and received a bachelor's degree from Weber State University, graduating in 1928. His first government job was as a staff member for the Federal Reserve Board of Governors. During this time he built up his financial experience and later became assistant to then-Fed Chairman Marriner Eccles. Kennedy was also attending George Washington University and received master's and law degrees from there in 1935 and 1937. He completed the Stonier Graduate School of Banking program, then housed at Rutgers University, New Brunswick, in 1939.

== Chicago years ==
He left the Federal Reserve and joined Continental of Illinois in 1946, starting in their bond department. By 1951, he was a bank President and later served as Chairman of the Board and CEO from 1959 to 1969. At the time of his appointment as Treasury Secretary in 1969, Continental Illinois ranked as the 15th largest bank in the world.

Kennedy served as counselor to John K. Edmunds in the presidency of the LDS Church's Chicago Stake. He was also a member of the board of Nauvoo Restoration from its founding in 1962, and advised David O. McKay, Harold B. Lee and other LDS Church leaders on banking matters. It was in part due to the advice of Kennedy that McKay restructured the management of Zions First National Bank so that the church's president no longer held the title of bank president, with Orval Adams assuming that title.

During these same years, Kennedy also served as chairman of Mayor Richard J. Daley's Mayor's Committee for Economic and Cultural Growth in Chicago. In 1957, Kennedy became a member of the board of trustees of the University of Chicago. While serving in this post, he was involved in fundraising. In 1966, he was asked to head a fundraising drive for Brigham Young University (BYU). He worked on this project until becoming the US Treasury Secretary.

From 1961 until January 1969, Kennedy was a member of the board of trustees of the Brookings Institution. In 1963, he commissioned a house in Winnetka, Illinois.

== Government service ==
Kennedy served as a special assistant on debt management to Treasury Secretary George M. Humphrey. He also served on the staff of the Board of Governors of the Federal Reserve system from 1930 to 1946, ending up assistant to the Chairman.

In October 1962, U.S. President John F. Kennedy (no relation) appointed him a member of a private corporation (COMSAT) to own and operate the United States' share of a global satellite communications system. He was elected to the permanent board of directors in 1964.

In 1967, U.S. President Lyndon B. Johnson appointed Kennedy as chairman of the Commission on Budgetary Concepts, whose recommendations were adopted as standard government budgetary practice.

Kennedy was nominated by Nixon to be the 60th Secretary of the Treasury. He served from 1969 until 1971. Nixon, who had little interest in economics and expected his top economic advisers to run that portfolio, fairly quickly concluded that Kennedy was not up to the task, being weak both on policy-making and as a lead economics spokesman for the administration. Nixon concluded Kennedy was a "cipher" and by April 1970 told aide John Ehrlichman that Kennedy was to be replaced.

Kennedy served as the U.S. Ambassador to NATO from March 1972 to February 1973.

He founded the US-Taiwan Business Council in 1976, and served as its Chairman for fourteen years, until 1990.

== Church service and personal life ==
He also served as a special representative of the LDS Church's First Presidency. This assignment required him to represent the church around the world, meeting with government and ecclesiastical leaders.

In 1985, the David M. Kennedy Center for International Studies at BYU opened and is named in his honor.

Kennedy married Lenora Bingham on November 4, 1925. They had four daughters, Marilyn Taylor, Barbara Law, Carol Davis, and Patricia. His wife died in 1995. Kennedy himself died in Salt Lake City, Utah, on May 1, 1996, from cardiovascular disease and congestive heart failure, at the age of 90. He was interred in Randolph City Cemetery, near to his birthplace in Randolph, Utah.

His great-grandson and the grandson of his daughter Patricia is Jaxson Dart, quarterback in the NFL.

== Biography ==
- Hickman, Martin Berkeley (1987), David Matthew Kennedy: Banker, Statesman, Churchman, Deseret Book Co., in cooperation with the David M. Kennedy Center for International Studies, ISBN 0-87579-093-3

Political offices
| Preceded by Joseph W. Barr | U.S. Secretary of the Treasury; Served under: Richard Nixon; 1969–1971 | Succeeded by John Connally |
Diplomatic posts
| Preceded by Robert Ellsworth | United States Permanent Representative to NATO; 1972–1973 | Succeeded by Donald Rumsfeld |
