= Ray M. Gidney =

Ray Gidney
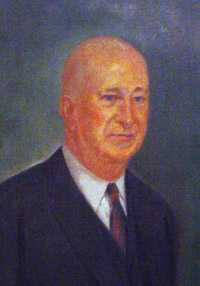

20th Comptroller of the Currency
- In office April 16, 1953 – November 15, 1961
- President: Dwight D. Eisenhower; John F. Kennedy
- Preceded by: Preston Delano
- Succeeded by: James J. Saxon

President of the Federal Reserve Bank of Cleveland
- In office November 1, 1944 – April 16, 1953
- Preceded by: Matthew Fleming
- Succeeded by: Wilbur Fulton

Acting Chair of the Federal Deposit Insurance Corporation
- In office September 6, 1957 - September 17, 1957
- Preceded by: Henry E. Cook
- Succeeded by: Jesse P. Wolcott

Personal details
- Born: Ray Millard Gidney; January 17, 1887; Santa Barbara, California, U.S.
- Died: October 21, 1978 (aged 91); Jacksonville, Florida, U.S.
- Education: University of California, Berkeley (BA)

Ray Millard Gidney (January 17, 1887 – October 21, 1978) was a United States Comptroller of the Currency from 1953 to 1961.

Ray M. Gidney was named Comptroller by President Dwight D. Eisenhower after a long and distinguished career in banking. He served as president of the Federal Reserve Bank of Cleveland prior to his appointment from 1944 to 1953

Gidney was known for the quiet and competent manner in which he ran the Office of the Comptroller of the Currency. He resigned to accept a position with a large bank in Jacksonville, Florida.

Other offices
Preceded by Matthew Fleming	President of the Federal Reserve Bank of Cleveland; 1944–1953	Succeeded by Wilbur Fulton
