= William B. Camp =

American politician (1913–1975)

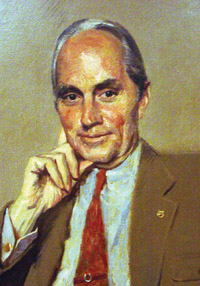

22nd Comptroller of the Currency
- In office November 16, 1966 – March 23, 1973
- President: Lyndon B. Johnson; Richard M. Nixon
- Preceded by: James J. Saxon
- Succeeded by: James E. Smith

Acting Chair of the Federal Deposit Insurance Corporation
- In office March 9, 1970 - April 1, 1970
- Preceded by: Kenneth A. Randall
- Succeeded by: Frank Wille

Personal details
- Born: November 25, 1913 Greenville, Texas
- Died: November 13, 1975 (aged 61) Rockville, Maryland
- Occupation: national bank examiner

William Bacon Camp (November 25, 1913 – November 13, 1975) was Comptroller of the Currency from 1966 to 1973. He was born in Greenville, Texas.

Camp, a national bank examiner, was appointed Comptroller by President Lyndon Johnson. During his term, a rapidly growing economy led to a dramatic increase in the assets held by national banks.

The agency's remaining responsibility in the issue of currency - redeeming Federal Reserve notes - was transferred to the Treasurer of the United States. Camp is unique among Comptrollers: he was nominated by a president from one political party and renominated by a president, Richard Nixon, from another. He died on November 13, 1975, in Rockville, Maryland.
