= Erle Cocke Sr. =

American politician (1895–1977)

Egbert Erle Cocke Sr.
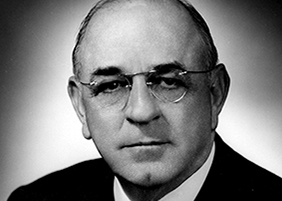

Chair of the Federal Deposit Insurance Corporation
- In office January 20, 1961 - August 4, 1963
- President: John F. Kennedy
- Preceded by: Jesse P. Wolcott
- Succeeded by: Joseph W. Barr

Personal details
- Born: June 26, 1895 Lee County, Georgia, US
- Died: October 7, 1977 (aged 82) Atlanta, Georgia, US
- Spouse: India Elise Meadows

Egbert Erle Cocke Sr. (June 26, 1895-October 7, 1977) was an American banker and public servant. Born in Georgia, he played roles in both the private banking sector and federal financial institutions.

== Career ==
Cocke was involved in veterans' affairs, serving as National Vice Commander of The American Legion from 1922 to 1923, a commitment further exemplified by his son, Erle Cocke Jr., who later became the youngest National Commander of The American Legion in 1950.

Cocke served overseas during World War I and in the late 1920s joined the Georgia State Senate. He was a financial observer at the 1964 Bretton Woods Conference that would lead to the establishment of the International Monetary Fund and post-World War II international financial relations. During the 1930s, he headed the Atlanta, Georgia, branch of the Reconstruction Finance Corporation. Cocke became the sixth Chairman of the FDIC on January 20, 1961, and served until August 4, 1963. He became President of the American Bankers Association from 1966 to 1969, and over 20 years had served in various executive positions with the Fulton National Bank in Atlanta, eventually becoming its CEO.
