= Mark Paterson =

Mark Paterson may refer to:

- Mark Paterson (animator), New Zealand animator
- Mark Paterson (ice hockey) (born 1964), retired Canadian ice hockey player
- Mark Paterson (field hockey) (born 1985), Australian field hockey player
- Mark Paterson (public servant) (born 1954), senior Australian public servant
- Mark Paterson (sailor) (1947–2022), New Zealand sailor who competed at the 1976 Summer Olympics
- Mark Paterson (sound engineer), British sound engineer

== See also ==
- Mark Patterson (disambiguation)
- Mark Pattison (disambiguation)
