= Charles B. Brownson =

American politician (1914–1988)

Charles Brownson
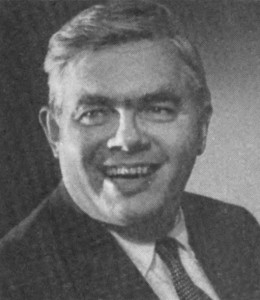
- Brownson in 1957

Member of the U.S. House of Representatives from Indiana's 11th district
- In office January 3, 1951 – January 3, 1959
- Preceded by: Andrew Jacobs Sr.
- Succeeded by: Joseph W. Barr

Personal details
- Born: February 5, 1914 Jackson, Michigan, United States
- Died: August 4, 1988 (aged 74) Alexandria, Virginia, United States
- Resting place: Arlington National Cemetery, Virginia, United States
- Party: Republican
- Education: University of Michigan

Military service
- Allegiance: United States
- Years of service: 1941–1974

Charles Bruce Brownson (February 5, 1914 – August 4, 1988) was an American World War II veteran who served four terms as a U.S. representative from Indiana from 1951 to 1959.

== Biography ==
Born in Jackson, Michigan, Brownson moved with his parents to Flint, Michigan, in 1916. He attended public schools. He graduated from the University of Michigan in 1935. He entered Infantry Reserve training in 1935. He moved to Indianapolis, Indiana, in October 1936 and established the Central Wallpaper & Paint Corp.

=== World War II ===
Brownson entered active duty as a first lieutenant Infantry Reserve on February 10, 1941. He served as Assistant Chief of Staff, G-1, Eighty-third Infantry Division, in 1943, then as Executive officer to Assistant Chief of Staff G-1, First Army, during invasion planning in England and combat in Europe until V-E Day, and then transferred with First Army Planning Headquarters to Canlubang, Philippine Islands, August 5, 1945. He was released from active duty February 27, 1946, as a lieutenant colonel, Army Reserve, and retired as a colonel in 1974. He was awarded the Legion of Merit, Bronze Star Medal, and French Medaille de Reconnaissance. He served as chairman of the Marion County Juvenile Court Advisory Council in 1948 and 1949.

=== American Legion ===
He was an active member of The American Legion and belonged to John H. Holliday Jr. American Legion Post 186 in Indianapolis. He was elected as the 33rd Commander of the Department of Indiana's 11th District, encompassing all of Marion County-including Indianapolis, serving from the time of his election in the summer of 1949 until his declaration as a candidate for the United States Congress in 1950.

=== Congress ===
Brownson was elected as a Republican to the Eighty-second and to the three succeeding Congresses (January 3, 1951 – January 3, 1959) representing Indiana's 11th Congressional District. Brownson voted in favor of the Civil Rights Act of 1957. He was an unsuccessful candidate for reelection in 1958 to the Eighty-sixth Congress.

=== Later career and death ===
Brownson served as assistant administrator for public affairs and congressional liaison, Housing and Home Finance Agency, Washington, D.C. from 1959 to 1964. He was editor and publisher of Congressional Staff Directory. He engaged in public relations in Washington, D.C. from 1961 to 1985. He was a resident of Coral Gables, Florida, and Mount Vernon, Virginia, until his death in Alexandria, Virginia, on August 4, 1988. He was interred in Arlington National Cemetery.

U.S. House of Representatives
Preceded by Andrew Jacobs Sr.	Member of the U.S. House of Representatives from Indiana's 11th congressional district January 3, 1951 – January 3, 1959	Succeeded by Joseph W. Barr
