= Mark Pattison =

Mark Pattison may refer to:

- Mark Pattison (academic) (1813–1884), English author, priest, and rector
- Mark Pattison (American football) (born 1961), NFL wide receiver
- Marc Pattison, musician in Futures End

== See also ==
- Mark Patterson (disambiguation)
- Mark Paterson (disambiguation)
