= Mark A. Patterson =

American lawyer

Mark Patterson

Chief of Staff to the Secretary of the Treasury
- In office February 2009 – May 2015
- President: Barack Obama
- Succeeded by: Christian Weideman

Personal details
- Born: 1961 or 1962 (age 64–65) New York City, New York, U.S.
- Party: Democratic
- Spouse: Jennifer Leete
- Education: University at Albany (BA); Catholic University (JD)

Mark A. Patterson is an American lobbyist, former vice president and managing director of Goldman Sachs, and former Chief of Staff to the United States Secretary of the Treasury. In 2018, he was hired as general counsel for Senator Chuck Schumer, overseeing investigations and appropriations and leaving his position at law firm Perkins Coie.

== Early life and education ==
Patterson was born in New York City. His mother was a librarian while his father was a high school English teacher. He graduated from the University at Albany in 1984. He received his J.D. degree from The Catholic University of America in 1990.

== Career ==
Patterson was the special assistant of Senator Daniel Patrick Moynihan from 1984 to 1988 before entering law school.

Patterson later served as Moynihan's legislative director (1993-1995), and as Democratic staff director and chief counsel of the Senate Finance Committee (1995-1999). From 1999 to 2004 Patterson was the policy director for Senate Democratic Leader Tom Daschle.

In 2004 Patterson became a lobbyist for Goldman Sachs, with the position of vice president (2004-2007), and managing director (2007-2008). Patterson left Goldman Sachs in April 2008, after which time he served as a volunteer for the Obama-Biden presidential campaign, and as the Senate confirmation coordinator for the Obama-Biden Presidential Transition Project. Upon the inauguration of Barack Obama as President, Patterson was in February 2009 appointed chief of staff to the Secretary of the Treasury. In 2013, after the long-anticipated departure of secretary Tim Geithner, secretary Jack Lew announced Patterson's replacement. Patterson worked as a partner in Perkins Coie's Washington, D.C. office before joining Senator Schumer's team in May 2018.

== Personal life ==
Patterson is married to Jennifer S. Leete, a former assistant director in the Enforcement Division of the U.S. Securities and Exchange Commission and, as of 2022, a partner in the start-up Washington, D.C. office of New York law firm Cravath, Swaine & Moore. The start-up was being led by Jelena McWilliams, former chair of the FDIC, and also included Elad Roisman, former commissioner and acting chair of the SEC. Patterson is a member of the bar of the District of Columbia and of the Supreme Court of the United States.
