= Donald C. Bruce =

American politician (1921–1969)

Don Bruce
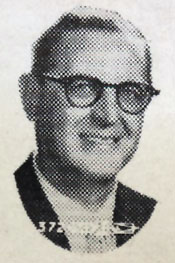

Member of the U.S. House of Representatives from Indiana's 11th district
- In office January 3, 1961 – January 3, 1965
- Preceded by: Joseph W. Barr
- Succeeded by: Andrew Jacobs Jr.

Personal details
- Born: Donald Cogley Bruce; April 27, 1921 Troutville, Pennsylvania, U.S.
- Died: August 31, 1969 (aged 48) Round Hill, Virginia, U.S.
- Party: Republican
- Education: Muskingum University

Donald Cogley Bruce (April 27, 1921 – August 31, 1969) was an American broadcaster and politician who served two terms as a U.S. representative from Indiana from 1961 to 1965. He was a founder of the American Conservative Union.

== Biography ==
Born in Troutville, Pennsylvania, Bruce graduated from high school in Allentown, Pennsylvania, and attended Muskingum College in New Concord, Ohio. He was employed in the radio broadcasting industry for twenty years, serving as program director, business manager, and general manager.

=== Congress ===
In 1960 he was elected to the United States House of Representatives as a Republican from Indiana, serving two terms before being defeated in the 1964 senatorial primary. Bruce voted in favor of the Civil Rights Act of 1964, as well as the 24th Amendment to the U.S. Constitution.

=== American Conservative Union ===
Following the landslide defeat of U.S. Senator Barry Goldwater in the November presidential election, Bruce joined with other conservatives to discuss responses to the seeming liberal triumph represented by Lyndon Johnson's reelection. This led to a subsequent meeting in December at which the nascent organization was named the American Conservative Union. Bruce was elected as the ACU's first chairman, a position he held until October of the following year.

He also established Bruce Enterprises, a management and political consulting firm.

=== Death and burial ===
Bruce died of a heart attack on August 31, 1969 in Round Hill, Virginia and is buried nearby.

== See also ==
- List of members of the House Un-American Activities Committee

U.S. House of Representatives
| Preceded by Joseph W. Barr | Member of the U.S. House of Representatives from Indiana's 11th congressional district 1961–1965 | Succeeded by Andrew Jacobs Jr. |
