= Frank Wille =

American politician (1931–1988)

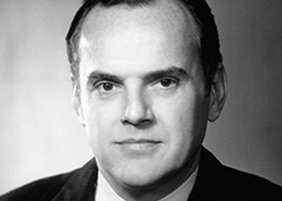

Chair of the Federal Deposit Insurance Corporation
- In office April 1, 1970-March 16, 1976
- Preceded by: William B. Camp
- Succeeded by: James E. Smith

Personal details
- Born: February 27, 1931 New York, New York
- Died: July 6, 1988 (aged 57) Greenwich, Connecticut
- Education: Harvard College (BA); New York University School of Law (LLM)
- Occupation: national bank examiner

Frank Wille (February 27, 1931 – July 8, 1988 was Chairman of the Federal Deposit Insurance Corporation from 1970 to 1976. He was born in New York, New York.
