= Joseph W. Barr =

American politician (1918–1996)

Joseph Barr
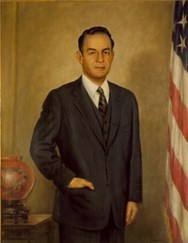

59th United States Secretary of the Treasury
- In office December 21, 1968 – January 20, 1969
- President: Lyndon B. Johnson
- Preceded by: Henry H. Fowler
- Succeeded by: David M. Kennedy

Undersecretary of the Treasury
- In office 1965 – December 21, 1968
- President: Lyndon B. Johnson

Chair of the Federal Deposit Insurance Corporation
- In office January 22, 1964 – April 21, 1965
- Preceded by: James J. Saxon
- Succeeded by: Kenneth A. Randall

Member of the U.S. House of Representatives from Indiana's 11th district
- In office January 3, 1959 – January 3, 1961
- Preceded by: Charles B. Brownson
- Succeeded by: Donald C. Bruce

Personal details
- Born: Joseph Walker Barr; January 17, 1918 Bicknell, Indiana, U.S.
- Died: February 23, 1996 (aged 78) Playa del Carmen, Mexico
- Resting place: Leeds Episcopal Church Cemetery in Hume, Virginia
- Party: Democratic
- Spouse: Beth Williston
- Children: 5
- Education: DePauw University (BA); Harvard University (MA)

Military service
- Allegiance: United States
- Branch/service: United States Navy
- Years of service: 1942–1945
- Battles/wars: World War II

Joseph Walker Barr (January 17, 1918 – February 23, 1996) was an American businessman and politician from Indiana. He served one term in the United States House of Representatives from 1959 to 1961. He was also briefly the United States Secretary of the Treasury from December 21, 1968, until January 20, 1969, in President Lyndon B. Johnson's cabinet. He was a member of the Democratic Party.

== Early life and career ==
Barr was born in Vincennes, Indiana, on January 17, 1918, the son of Oscar Lynn Barr and Stella Florence Walker. He graduated from DePauw University, and married the former Beth Ann Williston in Indianapolis on September 3, 1939; they had five children: Bonnie Barr Gilliom, Cherry Ann Barr, Joseph Williston Barr, Elizabeth Eugenia Barr LoSasso and Lynn Hamilton Barr Fineberg. He was a member of the Phi Kappa Psi fraternity and earned a master's degree in economics from Harvard University in Cambridge, Massachusetts, in 1941.

=== World War II ===
He served in the United States Navy from 1942 to 1945, during World War II, with subchaser duty in the Mediterranean Sea and Atlantic Ocean. He received a Bronze Star for sinking a submarine off Anzio Beach.

=== Early career ===
After Barr returned from the war, he engaged in the operation of grain elevators, theaters, real estate and publishing businesses.

== Political career ==
=== Congress ===
In 1958, he defeated Charles B. Brownson for a seat in Congress from Indiana's 11th congressional district, a Republican stronghold. He was aided by Democratic gains that increased the party's majority from 35 to 129 seats. During his time in the House, he became friends with then-Senator John F. Kennedy. He served only one term before being defeated for re-election in 1960.

=== FDIC ===
After his electoral defeat, President Kennedy appointed him as the Assistant to the Secretary of the Treasury for Congressional Relations. In 1963, he was appointed Chairman of the Federal Deposit Insurance Corporation. Barr served as the Undersecretary of the Treasury from 1965 to 1968, during the administration of President Lyndon B. Johnson.

=== Treasury Secretary ===
When Henry H. Fowler resigned in December 1968, Johnson named Barr as the Secretary of the Treasury with a recess appointment, effective for the remainder of Johnson's term in office. His 30 days in the position was the shortest term of any Treasury Secretary. Given his short period in office, his signature appears only on the one-dollar bill.

== Later years ==
After leaving office, he was named as the vice chairman of American Security and Trust Company. He then served as the president and the chairman from 1969 to 1974 and the chairman of Federal Home Loan Bank in Atlanta, Georgia from 1977 to 1981.

Barr died of a heart attack in Playa del Carmen, Mexico, and is interred in Leeds Episcopal Church Cemetery in Hume, Virginia.

U.S. House of Representatives
Preceded by Charles B. Brownson	Member of the U.S. House of Representatives from Indiana's 11th congressional district January 3, 1959 – January 3, 1961	Succeeded by Donald C. Bruce
Political offices
Preceded by Henry H. Fowler	U.S. Secretary of the Treasury; Served under: Lyndon B. Johnson; December 21, 1968 – January 20, 1969	Succeeded by David M. Kennedy
