= Jelena McWilliams =

Serbian-American business executive (born 1973)

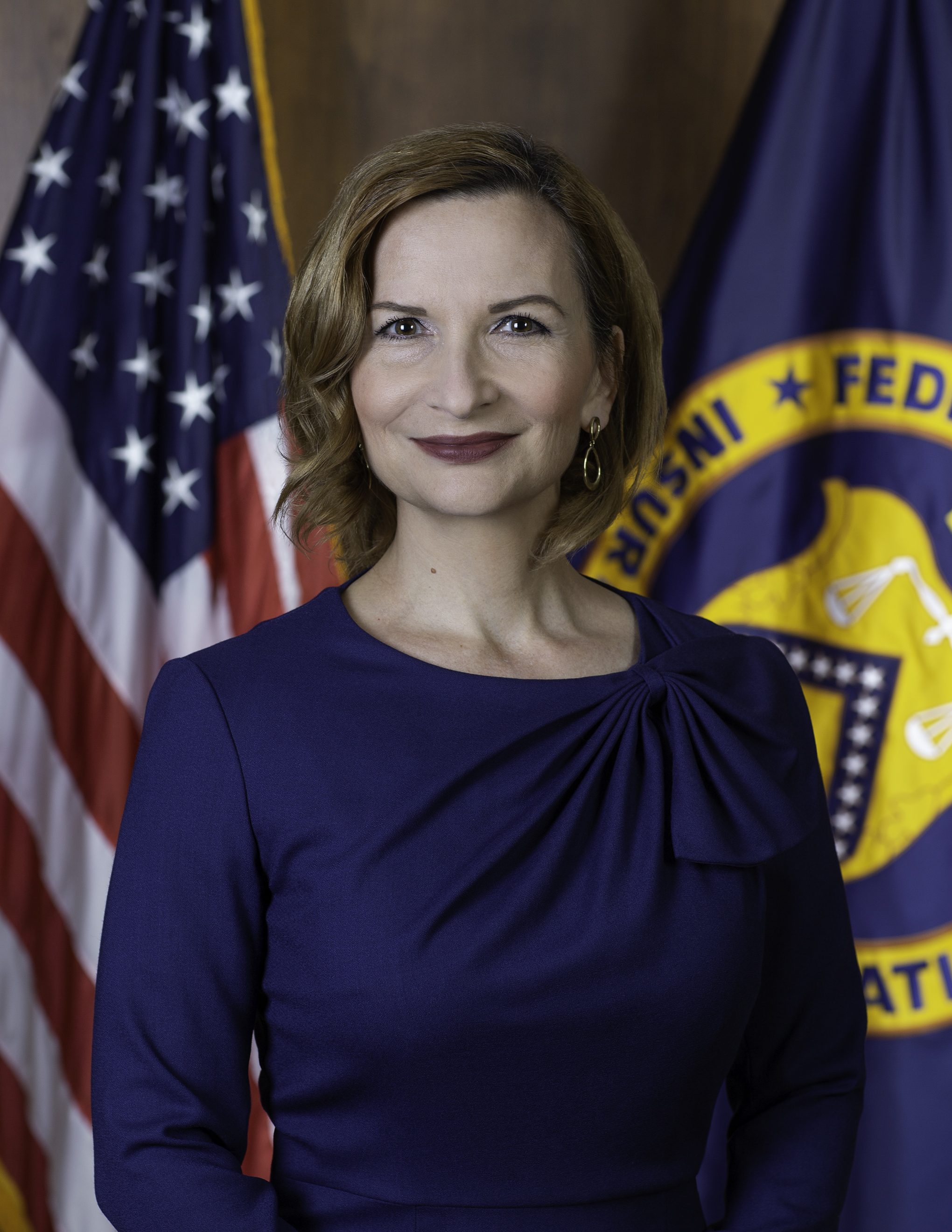
- Official portrait, 2020

Chair of the Federal Deposit Insurance Corporation
- In office June 5, 2018 – February 4, 2022
- President: Donald Trump; Joe Biden
- Preceded by: Martin J. Gruenberg
- Succeeded by: Martin J. Gruenberg

Member of the Board of Directors of the Federal Deposit Insurance Corporation
- In office June 5, 2018 – February 4, 2022
- President: Donald Trump; Joe Biden
- Preceded by: Thomas M. Hoenig
- Succeeded by: Jonathan McKernan

Personal details
- Born: Jelena Obrenić; July 29, 1973 (age 51); Belgrade, Serbia, Yugoslavia
- Political party: Republican
- Education: University of California, Berkeley (BA, JD)

Jelena McWilliams (née Obrenić; born July 29, 1973) is a Serbian-American business executive and a former chairman of the Federal Deposit Insurance Corporation. She was nominated to the position and to the FDIC Board of Directors by President Donald Trump, and the Senate confirmed her appointment on May 24, 2018. She was sworn in as chairman on June 5, 2018. Previously, McWilliams was executive vice president and chief legal officer of Fifth Third Bank in Cincinnati, Ohio. She resigned from her position as chairman of the Board of the FDIC on February 4, 2022.

== Early life and education ==
Born Jelena Obrenić (Serbian Cyrillic: Јелена Обренић) in Belgrade, Serbia, in the former Yugoslavia, McWilliams traveled to the United States at age 18 as part of a high-school exchange program. She attended the University of California at Berkeley for college. She funded her education by working a series of minimum-wage jobs. She wrote her thesis on the war in her native Yugoslavia. McWilliams graduated with highest honors with a Bachelor of Arts in political science and went on to earn her Juris Doctor degree from the UC Berkeley School of Law.

== Career ==
McWilliams began practicing law working with tech firms at Morrison & Foerster LLP in Palo Alto, California and then moved to Hogan & Hartson LLP, now Hogan Lovells LLP, in Washington, D.C.

From 2007 to 2010, McWilliams worked as a lawyer at the Federal Reserve Board of Governors, where she focused on a proposal for rules meant to make it easier for consumers to dispute mistakes on their credit reports and to understand their mortgages.

McWilliams worked in the United States Senate for six years, first as assistant chief counsel for the Small Business and Entrepreneurship Committee and then as chief counsel and deputy staff director for the Committee on Banking, Housing and Urban Affairs. At the banking committee, McWilliams worked with chairpersons Senator Richard Shelby (R, Alabama) and Senator Mike Crapo (R, Idaho) on, among other issues, the implementation of and efforts to rework or repeal the 2010 Dodd-Frank banking-regulation reform act.

McWilliams served as executive vice president, chief legal officer, and corporate secretary for Fifth Third from January 2017 until May 2018.

=== Chairman of the FDIC ===
On November 30, 2017, the White House press secretary issued a release announcing the President's intention to nominate McWilliams to serve as chairperson of the FDIC. McWilliams had been under consideration for the appointment since July 2017, when James Clinger withdrew his nomination for the position.

By year-end 2017, Fifth Third determined that if McWilliams were confirmed as FDIC head, it would not move to have her return the $300,000 signing bonus the bank had paid her when she joined its staff.

Before McWilliams' confirmation, The Wall Street Journal previewed the proposed change in leadership at the FDIC, along with changes at the Federal Reserve and the Office of the Comptroller of the Currency, saying banks "can expect to see significant further relief" from post-2008 financial crisis rules under the new leadership. In that context, the article referenced Dodd-Frank, The Volcker Rule, the Community Reinvestment Act, small-dollar loans ("Trump officials have said they want to encourage banks to offer loan products that compete" with payday lenders), new banks (from 237 new banks approved by the FDIC in 2005, two were approved in 2016 and seven in 2017; "McWilliams has said she wants to speed up new-bank approvals"), fintech, leveraged lending (loans to heavily in debted companies), cybersecurity ("McWilliams cited cybersecurity as one of her priorities during her Senate testimony"), and capital, liquidity and overall and supplementary leverage rules.

In late December 2021, McWilliams announced her resignation, effective February 4, 2022. Following the election of President Joe Biden in 2020, Democrats had controlled all the seats on the FDIC except for the one she held. About two weeks before McWilliams resigned she had expressed her frustrations and intent in an essay published in the Wall Street Journal. In the piece she had described in detail what she called the erosion of agency norms and a "hostile takeover" attempt by the other directors. Parts of her opinion piece had stated,

Of the 20 chairmen who preceded me at the FDIC, nine faced a majority of the board members from the opposing party, including Mr. Gruenberg as chairman under President Trump until I replaced him as chairman in 2018. Never before has a majority of the board attempted to circumvent the chairman to pursue their own agenda. ... I will continue to manage the agency pursuant to the oath I took. And my door is always open to those willing to engage in a manner that befits the venerated institution we are privileged to serve.

In the piece, McWilliams had also cited the loss of her "family’s meager savings [which] disappeared overnight when a local bank collapsed at the onset of Yugoslavia’s civil war." The country didn't have deposit insurance and, at age 68, her father "went to work as a laborer earning $5 a day." She had followed the personal reminiscence with, "You don’t need that kind of firsthand experience to understand why stability at the FDIC is paramount for our nation."

=== Post-FDIC ===
In June 2022, McWilliams was announced as joining the law firm Cravath, Swaine & Moore to help set up an office in Washington. She will lead the new office and be joined by Elad Roisman, former commissioner and acting chair of the Securities and Exchange Commission, and Jennifer S. Leete, former associate director in the SEC's Division of Enforcement "as partners, Cravath said. It will be the firm’s third office, joining existing ones in London and New York."

== Personal life ==
McWilliams, who is a single mother, has one daughter. She moved her parents from Yugoslavia to the United States after saving enough money to do so.

Political offices
Preceded by Thomas M. Hoenig	Member of the board of directors of the Federal Deposit Insurance Corporation; 2018–2022	Vacant
Preceded by Martin J. Gruenberg	Chair of the Federal Deposit Insurance Corporation; 2018–2022	Succeeded by Martin J. Gruenberg; Acting
