= Federal Financing Bank =

United States government corporation

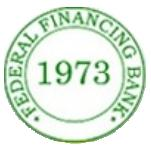

Agency overview
- Formed: December 29, 1973
- Headquarters: Treasury Building Washington, D.C.
- Employees: 27
- Agency executive: Christopher L. Tuttle, Director/Chief Financial Officer
- Parent department: Department of the Treasury
- Website: ffb.treasury.gov

The Federal Financing Bank (FFB) is a United States government corporation created by Congress in 1973 under the general supervision of the secretary of the treasury. The FFB was established to centralize and reduce the cost of federal borrowing, as well as federally assisted borrowing from the public. The FFB was also established to deal with federal budget management issues which occurred when off-budget financing flooded the government securities market with offers of a variety of government-backed securities that were competing with Treasury securities. The FFB has statutory authority to purchase obligations issued, sold, or guaranteed by federal agencies; agency guarantees may cover all or part of the principal or interest.

As of 30 September 2025, the FFB's net loans receivable totaled $220.74 billion and its net position was $7.19 billion.

== See also ==
- Title 12 of the Code of Federal Regulations
- United States Department of the Treasury
