= Preston Delano =

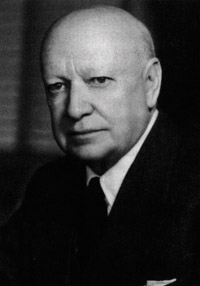

19th Comptroller of the Currency
- In office October 24, 1938 – February 15, 1953
- President: Franklin D. Roosevelt; Harry S. Truman; Dwight D. Eisenhower
- Preceded by: J. F. T. O'Connor
- Succeeded by: Ray M. Gidney

Acting Chair of the Federal Deposit Insurance Corporation
- In office October 15, 1945 - January 5, 1946
- President: Harry S. Truman
- Preceded by: Leo Crowley
- Succeeded by: Maple T. Harl

Personal details
- Born: April 2, 1886 Phoenix, Michigan
- Died: August 31, 1961 (aged 75) Washington, D.C.
- Occupation: banker, businessman, investment counselor

Preston Brady Delano (April 2, 1886 – August 31, 1961) was a United States Comptroller of the Currency from October, 1938 to 1953. He inherited this Office from an Acting Comptroller of the Currency from April 1938 to September 1938 named Marshall R. Diggs.

He graduated from Stanford University in 1909.

Preston Delano held office for 14 years, the longest term of any Comptroller. Delano was a businessman, investment counselor, and served as governor of the Home Loan Bank Board when appointed Comptroller by President Franklin D. Roosevelt.

He was responsible for preserving and stabilizing the national banks during the Second World War, which vastly increased the volume of money needed for war expenditures, subsequently causing government debt to rise substantially. Delano entered retirement after his resignation.

== Personal life ==
Delano was the son of Moses Abbott Delano (1848-1930) and his wife, Ellen Verneo (nee Bennett) Delano (1848-1926). He was born in Phoenix, Michigan, but by the time of the 1900 United States Census the family was living in Fairhaven, Massachusetts, his father's birthplace; his Delano line had long lived in Fairhaven. On May 24, 1922 in Portland, Oregon, he married Ruth Small (April 29, 1891 – February 19, 1973).

Delano was a "distant cousin" of President Roosevelt, and part of the extended Delano family. They are 5th cousins to be exact, sharing the same pair of 4th great-grandparents Jonathan Delano (1647-1720) and Mercy (Warren) Delano (1657-1728). Another relative is his fourth cousin, once removed Columbus Delano, a United States Congressman from Ohio;
