= Donald E. Powell =

American banker (born 1941)

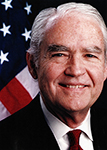

Chairman of the Federal Deposit Insurance Corporation
- In office August 29, 2001 – November 15, 2005
- President: George W. Bush
- Preceded by: John N. Reich (Acting)
- Succeeded by: Martin J. Gruenberg (Acting)

Personal details
- Born: Donald E. Powell; May 2, 1941 (age 85) Texas, US
- Spouse: Twanna Powell
- Education: West Texas State University
- Occupation: Banker

Donald E. Powell (born May 2, 1941) became the 18th chairman of the U.S. Federal Deposit Insurance Corporation (FDIC) on August 29, 2001, and served through November 15, 2005. He resigned to become Federal Coordinator of Gulf Coast recovery efforts following Hurricanes Katrina and Rita.

Prior to being named chairman of the FDIC by George W. Bush, Powell was president and CEO of The First National Bank of Amarillo, TX. He began his banking career in 1963 at First Federal Savings & Loan of Amarillo.

Powell has served on a variety of boards, most notably as chairman of the board of regents of the Texas A&M University System, advisory board member of the George Bush School of Government and Public Service, and chairman of the Amarillo Chamber of Commerce. Powell has also been a member of the City of Amarillo Housing Board and the boards of the Franklin Lindsay Student Aid Fund, the Cal Farley's Boys Ranch, High Plains Baptist Hospital, and the Harrington Regional Medical Center.

Powell currently serves as a member of the Amarillo Independent School District Board of Trustees.

Powell received his Bachelor of Science degree in economics from West Texas State University and is a graduate of The Southwestern Graduate School of Banking at Southern Methodist University.
