= Federal Deposit Insurance Corporation =

US government agency providing deposit insurance

- FDIC
- Seal

- Logo

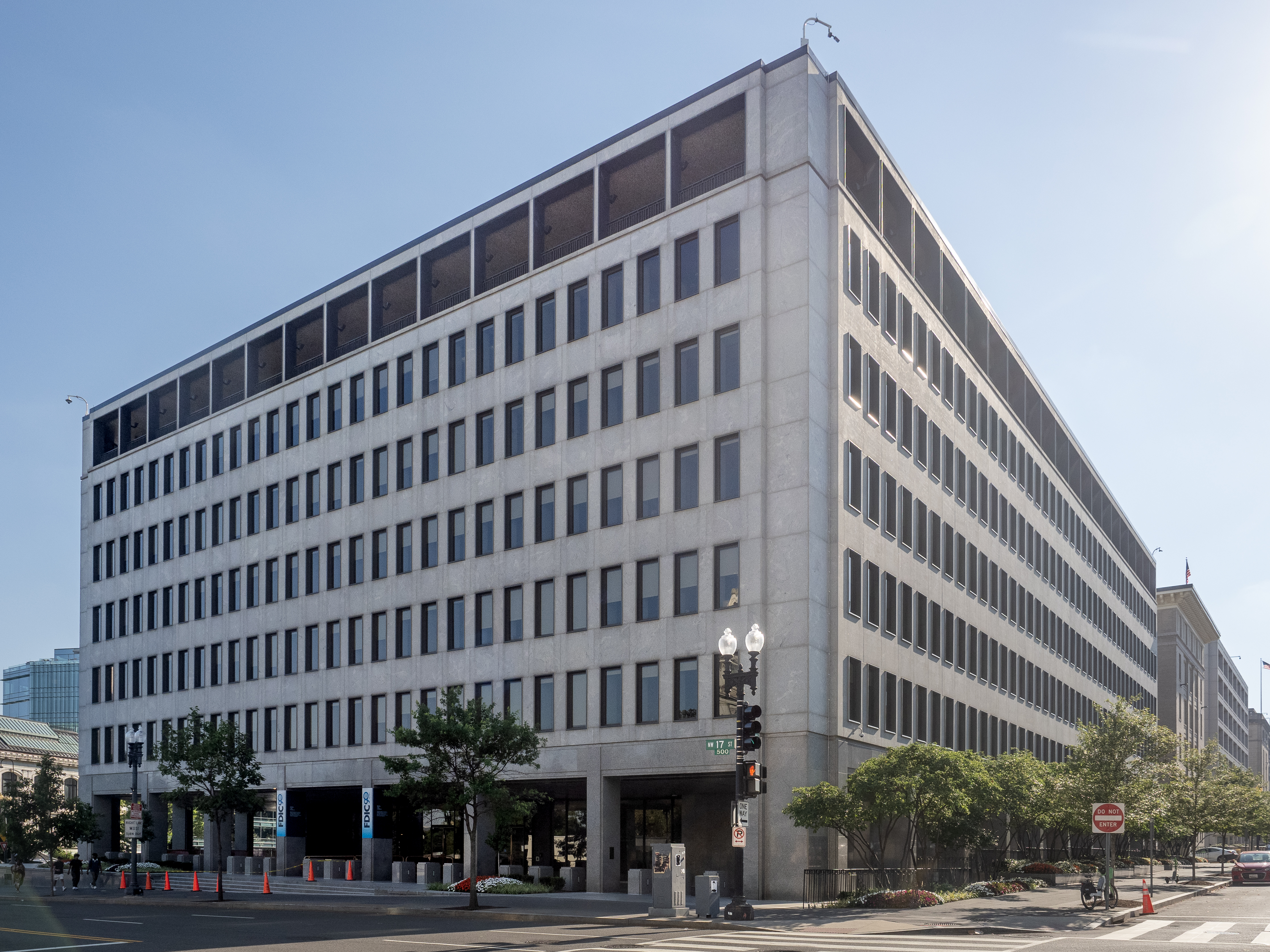
- Headquarters on 17th Street NW in Washington, D.C.

Agency overview
- Formed: June 16, 1933; 93 years ago
- Jurisdiction: Federal government of the United States
- Headquarters: 550 17th Street, NW Washington, DC 20429
- Employees: 5,137 (Q4 2025)
- Annual budget: $2.49 billion (2026)
- Agency executive: Travis Hill, Chairman
- Key document: Banking Act of 1933
- Website: fdic.gov

The Federal Deposit Insurance Corporation (FDIC) is a United States government corporation supplying deposit insurance to depositors in American commercial banks and savings banks. The FDIC was created by the Banking Act of 1933, enacted during the Great Depression to restore trust in the American banking system. More than one-third of banks failed in the years before the FDIC's creation, and bank runs were common. The insurance limit was initially US$2,500 per ownership category, and this has been increased several times over the years. FDIC deposit insurance covers up to $250,000 per depositor, per FDIC-insured bank, for each account ownership category. FDIC insurance is backed by the full faith and credit of the government of the United States, and according to the FDIC, "since its start in 1933 no depositor has ever lost a penny of FDIC-insured funds".

Deposits placed with non-bank fintech (financial technology) companies are not protected by the FDIC against failure of the fintech company. If the company places the money in an FDIC-insured bank account consumers are protected only under some conditions.

The FDIC is not supported by public funds; member banks' insurance dues are its primary source of funding. The FDIC charges premiums based upon the risk that the insured bank poses. When dues and the proceeds of bank liquidations are insufficient, it can borrow from the federal government, or issue debt through the Federal Financing Bank on terms that the bank decides.

As of December 2025, the FDIC provided deposit insurance at 4,336 institutions. As of June 30, 2026, the Deposit Insurance Fund (DIF) stood at $161.1 billion, with a reserve ratio of 1.48%.

The FDIC also examines and supervises certain financial institutions for safety and soundness, performs certain consumer-protection functions, and manages receiverships of failed banks. Quarterly reports are published indicating details of the banks' financial performance, including leverage ratio (but not CET1 Capital Requirements & Liquidity Coverage Ratio as specified in Basel III).

== Member bank liquidity requirements ==
To qualify for deposit insurance, member banks must follow certain liquidity and reserve requirements. Banks are classified in five groups according to their risk-based capital ratio:

- Well capitalized: 10% or higher
- Adequately capitalized: 8% or higher
- Undercapitalized: less than 8%
- Significantly undercapitalized: less than 6%
- Critically undercapitalized: less than 2%

When a bank becomes undercapitalized, the institution's primary regulator issues a warning to the bank. When the number drops below 6%, the primary regulator can change management and force the bank to take other corrective action. When the bank becomes critically undercapitalized the chartering authority closes the institution and appoints the FDIC as receiver of the bank.

== Insurance coverage ==
The FDIC insures deposits at member banks in the event that a bank fails—that is, the bank's regulating authority decides that it no longer meets the requirements for remaining in business.

=== Covered deposits ===
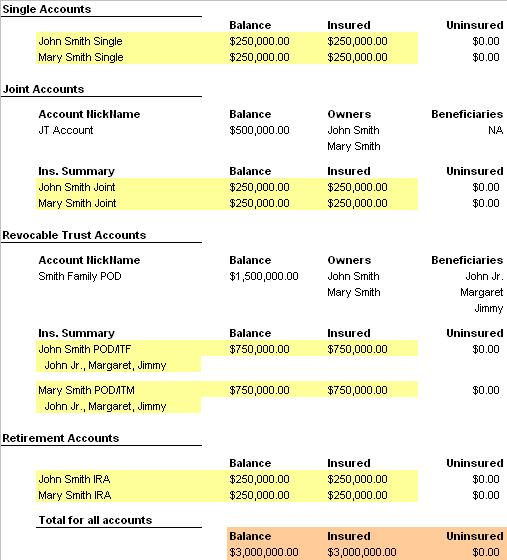
Example of FDIC insurance coverage

FDIC deposit insurance covers deposit accounts, which, by the FDIC definition, include:

- checking accounts and negotiable order of withdrawal (NOW) accounts (interest-bearing checking accounts with a hold option)
- savings accounts and money market deposit accounts (MMDAs, i.e., higher-interest savings accounts subject to check-writing restrictions)
- time deposits including certificates of deposit (CDs)
- outstanding cashier's checks, interest checks, and other negotiable instruments drawn on the accounts of the bank
- accounts denominated in foreign currencies

Accounts at different banks are insured separately. All branches of a bank are considered to form a single bank. Also, an Internet bank that is part of a brick and mortar bank is not considered to be a separate bank, even if the name differs. Non-US citizens are also covered by FDIC insurance as long as their deposits are in a domestic office of an FDIC-insured bank.

The FDIC publishes a guide which sets forth the general characteristics of FDIC deposit insurance, and addresses common questions asked by bank customers about deposit insurance.

=== Items not insured ===
Only the above types of accounts are insured. Some types of uninsured products, even if purchased through a covered financial institution, are:

- Stocks, bonds, and mutual funds including money funds
  - The Securities Investor Protection Corporation, a separate institution chartered by Congress, provides protection against the loss of many types of such securities in the event of a brokerage failure, but not against a decrease in their values.
  - Exceptions have occurred, such as the FDIC bailout of bondholders of Continental Illinois.
- Investments backed by the U.S. government, such as Treasury securities
- The contents of safe deposit boxes.
  Even though the word deposit appears in the name, under federal law a safe deposit box is not a deposit account – it is merely a secured storage space rented by an institution to a customer.
- Insurance and annuity products, such as life, auto and homeowner's insurance.

Deposit accounts are insured only against the failure of a member bank. Deposit losses that occur in the course of the bank's business, such as theft, fraud or accounting errors, must be addressed through the bank or state or federal law.

Deposit insurance also does not cover the failure of non-bank entities that use a bank to offer financial services, e.g. fintech financial technology companies. If the company places the money in an FDIC-insured bank account consumers are protected only under some conditions.

=== Ownership categories ===
Each ownership category of a depositor's money is insured separately up to the insurance limit, and separately at each bank. Thus a depositor with $250,000 in each of three ownership categories at each of two banks would have six different insurance limits of $250,000, for total insurance coverage of $1,500,000. The distinct ownership categories are:

- Single accounts (accounts not falling into any other category)
- Certain retirement accounts (including Individual Retirement Accounts (IRAs))
- Joint accounts (accounts with more than one owner with equal rights to withdraw)
- Revocable and irrevocable trust accounts (containing the words like "In trust for", etc.)
- Employee Benefit Plan accounts (deposits of a pension plan)
- Corporation/partnership/unincorporated association accounts
- Government accounts

All amounts that a particular depositor has in one or more accounts within a single particular ownership category at a single particular bank are added together and are insured up to $250,000.

For joint accounts, each co-owner is assumed (unless the account specifically states otherwise) to own the same fraction of the account as does each other co-owner (even though each co-owner may be eligible to withdraw all funds from the account). Thus if three people jointly own a $750,000 account, the entire account balance is insured because each depositor's $250,000 share of the account is insured.

The owner of a revocable trust account is generally insured up to $250,000 for each unique beneficiary (subject to special rules if there are more than five of them). Thus if there is a single owner of an account that is specified as in trust for three different beneficiaries, the funds in the account are insured up to $750,000.

On January 21, 2022, the Board of Directors passed a Final Rule to simplify the Ownership Categories by combining Revocable and Irrevocable Trusts into a single ownership category. The policy came into effect on April 4, 2022.

On April 1, 2024, the Board of Directors changed how accounts held under the same name would be insured.

== Funds ==
The FDIC receives no funding from the federal budget. Instead it assesses premiums on each member and accumulates them in a Deposit Insurance Fund (DIF) that it uses to pay its operating costs and the depositors of failed banks. The amount of each bank's premiums is based on its balance of insured deposits and the degree of risk that it poses to the FDIC.

Funds in the Deposit Insurance Fund that are not otherwise employed must be invested in obligations of the United States or in obligations guaranteed as to principal and interest by the United States. Under the Dodd–Frank Wall Street Reform and Consumer Protection Act of 2010, the FDIC is required to fund the DIF to at least 1.35% of all insured deposits; in 2020, the amount of insured deposits was approximately $8.9 trillion and therefore the fund requirement was $120 billion.

During two banking crises—the savings and loan crisis and the 2008 financial crisis—the FDIC expended its entire insurance fund. On these occasions it met insurance obligations directly from operating cash, or by borrowing through the Federal Financing Bank. Another option, which it has never used, is a direct line of credit with the Treasury on which it can borrow up to $100 billion.

Between 1989 and 2006, there were two separate FDIC reserve funds: the Bank Insurance Fund (BIF), and the Savings Association Insurance Fund (SAIF). This division reflected the FDIC's assumption of responsibility for insuring savings and loan associations after another federal insurer, the Federal Savings and Loan Insurance Corporation (FSLIC), was unable to recover from the savings and loan crisis. The existence of two separate funds for the same purpose led banks to shift business from one to the other, depending on the benefits each could provide. In the 1990s, SAIF premiums were, at one point, five times higher than BIF premiums; several banks attempted to qualify for the BIF, with some merging with institutions qualified for the BIF to avoid the higher premiums of the SAIF. This drove up the BIF premiums as well, resulting in a situation where both funds were charging higher premiums than necessary.

Then-Chair of the Federal Reserve Alan Greenspan was a critic of the system, saying, "We are, in effect, attempting to use government to enforce two different prices for the same item – namely, government-mandated deposit insurance. Such price differences only create efforts by market participants to arbitrage the difference." Greenspan proposed "to end this game and merge SAIF and BIF". In February 2006, President George W. Bush signed into law the Federal Deposit Insurance Reform Act (FDIRA). Among other purposes, the act merged the BIF and SAIF into a single fund.

At June 30, 2026, the Deposit Insurance Fund had a balance of $161.1 billion and a reserve ratio of 1.48 percent, up from $157.4 billion and 1.43 percent at March 31, 2026. The year-end balance had increased every year from 2009 through 2022.

== Resolution of insolvent banks ==
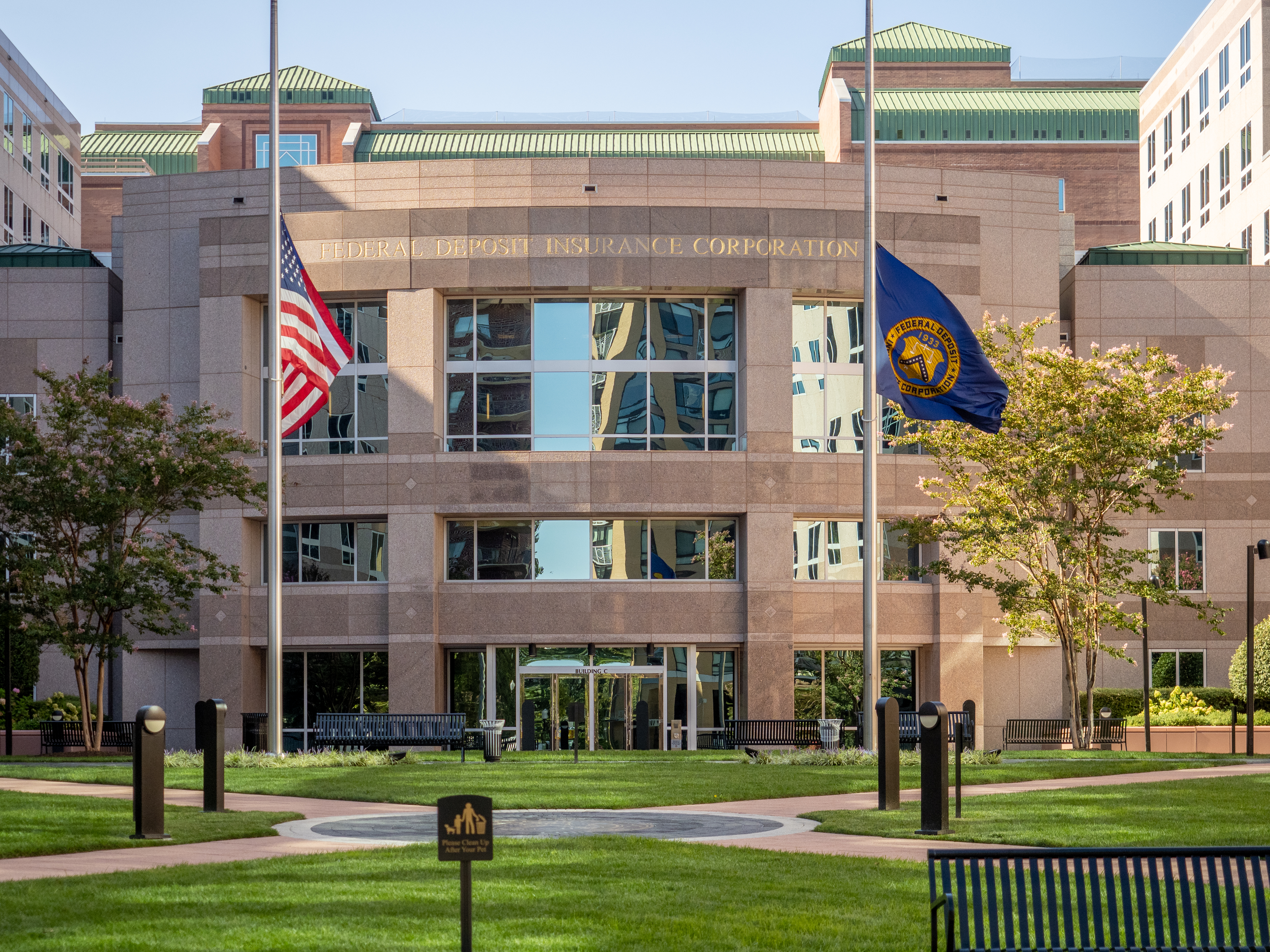
The FDIC's satellite campus in Arlington County, Virginia, is home to many administrative and support functions, though the most senior officials work at the main building in Washington.

Upon a determination that a bank is insolvent, its chartering authority—either a state banking department or the U.S. Office of the Comptroller of the Currency—closes it and appoints the FDIC as receiver. In its role as a receiver the FDIC is tasked with protecting the depositors and maximizing the recoveries for the creditors of the failed institution. The FDIC as receiver is functionally and legally separate from the FDIC acting in its corporate role as deposit insurer. Courts have long recognized these dual and separate capacities as having distinct rights, duties and obligations.

The goals of receivership are to market the assets of a failed institution, liquidate them, and distribute the proceeds to the institution's creditors. The FDIC as receiver succeeds to the rights, powers, and privileges of the institution and its stockholders, officers, and directors. It may collect all obligations and money due to the institution, preserve or liquidate its assets and property, and perform any other function of the institution consistent with its appointment. It also has the power to merge a failed institution with another insured depository institution and to transfer its assets and liabilities without the consent or approval of any other agency, court, or party with contractual rights. It may form a new institution, such as a bridge bank, to take over the assets and liabilities of the failed institution, or it may sell or pledge the assets of the failed institution to the FDIC in its corporate capacity.

The two most common ways for the FDIC to resolve a closed institution and fulfill its role as a receiver are:

- Purchase and assumption agreement (P&A), in which deposits (liabilities) are assumed by an open bank, which also purchases some or all of the failed bank's loans (assets). The bank's assets that convey to the FDIC as receiver are sold and auctioned through various methods, including online, and using contractors.
- Deposit payoff: As soon as the appropriate chartering authority closes the bank or thrift, the FDIC is appointed receiver. The FDIC as insurer pays all of the failed institution's depositors with insured funds the full amount of their insured deposits. Depositors with uninsured funds and other general creditors (such as suppliers and service providers) of the failed institution do not receive either immediate or full reimbursement; instead, the FDIC as receiver issues them receivership certificates. A receivership certificate entitles its holder to a portion of the receiver's collections on the failed institution's assets.

Originally the only resolution method was to establish a temporary deposit insurance national bank that assumed the failed bank's deposits on behalf of the FDIC. This method fell into disuse after the law was revised in 1935 to allow the other options above, although it has been used occasionally when the FDIC determines that it is the most practical way to continue banking service to the failed bank's community.

In 1991, to comply with legislation, the FDIC amended its failure resolution procedures to decrease the costs to the deposit insurance funds. The procedures require the FDIC to choose the resolution alternative that is least costly to the deposit insurance fund of all possible methods for resolving the failed institution. Bids are submitted to the FDIC where they are reviewed and the least cost determination is made.

=== Resolution plans ===
To assist the FDIC in resolving an insolvent bank, covered institutions are required to submit a resolution plan which can be activated if necessary. In addition to the Bank Holding Company ("BHC") resolution plans required under the Dodd Frank Act under Section 165(d), the FDIC requires a separate Covered Insured Depository Institution ("CIDI") resolution plan for US insured depositories with assets of $50 billion or more. Most of the largest, most complex BHCs are subject to both rules, requiring them to file a 165(d) resolution plan for the BHC that includes the BHC's core businesses and its most significant subsidiaries (i.e., "material entities"), as well as one or more CIDI plans depending on the number of US bank subsidiaries of the BHC that meet the $50 billion asset threshold.

On December 17, 2014, the FDIC issued guidance for the 2015 resolution plans of CIDIs of large bank holding companies (BHCs). The guidance provides clarity on the assumptions that are to be made in the CIDI resolution plans and what must be addressed and analyzed in the 2015 CIDI resolution plans including:

- The assumption that the CIDI must fail.
- The cause of CIDI failure must be a core business loss or impairment.
- At least one "multiple acquirer strategy" is required in the plan.
- A deep level of granularity is expected in the plan.
- Sales strategies must be feasible and supported by considerable acquirer detail.
- A detailed financial and liquidity analysis is needed.
- Key legal issues must be considered.
- Resolution obstacles must be addressed.
- The CIDI must be insolvent at the start of resolution.

== Board of directors ==
The board of directors is the governing body of the FDIC. The board is composed of five members, three appointed by the president of the United States with the consent of the United States Senate and two ex officio members. The three appointed members each serve six-year terms. These may continue to serve after the expiration of their terms of office until a successor has taken office. No more than three members of the board may be of the same political affiliation.

The president, with the consent of the Senate, also designates one of the appointed members as chairman of the board, to serve a five-year term and one of the appointed members as vice chairman of the board. The two ex officio members are the Comptroller of the Currency and the director of the Consumer Financial Protection Bureau (CFPB).

=== Current board members ===
The current board members as of August 1, 2026:

Position	Name	Party	Assumed office	Term expiration
Chairman	Travis Hill	Republican	January 5, 2023	December 21, 2028
Member Comptroller of the Currency (ex officio)	Jonathan Gould	Republican	July 15, 2025	July 15, 2030
Member Director, CFPB (ex officio)	Mark Paoletta (acting)	Republican	August 1, 2026	—
Member	Vacant	—N/a	—	December 21, 2028
Member	Vacant	—N/a	—	May 31, 2030

== History ==
=== Panics of 1893 and 1907 and the Great Depression: 1893–1933 ===
Without deposit insurance, bank depositors took the risk that their bank could run out of cash due to losses on its loans or an unexpected surge in withdrawals, leaving them with few options to recover their money. The failure of one bank might shift losses and withdrawal demands to others and spread into a panic. During the Panics of 1893 and 1907, many banks (Note: Around 491 commercial banks failed in 1893, and 243 between 1907 and 1908.) filed bankruptcy due to bank runs. Both of the panics renewed discussion on deposit insurance. In 1893, William Jennings Bryan presented a bill to Congress proposing a national deposit insurance fund. No action was taken, as the legislature paid more attention to the agricultural depression at the time.

After 1907, eight states established deposit insurance funds. Due to the lax regulation of banks and the widespread inability of banks to branch, small, local unit banks—often with poor financial health—grew in numbers, especially in the western and southern states. In 1921, there were about 31,000 banks in the US. The Federal Reserve Act initially included a provision for nationwide deposit insurance, but it was removed from the bill by the House of Representatives. From 1893 to the FDIC's creation in 1933, 150 bills were submitted in Congress proposing deposit insurance.

The problem of bank instability was already apparent before the onset of the Great Depression. From 1921 to 1929, approximately 5,700 bank failures occurred, concentrated in rural areas. Nearly 10,000 failures occurred from 1929 to 1933, or more than one-third of all U.S. banks. A panic in February 1933 spread so rapidly that most state governments ordered the closure of all banks.

=== Establishment of the FDIC: 1933 ===
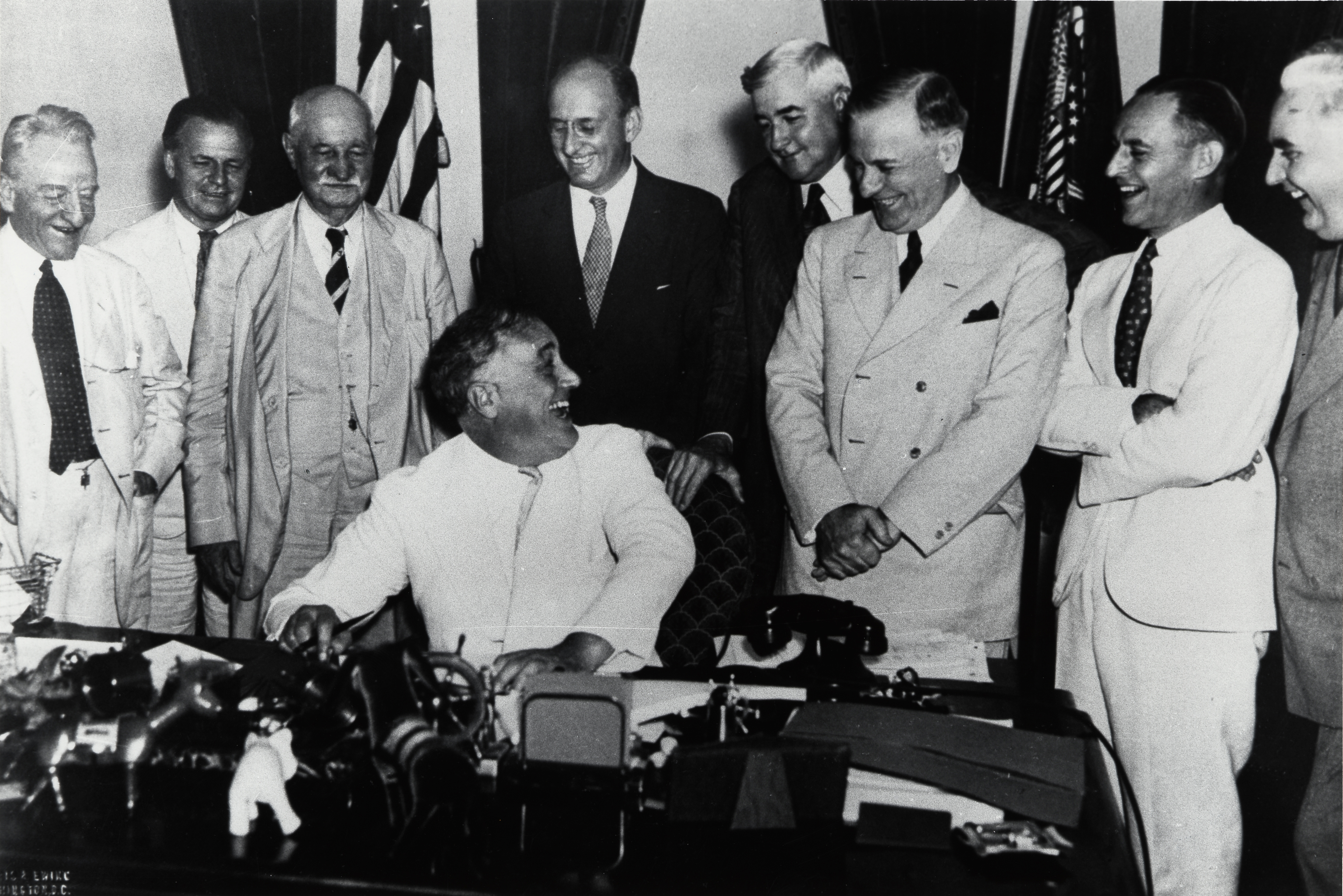
President Franklin Delano Roosevelt signs the Banking Act of 1933.

President Franklin D. Roosevelt himself was dubious about insuring bank deposits, saying, "We do not wish to make the United States Government liable for the mistakes and errors of individual banks, and put a premium on unsound banking in the future." Bankers likewise opposed insurance, arguing that it would create a moral hazard for bankers and depositors, and even denounced it as socialist. Yet public support was overwhelmingly in favor. On June 16, 1933, Roosevelt signed the 1933 Banking Act into law, creating the FDIC. The initial plan set by Congress in 1934 was to insure deposits up to $2,500 ($60,168 today) and adoption of a more generous, long-term plan after six months. (Note: The latter plan was to insure all deposits up to $10,000 ($240,672), 75 percent of all deposits over $10,000 to $50,000 ($1,203,358), and 50 percent of anything over $50,000. Brackets indicate amount taking into account consumer price inflation from 1934.) However, the latter plan was abandoned for an increase of the insurance limit to $5,000 (equivalent to $120,336 in 2025).

The 1933 Banking Act:

- Established the FDIC as a temporary government corporation.
- Gave the FDIC authority to provide deposit insurance to banks
- Gave the FDIC the authority to regulate and supervise state non-member banks
- Funded the FDIC with loans in the form of stock contributions from the Treasury and the Federal Reserve Banks
- Extended federal oversight to all commercial banks for the first time
- Separated commercial and investment banking (Glass–Steagall Act)
- Prohibited banks from paying interest on checking accounts
- Allowed national banks to branch statewide, if allowed by state law.

The Banking Act of 1935 made the FDIC a permanent agency of the government and provided permanent deposit insurance maintained at the $5,000 level.

=== Historical insurance limits ===
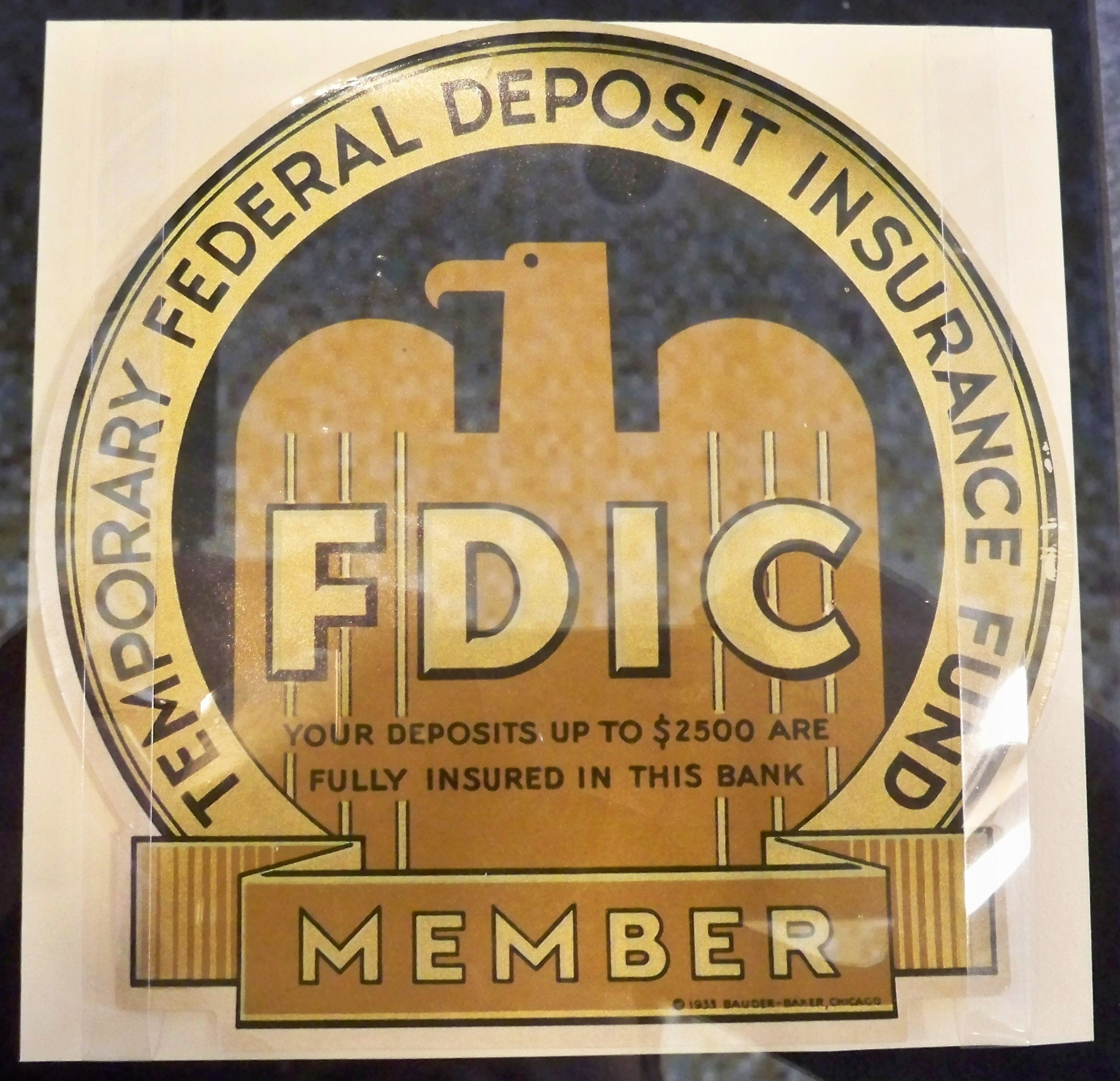
Bank sign indicating the original insurance limit offered by the FDIC of $2,500 in 1934

The per-depositor insurance limit has increased over time to accommodate inflation.

- 1934: $2,500
- 1935: $5,000
- 1950: $10,000
- 1966: $15,000
- 1969: $20,000
- 1974: $40,000
- 1980: $100,000
- 2008: $250,000

Congress approved a temporary increase in the deposit insurance limit from $100,000 to $250,000, which was effective from October 3, 2008, through December 31, 2010. On May 20, 2009, the temporary increase was extended through December 31, 2013. The Dodd–Frank Wall Street Reform and Consumer Protection Act (P.L.111-203), which was signed into law on July 21, 2010, made the $250,000 insurance limit permanent, and extended the guarantee retroactively to January 1, 2008, meaning it covered uninsured deposits banks like IndyMac. In addition, the Federal Deposit Insurance Reform Act of 2005 (P.L.109-171) allows for the boards of the FDIC and the National Credit Union Administration (NCUA) to consider inflation and other factors every five years beginning in 2010 and, if warranted, to adjust the amounts under a specified formula.

FDIC-insured institutions are permitted to display a sign stating the terms of its insurance—that is, the per-depositor limit and the guarantee of the United States government. The FDIC describes this sign as a symbol of confidence for depositors. As part of a 1987 legislative enactment, Congress passed a measure stating "it is the sense of the Congress that it should reaffirm that deposits up to the statutorily prescribed amount in federally insured depository institutions are backed by the full faith and credit of the United States", and similar language is used in 12 U.S.C. § 1825(d), a 1989 amendment to the Federal Deposit Insurance Act.

=== S&L and bank crisis of the 1980s ===
Federal deposit insurance received its first large-scale test since the Great Depression in the late 1980s and early 1990s during the savings and loan crisis (which also affected commercial banks and savings banks).

The Federal Savings and Loan Insurance Corporation (FSLIC) had been created to insure deposits held by savings and loan institutions ("S&Ls", or "thrifts"). Because of a confluence of events, much of the S&L industry was insolvent, and many large banks were in trouble as well. FSLIC's reserves were insufficient to pay off the depositors of all of the failing thrifts, and fell into insolvency. FSLIC was abolished in August 1989 and replaced by the Resolution Trust Corporation (RTC). On December 31, 1995, the RTC was merged into the FDIC, and the FDIC became responsible for resolving failed thrifts. Supervision of thrifts became the responsibility of a new agency, the Office of Thrift Supervision (credit unions remained insured by the National Credit Union Administration). The primary legislative responses to the crisis were the Financial Institutions Reform, Recovery and Enforcement Act of 1989 (FIRREA), and the Federal Deposit Insurance Corporation Improvement Act of 1991 (FDICIA). Federally chartered thrifts are now regulated by the Office of the Comptroller of the Currency (OCC), and state-chartered thrifts by the FDIC.

The final combined total for all direct and indirect losses of FSLIC and RTC resolutions was an estimated $152.9 billion. Of this total amount, U.S. taxpayer losses amounted to approximately $123.8 billion (81% of the total costs).

When the FDIC's Bank Insurance Fund was exhausted in 1990, it received authority from Congress to borrow through the Federal Financing Bank (FFB). Using this facility, the FDIC borrowed $15 billion to strengthen the fund, and repaid the debt by 1993.

=== 2008 financial crisis ===
The FDIC faced its greatest challenge from the 2008 financial crisis. From 2008 to 2017 a total of 528 member institutions failed, with the annual number peaking at 157 in 2010. These included the largest failure to date, Washington Mutual, and the sixth largest, IndyMac. Wachovia, another large bank, avoided failure through last-minute merger arrangements at the FDIC's insistence. At the height of the crisis in late 2008, Treasury secretary Henry Paulson and Federal Reserve officials Ben Bernanke and Timothy Geithner proposed that the FDIC should guarantee debts across the US financial sector, including investment banks. Chairman Sheila Bair resisted, and after negotiations the FDIC instead announced a Temporary Liquidity Guarantee Program that guaranteed deposits and unsecured debt instruments used for day-to-day payments. To promote depositor confidence, Congress temporarily raised the insurance limit to $250,000.

Although most failures were resolved through merger or acquisition, the FDIC's insurance fund was exhausted by late 2009. The largest FDIC payout for that year was for the failure of Florida-based BankUnited FSB, which cost the fund $5.6 billion out of $17 billion at the start of the year. Rather than borrowing from the FFB or the Treasury, the FDIC demanded three years of advance premiums from its member institutions and operated the fund with a negative net balance.

The Dodd–Frank Act of 2010 created new authorities for the FDIC to address risks associated with systemically important financial institutions. These institutions were required to submit resolution plans, or "living wills," which the FDIC would execute in the event of their failure. A new division, the Office of Complex Financial Institutions, was created to administer these responsibilities. The act also made the insurance limit increase permanent and required the FDIC to submit a restoration plan whenever the insurance fund balance falls below 1.35% of insured deposits. The insurance fund returned to a positive balance at the start of 2011 and reached its required balance in 2018. That year also saw no bank failures for the first time since the crisis.

== List of chairs ==
Since 1933, the following persons have served as the FDIC chair:

No.	Portrait	Chairpersons	Term started	Term ended	Notes
1		Walter J. Cummings	September 11, 1933	February 1, 1934	
2		Leo Crowley	February 1, 1934	October 15, 1945	
Acting		Preston Delano	October 15, 1945	January 5, 1946	
3		Maple T. Harl	January 5, 1946	May 10, 1953	
4		Henry E. Cook	May 10, 1953	September 6, 1957	
Acting		Ray M. Gidney	September 6, 1957	September 17, 1957	
5		Jesse P. Wolcott	September 17, 1957	January 20, 1961	
6		Erle Cocke Sr.	January 20, 1961	August 4, 1963	
Acting		James J. Saxon	August 4, 1963	January 22, 1964	
7		Joseph W. Barr	January 22, 1964	April 21, 1965	
8		Kenneth A. Randall	April 21, 1965	March 9, 1970	
Acting		William B. Camp	March 9, 1970	April 1, 1970	
9		Frank Wille	April 1, 1970	March 16, 1976	
Acting		James Smith	March 16, 1976	March 18, 1976	
10		Robert E. Barnett	March 18, 1976	June 1, 1977	
11		George A. LeMaistre	June 1, 1977	August 16, 1978	
Acting		John G. Heimann	August 16, 1978	February 7, 1979	
12		Irvine H. Sprague	February 7, 1979	August 2, 1981	
13		William Isaac	August 3, 1981	October 21, 1985	
14		L. William Seidman	October 21, 1985	October 16, 1991	
Acting		Andrew C. Hove Jr.	October 17, 1991	October 25, 1991	
15		William Taylor	October 25, 1991	August 20, 1992	
Acting		Andrew C. Hove Jr.	August 20, 1992	October 7, 1994	
16		Ricki R. Tigert	October 7, 1994	June 1, 1997	
Acting		Andrew C. Hove Jr.	June 1, 1997	May 25, 1998	
17		Donna Tanoue	May 26, 1998	July 11, 2001	
Acting		John N. Reich	July 12, 2001	August 29, 2001	
18		Donald E. Powell	August 29, 2001	November 15, 2005	
Acting		Martin J. Gruenberg	November 16, 2005	June 26, 2006	
19		Sheila Bair	June 26, 2006	July 8, 2011	
Acting		Martin J. Gruenberg	July 9, 2011	November 28, 2012	
20		Martin J. Gruenberg	November 29, 2012	June 5, 2018	
21		Jelena McWilliams	June 5, 2018	February 4, 2022	
Acting		Martin J. Gruenberg	February 5, 2022	January 5, 2023	
22		Martin J. Gruenberg	January 5, 2023	January 19, 2025	
Acting		Travis Hill	January 20, 2025	January 13, 2026	
23		Travis Hill	January 13, 2026	Present	

== See also ==
- 1933 Banking Act
- Call report
- FDIC problem bank list
- Federal Deposit Insurance Reform Act of 2005
- Fractional-reserve banking
- List of bank failures in the United States (2008–present)
- List of largest bank failures in the United States
- List of financial supervisory authorities by country
- Title 12 of the Code of Federal Regulations

=== Related agencies and programs ===
- CAMELS rating system—developed by the FDIC's Division of Risk Management Supervision (RMS) to rate each U.S. bank and credit union
- Canada Deposit Insurance Corporation—Canadian counterpart to FDIC
- Depositors Insurance Fund—The inspiration for the formation of the FDIC
- Financial Services Compensation Scheme—the United Kingdom's equivalent to FDIC
- National Credit Union Share Insurance Fund—NCUA counterpart to FDIC
