= Stanley Hallett =

Stanley James Hallett
- Born: October 6, 1930; New Hampton, Iowa, U.S.
- Died: November 24, 1998 (aged 68); Chicago, Illinois, U.S.
- Education: Dakota Wesleyan University; Boston University; Harvard University; Garrett-Evangelical Theological Seminary
- Organization(s): Center for Neighborhood Technology; ShoreBank; Northwestern University Institute for Policy Research; North Park University; Metra; Woodstock Institute
- Movement: Civil rights movement

Stanley James Hallett (October 6, 1930 – November 24, 1998) was an American urban planner and specialist in urban community development who helped seed numerous initiatives and organizations throughout his career. With the bulk of his professional work taking place in Chicago, Hallett began by working in church civil rights and later turned increasingly to community economic and environmental sustainability. He and colleagues created Chicago's Center for Neighborhood Technology(CNT), South Shore Bank (later ShoreBank), Northwestern University's Center for Urban Affairs and Policy Research and other institutions. During his career he worked alongside numerous activists, journalists and religious leaders, including Martin Luther King Jr., Saul Alinsky, George McGovern and Studs Terkel.

One of the key concepts that Hallett add to urban planning was the idea of "economy of neighborhoods"; Scott Bernstein, a Hallett disciple and co-founder of the CNT, told an interviewer: "Most economists don't admit to an economy of cities, let alone neighborhoods. Stan saw neighborhoods as a place where money flows in and out."

== Early life ==
Hallett received his B.A. from Dakota Wesleyan University in 1950. In 1954, he received his Bachelor of Sacred Theology, magna cum laude, from Boston University's School of Theology. He did a photo study on Boston's Roxbury neighborhood and became acquainted with fellow theology student Martin Luther King Jr. Hallett was influenced by Dean Walter George Muelder, whom Hallett felt "...was way before his time on the status of women in the church, and he had a very strong commitment to dealing with questions of race".

== The Chicago years ==
In 1962, Hallett moved to Chicago to take a job as director of research and planning for the Church Federation of Greater Chicago. Church Federation executive director Rev. Edgar Chandler became a mentor; Chandler would later help organize King's Soldier Field rally and would organize a march on the segregated Rainbow Beach, along with Monsignor John Joseph Egan and Rabbi Robert Marx.

At the Urban Training Center for Christian Mission, Hallett taught organizing strategies to civil-rights activists heading south, as he had noticed:

There's a tendency in a movement to go with the flow and respond to problems – we were trying to think ahead... When you start asking where do you want to be in a year and a half, what are the steps to get there, and what is everyone's role in making that happen, it builds in a discipline that's not externally imposed but that's in the nature of the work.

In 1963, Hallett received his Ph.D. from Boston University. His dissertation was entitled "Ethical Issues in Urban Planning and Development." He spent that summer in the south, at the invitation of Ed King. Hallett says, "I had another friend from Boston, Ed King, who was a pastor at Tougaloo College in Mississippi. ...Ed told me 16 civil rights workers had been killed—this was the summer of '63—and he felt the news wasn't being reported. ...I said, 'What can I do?' He said, 'The most important thing is for you to come down here. We have to get outside credible sources in here to get the news out.' I went down and spent a week in Mississippi with Ed. When I came back, I reported it to a meeting of the Church Federation of Greater Chicago. I gave probably the best speech of my life. And then we began to organize a delegation of clergy to go there from northern cities with the purpose of keeping down the violence. The clergy would come back to Detroit or Baltimore, and then there would be an article in the local papers from somebody they trusted. One after another the major metropolitan dailies started to report what was going on. Nicholas von Hoffman was a reporter for the Chicago Daily News. When we were working on desegregating churches in Mississippi, I would talk to Nick every night. Nick would suggest what to do next because he knew what would make the news. And we'd act it out. He was the only reporter I knew who'd help make the news so he could write about it." That year Hallett also worked as a consultant to developer Jim Rouse on the planning and development of Columbia, Maryland.

In 1965, Hallett worked to bring clergy from Chicago and other northern cities to the call of the Civil Rights Movement. He and other "bishops, rabbis, ministers, priests and nuns felt the call to march in Alabama with Martin Luther King." Hallett was quoted in the Time Magazine article of Friday, April 9, 1965, entitled Churches: The Selma Spirit—"It was a breakthrough into a whole new spirit," he says, "a sense of being part of a community at a level and depth that we've never known before."

In 1971, Al Raby, who headed the Coordinating Council of Community Organizations, introduced Hallett to Ron Grzywinski, Milton Davis and Mary Houghton, who would together establish the South Shore Bank's community banking program. He served as a Founding Board Member for the ShoreBank Corporation from 1973 to 1975, and was vice-president of South Shore's holding company in its critical first five years.

In 1976, Hallett was co-founder, along with Scott Bernstein and Dr. John Martin, of the Center for Neighborhood Technology. CNT grew from a project at the Center for Urban Affairs examining appropriate technology for city neighborhoods, initially looking at food production, solar energy and conservation. ("A lot of environmental groups are good at saying, 'Stop, don't do this.' But the question of what we should be doing instead requires that you really take a look at technological development." He served as a Board Member until his death in 1998.

That same year, Hallett joined five colleagues to launch the Chicago-based Woodstock Institute (originally in hearby Woodstock, Illinois), serving as a Founding Board Member until his death in 1998.

In 1985, Hallett and his brother Tom launched Pathfinder Systems, Inc., a personal rapid transit system, to free cities from the enormous toll of the automobile. The concept for Pathfinder would become a consuming, lifelong interest, stating:

It's clear to me that the automobile is a terribly polluting destructive machine. It is impossible to keep going like this – even the electric cars, the hypercars, are too polluting... Can you imagine what this city would be like if we could convert some of these streets into gardens and tennis courts?

In 1987, Hallett and John L. McKnight co-chaired the Chicago Innovations Forum, providing forums for discussion of evolving urban issues.

Hallett died on November 24, 1998.

== See also ==
- Asset-Based Community Development
- Community development
- Sustainable development
