= Joseph E. Hasten =

- Born: February 25, 1952; Chicago, IL
- Died: November 1, 2011 (aged 59); Chicago, IL
- Education: Fairfield, B.A. Northwestern, M.B.A.
- Occupation: Business Executive
- Employer: ShoreBank
- Title: Chief Executive Officer

Joseph E. Hasten (February 25, 1952 – November 1, 2011) was the president and CEO of ShoreBank, America's first and leading community development and environmental bank founded in 1973 in Chicago, Illinois and named one of Fast Company's 45 Social Entrepreneurs Who Are Changing the World in 2008. Hasten led ShoreBank's socially responsible investing in the under-served urban neighborhoods of Chicago, Illinois; Cleveland, Ohio; and Detroit, Michigan. Previously, Hasten was the vice-chairman of U.S. Bancorp.

== Career ==
=== ShoreBank ===
Hasten joined ShoreBank as CEO in May 2007. Soon after, Hasten and ShoreBank mounted an effort to offer mortgage refinancing to many of the 10,000 South Side, Chicago homeowners identified by ShoreBank as being at risk of losing their homes to foreclosure. Named the Rescue Loan Program, ShoreBanks efforts were at the forefront of the subprime mortgage crisis and became a model for helping homeowners at the highest risk of default due to predatory loans by offering them a chance to refinance into fixed mortgages at reasonable rates. The program attracted national attention and was profiled on The News Hour with Jim Lehrer and the Nightly Business Report on PBS. And Fast Company and the Monitor Group awarded a 2007 Social Capitalist Award and named ShoreBank one of 45 Social Entrepreneurs Who Are Changing the World in 2008. Hasten was replaced by George Surgeon as CEO in November 2009

=== Pre-ShoreBank ===
Hasten began his banking career in the training program at the former American National Bank in 1975. From 1984 to 1991, Hasten ran the Midwest United States operations of the Standard Chartered Bank, and from 1991 to 1995, was the CEO of the bank's South Korean and Indonesian operations. Hasten joined the former Mercantile Bancorporation in 1995 as president of the St. Louis, Missouri bank, its lead bank, and of corporate banking system-wide. He became vice chairman in 1999 for all wholesale banking when the former Firstar Corporation took over Mercantile, and assumed control of corporate banking with U.S. Bank after it merged with the Firstar in February 2001. He served as vice-chairman of U.S. Bancorp until August 2005.

== Education ==
Hasten received his B.A. in 1974 from Fairfield University in Fairfield, Connecticut and M.B.A. in 1978 from the Kellogg School of Management at Northwestern University in Chicago, Illinois.

== Death ==
Hasten died of pancreatic cancer on November 1, 2011. In honor of his memory, his family has started the JEH Foundation for Pancreatic Cancer Research.
