= CFSI =

CFSI, CfSi or cfsi may refer to:

- Community and Family Services International
- Counterfeit, fraudulent, and suspect items
- Culver's Franchising System, Inc., a fast-casual restaurant chain, headquartered in Prairie du Sac, Wisconsin.
- The Center for Financial Services Innovation, a non-profit think tank serving the underbanked, headquartered in Chicago, Illinois
- The Children's Film Society of India, an Indian governmental organisation
