= Capital Impact Partners =

Nonprofit organization centered on financial institutions

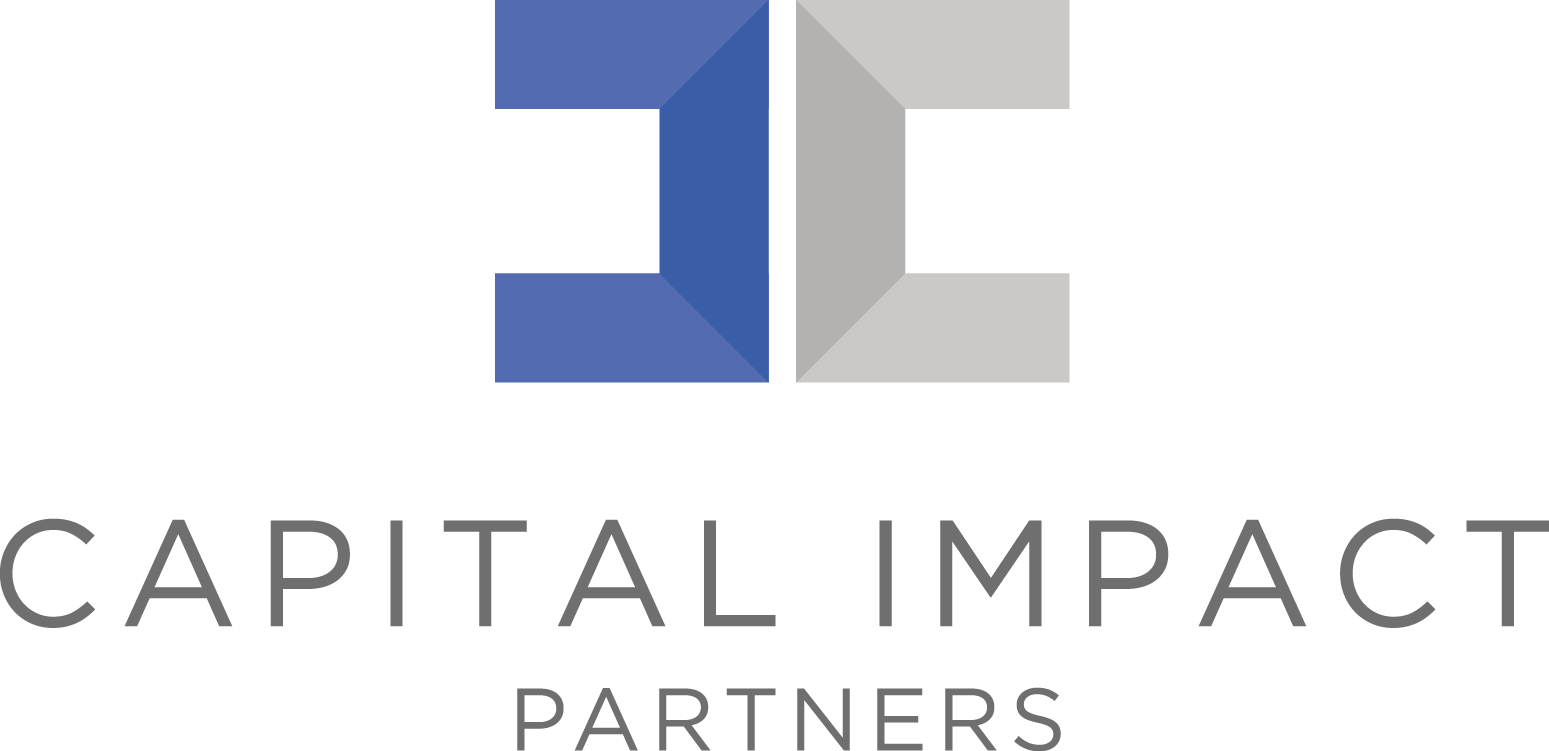
- Founded: 1982; 44 years ago
- Type: Non-Profit Community development financial institution
- Location(s): Arlington, VA; Oakland, CA; Detroit, MI; New York, NY
- Region served: United States
- Method: Loans, Grants, Investments
- Revenue: $23,898,985 (2017)
- Expenses: $28,568,582 (2017)
- Website: www.capitalimpact.org

Capital Impact Partners, or simply Capital Impact, is an American congressionally chartered, District of Columbia nonprofit and certified community development financial institution that provides credit and financial services to underserved markets and populations in the United States. S&P Global issued Capital Impact its first rating in 2017.

Capital Impact was created in 1982 as the nonprofit arm of the National Cooperative Bank as part of the National Consumer Cooperative Bank Act. Capital Impact became independently certified as its own financial institution by the U.S. Department of the Treasury's Community Development Financial Institutions Fund in 2011. The company's president and CEO is Ellis Carr, the chief lending officer is Diane Borradaile, the chief financial officer is Natalie Gunn, and Amy Sue Leavens is the chief legal counsel. From 1994 until 2016, Terry Simonette served as president and CEO of Capital Impact until Ellis Carr was named as his replacement.

The company is among the largest community development financial institutions in the country. As of 2015, they invested over $2 billion into senior care, affordable housing, health care, education and public nutrition projects in distressed and low-income communities across the country. These investments include the creation of over 9,000 units of affordable assisted living; more than 35,000 units of affordable housing; 3 million square feet of health center space providing more than 1 million patient visits annually; $500 million for developing charter schools creating more than 200,000 seats for children; and healthy food retail in over 60 locations. Capital Impact has created around 31,000 new jobs for low-income individuals. In 2015, Capital Impact became a member of the Federal Home Loan Bank of Atlanta. Capital Impact has been recognized for its social impact, financial ratings and policies by Aeris, a company that rates community development financial institutions, each year since Aeris was established in 2007. In October 2016, Capital Impact received two allocations from the Treasury Department's Community Development Financial Institution Fund, including a $2 million financial assistance award.

== Projects ==
Capital Impact provides financing to individuals, organizations and companies in order to build new businesses or expand existing facilities that increase access to services for populations made up primarily of low to moderate income residents.

=== Cooperative development ===
With its origins in the 1978 National Consumer Cooperative Bank Act, Capital Impact continues with the economic advancement of cooperatives as one of its initiatives. They partner with the National Cooperative Grocers Association to provide underwriting and loan administration services to food co-ops across the country. In 2015, Capital Impact awarded $40,000 to the Democracy at Work Institute and the United States Federation of Worker Cooperatives through its first Co-op Innovation Award. Since its founding, Capital Impact has deployed $278 million in capital across 208 cooperatives.

=== Affordable housing ===
Capital Impact Partners launched the Cornerstone Partnership, which helps shared-equity housing programs grow and share best practices. They also invested in the cooperative business ROC USA. The organization helps owners of manufactured homes to work together to purchase their land.

In 2011, Capital Impact received a $2 million grant from the Social Innovation Fund, a program of the Corporation for National and Community Service. Capital Impact used the grant to replicate shared equity homeownership programs that enable new homebuyers to partner with a government or nonprofit agency acting as a co-investor, providing the homebuyer with public funds to reduce costs. In return, homebuyers agree to share their equity appreciation to preserve affordability and return funds to the initial public investment. In October 2015, a piece in the Dallas Observer featured Capital Impact's "Inclusionary Calculator" to help cities address affordable housing zoning issues. In 2016, Capital Impact was awarded $4.8 million from the Community Development Financial Institution Fund's Capital Magnet Fund, which is given to aid low-income families and economically distressed communities.

As part of its projects in Detroit, Michigan, Capital Impact financed Diamond Place, an apartment complex in Grand Rapids, which contained approximately 100 units for income-restricted residents.

In March 2017, Capital Impact released a study focused on low-income residents and included advice for policy makers and developers to avoid displacement and relocation of residents in revitalized cities.

=== Education ===
As of December 31, 2013, Capital Impact had disbursed $630.6 million to charter schools, representing 30% of all charter school lending nationwide. Examples of this financing include the Jalen Rose Leadership Academy, Detroit Edison Public School Academy and Henry Ford Academy in Detroit, the El Sol Arts and Science Academy in Los Angeles, Palmetto Charter School in Florida and EdVisions, a teacher-owned cooperative that opened the Minnesota New Country School.

Capital Impact was included in an $8 million grant given to the National Charter School Lending Collaborative which supports high-quality education for low-income families in July 2016. In August 2016, it was announced that Capital Impact had financed $7.3 million in the building of the West Michigan Academy of Environmental Science.

=== Health care ===
After Hurricane Katrina, Capital Impact financed $700,000 for a Tulane University-supported community health center in the New Orleans neighborhood Broadmoor. The center serves 1,300 patients annually and created more than 200 permanent jobs in the community. In 2013, Capital Impact financed a 10-year, $5 million loan to the Sonoma Valley Community Health Center. Capital Impact is an investor in the Brockton Neighborhood Health Center, which is the town's largest employer. In October 2015, Capital Impact financed a $3.8 million expansion for a Native American Health Clinic in Sacramento.

Capital Impact established its Healthier California Fund to assist community health centers and clinics to meet Affordable Care Act requirements in March 2016 with $20 million. In July 2016, it funded $1 million of the renovation of Tri-City Health Center's Irvington Dave Clinic in Fremont, California through that fund. That same year, Capital Impact gave a $1 million loan to Ole Health through its California Primary Care Association Ventures Program. Capital Impact also funded Axis Community Health's new Pleasanton health center in September 2016.

=== Healthy food ===
Capital Impact administered The California FreshWorks Fund, a $272 million loan fund designed to finance inner-city grocery retailers and increase access to healthy foods and alleviate food deserts in those areas. First Lady Michelle Obama announced the loan fund at a ceremony in 2011.

Capital Impact also manages the Michigan Good Food Fund, a public-private partnership that increases access to fresh produce and meat in under-served communities while also expanding business opportunities for entrepreneurs in the food and agriculture sector through loans and grants. In November 2016, the Fund launched the Catalytic Investment Awards program to provide healthy food efforts in underserved communities in Michigan with financing and business assistance. By May 2017, the fund had made over $10 million in investments in southeastern Michigan.

In addition to managing the FreshWorks and the Michigan Good Food Fund, Capital Impact provides financial and developmental services to healthy food projects including the Northgate Gonzalez Markets, the Imperial Fresh Market in Detroit, LA Prep in California, and Produce on the Go, a mobile food market in Merced County, California.

In October 2016, Capital Impact received a $2.4 million Healthy Food Financing Initiative award through the 2016 program round of the Treasury Department's Community Development Financial Institution Fund. Capital Impact invested $5.9 million in New Markets Tax Credits to The Commons development at Stanton Square in Washington D.C., which will house the community non-profit Martha's Table, in 2018.

=== Senior care ===
In 2006, Capital Impact received a grant from the Robert Wood Johnson Foundation to help create the Green House Project, an alternative to the traditional nursing home. Capital Impact managed the initiative until it became an independent organization in 2016. Developed by Dr. Bill Thomas, Green House homes provides nursing care to 10 to 12 older adults in a small, home-like setting with the goal of providing more autonomy in decision-making, more self-directed care and more social connections. As of 2015, there are 153 Green House homes on 35 campuses in 25 states across the country including The Harry and Jeanette Weinberg Green House Homes at Mirasol in Loveland, Colorado.

Capital Impact also administered the Village to Village Network, a peer network group that facilitates older adults aging in place based on a model started by Beacon Hill Village, until it became an independent organization in 2015. Villages are community-based membership organizations that provide support through volunteering and resource referrals for older adults so they can age in their own homes and communities.

In 2015, Capital Impact partnered with the AARP Foundation and the Calvert Foundation to establish the Age Strong impact investing program to help older adults remain in their communities as they age. The Age Strong effort identifies and provides financing to projects that help low-income people over 50 secure housing, have access to healthy food and health care, improve their financial situations and remedy common problems associated with isolation. In August 2016, it was announced that Capital Impact gave $3 million in funding from the Age Strong fund toward Keystone Healthcare Development Service's Federally Qualified Health Center in Transfer, Pennsylvania operated by Primary Health Network.

In September 2016, Capital Impact Partners loaned funding to the Mustard Seed Project of Key Peninsula in order to purchase a former restaurant and five acres surrounding it to house the first senior housing on the Key Peninsula. Capital Impact funded the senior housing community Magnolia Crossing in Clovis, California. The community was created to give residents care in a homelike environment with 14 units of the 48 unit community were set aside for seniors on Medi-Cal. It is the first project of its type to earn partial financing by the New Markets Tax Credit Program.

In March 2017, Capital Impact received a $200,000 two year grant from the AARP Foundations' Evidence-based Solutions for Vulnerable Older Adults to support a program designed to expand home care cooperatives and create jobs for women fifty and older.

== Other services ==
Capital Impact also facilitates financing deals that include New Markets Tax Credits and the Bond Guarantee Program awarded by the Department of Treasury through its Community Development Financial Institution Fund to promote access to capital and local economic growth in urban and rural low-income communities across the nation.

In October 2017, the company launched Capital Impact Investment Notes, an impact investing program designed for retail and institutional investors to invest in social impact projects for underserved communities. Investments are processed through InCapital's Legacy Platform.

== Detroit development ==
In 2006, Capital Impact began working intensively within the urban communities of Detroit, Michigan. From 2010 until 2015, Capital Impact partnered with the Living Cities Integration Initiative to bring economic development to Detroit and densify its urban core. As part of its efforts to create affordable housing and mixed-use development in the city, Capital Impact launched the $30-million Woodward Corridor Investment Fund with the Kresge Foundation and the Detroit Neighborhoods Fund with JPMorgan Chase. In addition to new construction and renovation, Capital Impact finances projects that renovate and preserve historic buildings in Midtown Detroit.

Projects benefiting from these investments include the renovation of the Professional Plaza, Rainer Court, Nailah Commons, the Scott at Brush Park, the James Scott House, Woodward Grand, and the Regis Houze which is connected to the Hotel St. Regis. Since 2009, Capital Impact invested more than $100 million in development projects. The company invested in the expansion of Imperial Fresh Market, the renovation of the A. Alfred Taubman Center for Design Education at the College for Creative Studies which holds the Henry Ford Academy Charter School, and the expansion of the Detroit Edison Public School Academy.

In 2013, Capital Impact won the Wells Fargo NEXT Award for Opportunity Finance for their work in education, affordable housing and mixed-use projects in Detroit. In 2016, Capital Impact contributed to the financing for the renovation of the Elliott Building into loft-style apartments with two levels of retail space.

Capital Impact worked with Midtown Detroit Inc., the Kresge Foundation and the Ford Foundation to establish Stay Midtown, a program designed to aid Midtown residents being priced out of their neighborhood. In 2017, Capital Impact founded the Equitable Development Initiative program, designed to help minority real estate developers in Detroit.

== See also ==
- Community development
- Community development financial institution
- Urbanism
- Low-Income Housing Tax Credit
