= Chad Broughton =

American author and sociologist (born 1971)

- Born: February 11, 1971 (age 55); Cincinnati, Ohio, U.S.
- Occupations: Author; sociologist
- Years active: 1997–present
- Spouse: Mona
- Children: 3
- Awards: WOLA-Duke Human Rights Book Award (2016); American Sociological Association (Labor and Labor Movements) (2017)

Academic background
- Education: Indiana University Bloomington (BA); University of Chicago (MA, PhD)

Academic work
- Discipline: Sociology
- Sub-discipline: Urban sociology; Ethnography; Poverty; Social inequality; Transnationalism; Immigration; Labour relations; Public policy
- Institutions: Knox College (2001–2006); University of Chicago (2006–present)
- Notable works: Boom, Bust, Exodus; The Atlantic

Chad Broughton (born February 11, 1971) is an American author and sociologist. He is the author of Boom, Bust, Exodus and contributor to The Atlantic magazine.

Broughton is an American sociologist at the University of Chicago in the Public Policy Studies program in the College. His areas of specialty include ethnography, urban sociology, poverty and inequality, transnationalism and immigration, and labor studies and the sociology of work. Broughton, born in 1971, received his Bachelor of Arts from Indiana University Bloomington in 1993 and his PhD from the University of Chicago in 2001. He taught at Knox College in Galesburg, Illinois, from 2001 to 2006.

== Early life and education ==
Chad Broughton was born in Cincinnati, Ohio, on February 11, 1971. When he was young, his family moved to Batesville, Indiana where he spent most of his youth. In May 1993, Broughton earned a Bachelor of Arts degree in English and Psychology from Indiana University, complemented by an Area Certificate in Environmental Studies from the same institution. During that time, Broughton studied abroad at the University of Kent in England from 1991 to 1992.

After he finished studying in Indiana, Broughton moved to Chicago, Illinois, where studied at the University of Chicago. From there, he earned a Master of Arts in Sociology in 1997 and a Doctor of Philosophy in Sociology in 2001. His doctoral dissertation, titled "Reforming Poor Women: The Cultural Politics and Practices of Welfare Reform," employed ethnographic analysis alongside state administrative data to examine welfare-to-work programs in Chicago.

Broughton's dissertation committee was chaired by Andrew Abbott, with Leslie Salzinger and Richard Taub as additional advisors.
