= Richard Taub =

American sociologist (1937–2020)

Richard P. Taub
- Born: April 16, 1937; Brooklyn, New York, U.S.
- Died: August 19, 2020 (aged 83); Santa Fe, New Mexico, U.S.

Academic background
- Education: University of Michigan; Harvard University
- Thesis: "Bureaucracy in the context of social change: a case study of the Indian administrative service" (1966)
- Doctoral advisor: Alex Inkeles

Academic work
- Discipline: Sociology
- Institutions: Brown University; University of Chicago

Richard Paul Taub (April 16, 1937 – August 19, 2020) was an American sociologist noted for his research on urban, rural, and community economic development. He was a faculty member of the University of Chicago's Department of Sociology and Department of Comparative Human Development and was also the Paul Klapper Professor in the Social Sciences.

Taub served as a consultant for many social enterprises, research institutions and community development organizations such as the Neighborhood Preservation Initiative, the National Community Development Initiative, and the National Opinion Research Center. He advised the South Shore Bank and the Shorebank Corporation from 1973-2007. His professional and academic concentrations included entrepreneurship, microloan programs, economic development, poverty, social change, the sociology of India, public policy initiatives, the evaluation of social programs, and the role of honor in generating behavioral outcomes.

Taub was the recipient of numerous academic awards, research grants and fellowships such as the University of Chicago Prize for Excellence in Graduate Teaching (2004), as a Distinguished Visitor at the John D. and Catherine T. MacArthur Foundation, and as a Resident Fellow at the W.E.B. Du Bois Institute for Afro-American Research at Harvard University (1997–98).

== Biography ==
Richard P. Taub was born in Brooklyn, New York in 1937. He completed his undergraduate degree at the University of Michigan where he also served as editor-in-chief of the Michigan Daily newspaper. After earning his BA in English Literature with Distinction and Honors in 1959, he moved on to Harvard University's Department of Social Relations where he received his MA in 1962 and his PhD in 1966, both in Sociology. During his time at Harvard he spent five years studying bureaucracy in India under the guidance of sociologist Alex Inkeles and anthropologist Cora Du Bois and with the support of Fulbright and the American Institute for Indian Studies. After completing his PhD, Taub was an Assistant Professor of Sociology at Brown University from 1965-1969.

In 1969, Taub moved to the University of Chicago, where he served in many roles over nearly five decades: as Assistant Professor of Sociology, Associate Professor of Social Sciences, Director of the Program for Urban Neighborhoods, Associate Dean of The College, Chair and Co-Chairman of the Undergraduate Program in Public Policy Studies at The College, Chairman of the Department of Comparative Human Development, the Paul Klapper Professor in the Social Sciences, and Professor in the Department of Comparative Human Development, Department of Sociology and The College. While living in Chicago he served on many local boards, as President of the Hyde Park Kenwood Community Development Association, as Chairman of the St. Thomas the Apostle School Board, and as a board member of the Seminary Cooperative Bookstore.

He received the Quantrell Award.

== Selected works ==
=== Books ===
- [with Wilson, W.J.] (2006) There Goes the Neighborhood: Racial, ethnic, and class tensions in four Chicago neighborhoods and their meaning for America, New York, NY: Random House
- (2004) Doing Development in Arkansas: Using credit to create opportunity for entrepreneurs outside the mainstream. Fayetteville AR: University of Arkansas
- (1988) Community Capitalism. Boston, MA: Harvard Business School Press
- [with Taub, D.L.] (1989) Entrepreneurship in India's Small-Scale Industries: An exploration of social contexts. Riverdale, MD: The Riverdale Press
- [with Taylor, D.G. & Dunham, J.D.] (1984) Paths of Neighborhood Change: Race and crime in urban America. Chicago, IL: University of Chicago Press.
- [with Taub, D.L.] (1974) American Society in Tocqueville's Time and Today. (Eds.), Chicago, IL: Rand McNally and Co.
- (1969) Bureaucrats Under Stress: Administrators and administration in an Indian state. Berkeley, CA: University of California Press.

=== Articles and Chapters ===
[with Wilson, W.J.] (2008) There Goes the Neighborhood: Racial, ethnic, and class tensions in four Chicago neighborhoods and their meaning for America. In D.B. Grusky (Ed.), Social Stratification: Class, race, and gender in sociological perspective (3rd ed.) (pp 716–727). Boulder, CO: Westview Press.

(2007) Research on Entrepreneurship, Culture and Law. Comparative Labor Law and Policy Journal, 28(4), 893-898.

(1998) Making the Adaptation Across Cultures and Societies: A report on an attempt to clone the Grameen Bank in southern Arkansas. Journal of Developmental Entrepreneurship, 3(1), 14-29.

[with Taylor D.G. & Peterson B.] (1986) Crime, Community Organization, and Causes of Neighborhood Decline. In R. Figlio, S. Hakim, & G. Rengert (Eds.), Metropolitan Criminal Patterns. (pp161–177) Monsey, NY: Willowtree Press.

[with Taub D.L.] Cutback Entrepreneurs. (1980) In S. Seymour (ed.), The Transformation of a Sacred Town: Bhubaneswar, India, Boulder, CO: Westview Press.

[with Surgeon G., Lindholm S., Betts Otti P., & Bridges A.] (1977) Urban Voluntary Associations, Locality Based and Externally Induced. American Journal of Sociology, 83(2), 425-442.

=== Papers Presented ===
(2006, August). Bridging Theoretical Divides: Race, culture, and concentrated poverty in American cities, Paper presented at the American Sociological Association Annual Meeting, Montreal, QB, Canada.

(1994, October). "The Southern Development Bancorporation Lessons Learned: The first five years". Paper presented at the American Agricultural Law Association Conference, Memphis, TN.

(1991, October). Differing Conceptions of Honor and Orientations Toward Work and Marriage Among Low-Income African-Americans and Mexican-Americans. Paper presented at the University of Chicago Urban Family Life Conference, Chicago, IL.

(1991) Published by Center for Urban Inequality, University of Chicago.

(1990) Nuance and Meaning in Community Development: Finding community and development. Community Development Research Center, Paper presented at the Graduate School of Management and Urban Policy, New School for Social Research.

(1990) Published in National Social Science Journal.

(1990, April). Community Integration and the Role of Institutional Actors. Paper presented at the Urban Affairs Association Annual Meeting, Charlotte, NC.

[with Grzywinski, R. & Reardon, E.] (1990, January). Capital and the Promotion of Entrepreneurship. Paper presented at the Organisation for Economic Co-operation and Development Conference on Enterprise and Employment Creation in Rural Areas, Paris, France.

=== Reports ===
[with Dunham, J.D. & Taylor G.] National Opinion Research Center. (1982). Safe and Secure Neighborhoods: Territoriality, Solidarity, and the Reduction of Crime. Chicago, IL.

[with Sander, S. & Bannor, J.] The Center for Urban Research and Policy Studies. Integration and Racial Change in Six Chicago Suburban Communities. Chicago, IL.
