= There Goes the Neighborhood =

There Goes the Neighborhood may refer to:

== Albums and songs ==
- There Goes the Neighborhood (album), by American rock guitarist/vocalist Joe Walsh in 1981
- There Goes the Neighborhood!, by American jazz musician Gary Bartz, 1991
- Whoops! There Goes the Neighbourhood, 1989 album by British New Wave band The Blow Monkeys
- "There Goes the Neighborhood" (Body Count song), by American heavy metal band in 1992
- "There Goes the Neighborhood" (Sheryl Crow song), by American rocker in 1998
- There Goes the Neighborhood (EP), by American rapper Chris Webby in 2011
- There Goes the Neighborhood, 2020 mixtape by American rap/R&B collective Grouptherapy
- There Goes the Neighborhood, 2024 album by punk rock band Kid Kapichi

== Books ==
- There Goes the Neighbourhood: An Irreverent History of Canada, 1992 collection of satirical cartoons by Adrian Raeside
- There Goes the Neighborhood (book), 2006 investigative study by American sociologists William Julius Wilson and Richard Taub

== Visual and audio media ==
- There Goes the Neighborhood (film), 1992 American comedy a/k/a Paydirt
- Backyard Wrestling 2: There Goes the Neighborhood, 2004 American video game
- There Goes the Neighborhood (TV series), 2009 American reality TV
- "There Goes the Neighborhood" (The Vampire Diaries), April 1, 2010 episode of American TV series
- There Goes the Neighborhood (podcast), 2010s American podcast
- There Goes the Neighborhood (Friday Night Lights), an episode of the TV series Friday Night Lights
