= Numoni =

Singaporean application developer

- Company type: Private Limited
- Founded: January 2‚ 2012
- Headquarters: Singapore; Malaysia; Indonesia; Philippines; Hong Kong
- Key people: Dr SC Tan, Chairman; Norma SIt, CEO
- Products: Nugen Nighthawk; Nugen Apache; Nugen Thunderbird I
- Services: Local and international airtime top-up Bill payment Travel/gift/prepaid cards sales Top-up/repayment collection
- Number of employees: 150
- Website: www.numoni.com

Numoni is a Singaporean micro-transaction application developer. It is a fintech start up. Founded in 2012, the company’s aim is to bring financial inclusion to the underbanked in Southeast Asia. The company develops and manufactures devices that help the underbanked to carry out micro-transactions such as topping up mobile phone accounts, making little remittances and paying off loans.

== History ==
Numoni was founded in 2012 by Norma Sit, a former Visa International executive. The company is credited with developing and creating Singapore's first micro-transaction terminal. These terminals were aimed specifically at Singapore's large foreign worker population, many of whom are underbanked.

There are currently 80 such terminals across Singapore, allowing members of the public to use cash to top up mobile phone accounts in other parts of Southeast Asia.

It has one Patent with number 9,210,277 B2, granted by the US Patent and Trademark Office on December 8, 2015. In it a system a method for purchasing and reloading airtime for a local and foreign prepaid mobile phone account is detailed.

== Expansion ==
In order to meet the needs of its customers, Numoni has entered into agreements with various telecommunication companies around the region, including XL Axiata, the Philippines’ Globe and Smart Communications and Bangladesh’s Grameenphone. These collaborations have allowed Numoni to offer the e-wallet service to foreign workers of these countries.
