= Chicago Community Loan Fund =

US community development financial institution

- Founded: 1991
- Type: Non-profit
- Location: Chicago, Illinois
- Services: Pre-Development Loans, Technical Assistance, Housing Cooperative Loan, Minipermanent Mortgage Loan
- Fields: Affordable Housing, Community Development
- Website: cclfchicago.org

Chicago Community Loan Fund (CCLF) is a certified community development financial institution (CDFI) that provides loans and grants to community development organizations engaged in affordable housing, social service and economic development initiatives in Chicago.

== Mission and focus ==
CCLF's mission, as stated on its website, is "to provide low cost, flexible financing to community development organizations... throughout metropolitan Chicago." Its focus is on providing loans to agencies engaged in planning and building affordable housing. It also lends money to other types of community development organizations and organizations that support environmental sustainability, such as Chicago's nonprofit car-sharing program, I-GO, Logan Square Kitchen, a commercial shared-use kitchen and 75-seat event space, and Whistler-Crossing in Riverdale, IL, the first LEED for Neighborhood Development (LEED-ND) in Illinois.

The loan fund is distinguished from traditional banks by its track record of taking on "risky" projects, such as affordable housing and cooperative housing, and by its high level of assistance to borrowers. One of the unique technical assistance programs it offers is the Project Readiness Workshop, occurring about four times a year, which it describes as "intensive" all-day "sessions that provide an overview of the complexities and requirements involved in launching and sustaining a successful real estate development project". CCLF also organizes a yearly "Building for Sustainability" seminar at the Chicago Center for Green Technology.

Over the next four years CCLF aims to increase lending volume and accelerate the rate of business development, social service provision, and job growth in the communities of Englewood, North Lawndale, and Woodlawn on the South Side and West Side of Chicago and in parts of two high-poverty suburban corridors.

CCLF is certified by the US Department of Treasury's CDFI Fund and is an active member of the Opportunity Finance Network.

== History ==
CCLF was founded in 1991 by a small group of Chicago investors, with an initial investment of $200,000. It has since grown to more than $21 million in total capital under management. The fund's loan history comprises 160 loans totaling over $36 million. The fund has been led by executive director Calvin Holmes since 1998.

In 2009, CCLF was a recipient of the MacArthur Award for Creative and Effective Institutions, and will use its $500,000 award to enhance its current lending in low-income communities and encourage the incorporation of sustainable building technologies into community development strategies and projects.

== Sustainability ==
CCLF's culture involves a heavy emphasis on environmentalism and sustainability. The agency actively encourages the use of energy-efficient building standards and materials in the construction of community real estate developments.

Project example: In 2007, CCLF provided nearly $1.2 million in pre-development funding to the Historic Pacesetter LP / Whistler Crossing project in Riverdale, Illinois. The money went to support the first phase of mixed-use, mixed income subdivision redevelopment (housing for rental and ownership, as well as new commercial space). The project featured the following design features: solar water heating systems, low-VOC materials, energy-efficient appliances, recycled and locally sourced building materials, bioswales, and transit-oriented design.

CCLF has organized an annual Building for Sustainability workshop since 2006, and regularly hosts a Sustainable Builders Working Group for community development professionals interested in supporting sustainable community projects. CCLF has published several editions of "A Guide to Building for Sustainability," a booklet of techniques, resources, and case studies of affordable housing. In 2009, the agency released a new website dedicated to sustainable building resources in the Chicago area.

== See also ==
- Affordable housing
- Community development financial institution (CDFI)
- I-GO
- Accion USA
- Local Initiatives Support Corporation (LISC)
- Lutheran Volunteer Corps
