= Xuzhou No. 5 High School =

School in Xuzhou, China

Xuzhou No. 5 High School (Chinese: 徐州市第五中学) is a public secondary school in Xuzhou, Jiangsu, China, established in 1905.

== History ==
The private Peixin Academy (培心书院) was established in 1905 as a missionary school. It was renamed as Peixin middle school, or Peizheng middle school. In 1952, the Xuzhou government took it over and named it Xuzhou No. 5 Middle School of Shandong Province. In 1953, because Xuzhou was put under Jiangsu province, the name is changed into Xuzhou Number 5 Middle School.

== Today ==
Xuzhou No. 5 Middle School now is a three-star high school. Instruction includes classes of lyre-playing, chess, calligraphy and painting, a 21-or 25-stringed plucked instrument, I-go, manners, poetry and other classes with strong ethnic characteristics which contribute to inheriting and developing Chinese traditional culture. Small class teaching has been implemented in Xuzhou Number 5 Middle School.

== Facilities ==
The campus is about 31,000 square metres. The building area is 13,885 square meters. There are laboratory building, office building, peizheng building, wusan building, teaching buildings, and history museum building.

- Laboratory building

In the laboratory building, there is a theatre classroom with multi-media facilities which is equipped with 3oo seats. Besides this, there are 3 physics Labs, 2 Chemistry labs, 2 Biology labs, 1 labor and technology classroom. The fourth floor and fifth floor are usually used for music teaching, dancing teaching art teaching and varied activities.

- Teaching buildings

At present, Xuzhou Number 5 middle school has a total of 46 classrooms, which includes 24 senior high school classrooms and 22 junior high school classrooms and make up 3 teaching buildings. All of the three buildings are allocated with screens, slide projectors, recording machines, and video cassette recorders.

- Library

In the library, there are about 8,3714 books, more than 7,0000 books of them have been put into computers. Students can read books in different fields.

== Teaching staff ==
Nowadays, the staff total 195. Among them, there are 164 part-time teachers, 43 senior teachers, 85 elementary teachers. Most of the teachers are dedicated, careful and hardworking in teaching, as a result, a few dozens of them win the title of "famous teachers". what's more, 16 teachers have been named as a provincial and municipal outstanding teachers.

== Notable alumni ==
- Ma Ke (馬可), musician
- Zhu Rui (朱瑞), artillery commander of the People's Liberation Army (PLA)
- Hu Xiuying (胡秀英), botanist
