= Margaret Sullivan =

Margaret Sullivan may refer to

- Margaret Frances Sullivan (1847–1903), Irish-born American author, journalist, and editor
- Margaret Sullivan (journalist), American journalist
- Margaret Sullivan (bureaucrat) (born 1962), American politician and agency officer
- Margaret Virginia Sullivan (1851–1926), American-Australian actress

== See also ==
- Margaret Sullavan (1909–1960), American actress
