= Mary Houghton =

Mary Houghton is co-founder of ShoreBank, the largest and oldest community development bank. Houghton, along with Milton Davis, James Fletcher, and Ron Grzywinski purchased in 1973 what was then South Shore Bank to fight redlining in the Chicago neighborhood. She retired as president in May 2010.

== Biography ==
In the early 1980s, Houghton and Grzywinski worked with Muhammad Yunus of the Grameen Bank in Bangladesh (Yunus and Grameen Bank received the 2006 Nobel Peace Prize). From 1986 to 2001, Houghton served on the Board of Directors of Accion International.

Houghton serves as a director of Vancity Community Investment Bank in Toronto and served as a director of the Calvert Foundation and Women's World Banking.

She is a member of the Ashoka Global Academy for Social Entrepreneurship.

Houghton received a B.A. cum laude from Marquette University and an M.A. in International Studies from Johns Hopkins University.

In 2009, Houghton served as one of six selection committee members for the Rudy Bruner Award for Urban Excellence.

== Awards and honors ==
Houghton has received several awards and honors:

- In 2001, she was awarded Honorary Doctorate of Business by Northern Michigan University.
- In 2004, she was named “Community Banker of the Year” by American Banker magazine for her work making ShoreBank “the gold standard of community development banks."
- In 2009, Houghton accepted the 2009 Economic Opportunity Achievement Award from The Opportunity Collaboration in Ixtapa, Mexico for her work "providing financial services and information to residents who were excluded from traditional banking circles."
- In 2009, she was invited to deliver the "Leaders Forum Lecture" at the Yale School of Management.
- Jointly with co-founder Ron Grzywinski, Houghton received the Hesburgh Award for Ethics in Business from the University of Notre Dame, in 2008, and the Gleitsman Citizen Activist Award at Harvard University, in 2006. They were both named to U.S. News & World Report's list of America's Top Leaders
