= Urban Partnership Bank =

American company

- Industry: Banking
- Founded: 2010
- Headquarters: Chicago, IL, United States
- Key people: David Vitale, Chairman; William Farrow, CEO
- Website: www.upbnk.com

Urban Partnership Bank was a Federal Deposit Insurance Corporation, full-service community development bank in the United States with $1.4 billion in assets. It was established on August 20, 2010 when it acquired the deposits and some of the assets of ShoreBank from the FDIC. It was headquartered in Chicago, Illinois. After chronic losses, it was acquired on Jan 30, 2019 by Providence Bank & Trust.

The bank's stated mission was to build vibrant urban neighborhoods, promote economic and environmental sustainability in distressed and underserved areas of Chicago, Cleveland, and Detroit. Its customers ranged from individuals to small businesses, nonprofits, foundations, and faith-based organizations. The bank placed a special emphasis on serving underbanked populations.

== Origin ==
Urban Partnership Bank was founded in 2011 by the former management of the failed, but politically connected, ShoreBank after the FDIC took the unusual step of permitting the current management team to remain in place and maintain ownership of ShoreBank by allowing them to purchase ShoreBank through the newly chartered Urban Partnership Bank. Although ShoreBank’s President William Farrow was brought on after regulators ordered ShoreBank to raise additional capital, it is highly unusual for the FDIC to resell to the managers who ran the failed bank. The Urban Partnership Bank became a viable institution thanks to capital injections from large US banks totaling $140 million, write downs taken on nonperforming assets by the FDIC which cost taxpayers $367.7 million and a loss-share agreement to cover future additional losses on assets.

Urban Partnership Bank acquired all of ShoreBank's $1.54 billion in deposits and most of its $2.16 billion in assets. The FDIC and Urban Partnership Bank shared the losses of $1.41 billion of those assets at 20% and 80%, respectively. The new bank was capitalized with nearly $140 million.

In July 2011 Urban Partnership Bank was certified as a community development financial institution (CDFI). As such, other institutions could receive Community Reinvestment Act credit for depositing their funds in the bank. It was eligible to apply for programs through the CDFI Fund that support its mission to revitalize its urban neighborhoods.

Urban Partnership Bank was also certified as a Minority Depository Institution (MDI), which meant that the bank was working towards improving and strengthening the community's overall well-being.

== Operations history ==
After enduring significant losses every year since its creation, the bank moved to cut its operating costs in 2016 by reducing its overall number of branches and employees. This resulted in stable fourth quarter numbers and the bank's first ever profit. In September 2018, Providence Bank & Trust of South Holland, Illinois, a bank with 12 branches in the Chicago area, announced that it would purchase Urban Partnership. The acquisition was completed on Jan 30, 2019.

=== Leadership ===
Urban Partnership Bank was led by a team of experienced financial services professionals with roots in the community. Urban Partnership Bank President William Farrow and Executive Chairman David Vitale have said that their personal histories led them to take on the task of filling ShoreBank’s shoes.

=== Serving the underbanked ===
Urban Partnership Bank positioned itself as a lower-cost competitor to currency exchanges and other cash-checking outlets, providing transaction services like prepaid cards to consumers who didn’t have bank relationships. The bank was closing loan offices and big branch locations and replacing them with “micro-branches” or full-service banking offices that were more welcoming to its customers.

=== Branch locations ===
In Chicago, the bank’s branches served the communities of Chatham, Austin, Bellwood, Bronzeville, Greater Grand Crossing, South Shore, Kenwood, Loop, West Ridge, and Stone Park. The bank also maintained branches in Cleveland and Detroit.
