= National Cooperative Bank =

Cooperative bank in the United States

- Founded: August 1978; 47 years ago
- Headquarters: Crystal City, Arlington, Virginia, U.S.
- Number of locations: 3 (2026)
- Area served: United States
- Key people: Casey Fannon, President and CEO
- Website: www.ncb.coop

The National Cooperative Bank is a congressionally chartered cooperative bank in the United States created by the National Consumer Cooperative Bank Act of 1978 (Pub. L. 95–351). National Cooperative Bank offers banking products and services to cooperatives, their members and social organizations nationwide.

The bank was created to address the financial needs of an underserved market. NCB is an advocate for America's cooperatives and their members, placing special emphasis on serving the needs of communities that are economically challenged.

NCB has focused on community revitalization. The employment of the cooperative model in the development of business contains access to affordable health care and affordable housing.

Capital Impact Partners was the non-profit community development financial institution subsidiary of the NCB. It became a stand-alone organization in 2014.

== Board of Directors ==
The Bank is governed by a Board of Directors which consists of 15 members. All members serve for terms of three years. Twelve members of the board are elected by the holders of class B stock and class C stock. The remaining three members are appointed by the President, by and with the advice and consent of the Senate. Of these three members one shall be selected from among proprietors of small business concerns, as defined under section 632 of title 15, which are manufacturers or retailers; one member shall be selected from among the officers of the agencies and departments of the United States; and one member shall be selected from among persons having extensive experience in the cooperative field representing low-income cooperatives eligible to borrow from the Bank.

After the expiration of the term of any member, such member may continue to serve until their successor has been elected or has been appointed and confirmed. Any member appointed by the President may be removed for cause by the President.

The board annually elects from among its members a chairman and vice chairman, and selects a secretary who need not be a member.

=== Board members appointed by the President ===
The current members of the board that are appointed by the President, as of May 24, 2026:

Name	Group	Confirmed	Term expires
Vacant	Small business manufacturers or retailers		
Vacant	Officers of U.S. agencies and departments		
Vacant	Experience representing low-income cooperatives		
