= Boom, Bust, Exodus =

Boom, Bust, Exodus: The Rust Belt, the Maquilas, and a Tale of Two Cities by Chad Broughton is the narrative nonfiction account of a Maytag appliance factory that relocates from Galesburg, Illinois, a small city at the western edge of the American Rust Belt, to Reynosa, Tamaulipas, a booming city at the U.S.-Mexico border. The book provides a detailed account of these two places as they change over time drawing on industrial histories, ethnographic observation, oral history interviews, and fieldwork on both sides of the border. In the Galesburg chapters, Boom, Bust, Exodus explores how blue collar families cope, adapt, and, in some cases, thrive, in the decade after the devastating 2004 layoffs. In Reynosa, which in 2015 had nearly 100,000 industrial jobs in the maquiladora (export-oriented factories) sector, Boom, Bust, Exodus offers a ground-level look at Mexico's rapid transition to a globalized economy. In addition, to tell Reynosa's story, Broughton takes the reader to rural Veracruz—from which many of the maquiladora workers have migrated—in order to more fully understand the brave new world of North American economic integration. According to the publisher, "Boom, Bust, Exodus gives us the voices of those who have borne the heaviest burdens of the economic upheavals of the past three decades. A deeply personal work grounded in solid scholarship, this important, immersive, and affecting book brings home the price and the cost of globalization."

== Reception of Boom, Bust, Exodus ==
Boom, Bust, Exodus has received national coverage including in the New York Times, Marketplace from American Public Media, the Huffington Post, The Atlantic, and Shortwave, the foreign affairs podcast of PBS. It has also garnered regional coverage in both the Midwest and in Texas.

Reviews of Boom, Bust, Exodus have generally been positive. Publishers Weekly described it as a "a powerful indictment of corporate greed and poor public policy, balanced by a tribute to the perseverance of the working-class people of two nations." The Boston Globe writes that "Broughton describes a modern-day Dickensian nightmare, with workers flocking from formerly agricultural regions to work for Maytag and other US companies seeking to 'slough off not only union wages, pension obligations, taxes and regulations, but also any sense of obligation to the place where they made their money.' The author writes winningly of individual workers in both cities, but this book is as discouraging as it is necessary." The Washington Monthly praised the "rigorous reporting and extensive interviews with workers," but was critical of its "nostalgia for the heyday of the American union." In terms of writing style, a review in the Chicago Tribune compared the book to a "sweeping novel" that is "steeped in nuance" but in which "the extent of the background can get tiring." The Texas Observer writes, "It took Broughton more than 10 years to research and write this book, and he has crafted a narrative that reads like a novel, well paced and free of polemic."

== See also ==
- Publisher page for Boom, Bust, Exodus: The Rust Belt, the Maquilas, and a Tale of Two Cities
