= Margaret Sullivan (civil servant) =

American chief of staff

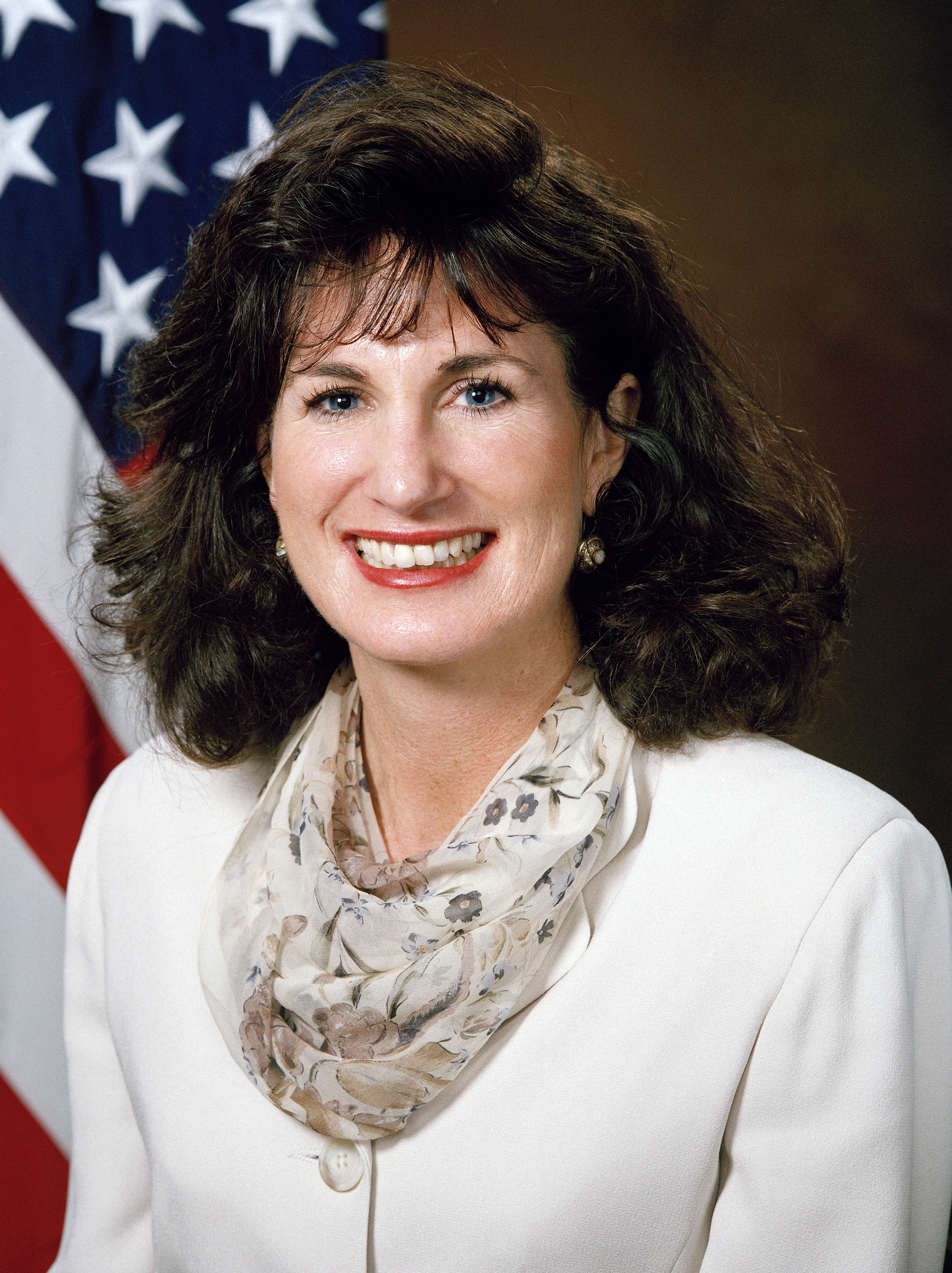
Margaret C. Sullivan in May 1995

Margaret C. Sullivan (born March 10, 1962, in Orange County, California) is a former Chief Operating Officer and Chief of Staff for the U.S. Agency for International Development. Before she joined the Obama administration, she served as Director of Political Risk Management at Farallon Capital Management, a large investment firm based in San Francisco, California.

Sullivan began her federal career on Capitol Hill, where she served as a Professional Staff Member of the House Permanent Select Committee on Intelligence and as National Security Adviser to the House Majority Leader. In 1994, Sullivan joined the Clinton administration and served as The Special Assistant to Defense Secretary William Perry, helping to manage his relationship with the White House, Congress and national press corps. At the Department of Housing and Urban Development, she served as West Coast Regional Director and as Chief of Staff for Secretary Andrew Cuomo. She has also served as Chief of Staff for the United States Trade Representative in the Executive Office of the President.

== Early career and education ==
Originally from California, Sullivan graduated with a bachelor's degree in political science from Stanford University and was a two-year MacArthur Fellow at the University of Maryland where she earned a master's degree in public management.

Upon graduation, Sullivan worked as a legislative assistant for Senator Gary Hart from 1984 to 1987. After she served as Congressman Nicholas Mavroules' representative to the Armed Services Committee. She also worked on the staff of House of Representatives Permanent Select Committee on Intelligence in 1991 and as a senior policy advisor to House Majority Leader Richard Gephardt from 1992 to 1994.

== Political career ==
=== Defense ===
Sullivan began working as the Special Assistant, the civilian equivalent to the Chief of Staff, to Defense Secretary William Perry in 1994 where she managed the Secretary's relationship with the press corps, the White House and the United States Congress.

The press debacle during the Somalia operations of the early 1990s, the emergence of the 24-hour news cycle and the widespread adoption of the internet forced the military to alter its interaction with the press corps around military operations. Sullivan and White House advisor David Gergen coordinated the Defense Department and the U.S. military's interaction with the media during the invasion of Haiti. To protect the lives of U.S. soldiers and ensure the military's strategy was accurately understood by the media, Sullivan coordinated conference calls between the Joint Chiefs of Staff and the network bureau chiefs to brief the media on what the military expected to happen each day in Haiti. According to the McCormick Tribune Foundation, this more open model of communication between the press and the military is now commonplace.

Sullivan also helped manage the reorganization of the Defense Finance and Accounting Service (DFAS), the agency that provides finance and accounting services for the civil and military members of the department. In the mid-1990s, the agency allowed municipalities to bid on where the department would operate DFAS centers. Today, the DFAS operates in 13 cities throughout the United States.

=== Trade Representative ===
Sullivan served as the Chief of Staff to the United States Trade Representative (USTR) Charlene Barshefsky from 1996 to 1997. There she oversaw the day-to-day operations of the office and developed negotiation and lobbying strategies for granting China Permanent Normal Trade Relations status, the 1996 Telecommunications Agreement, and the enforcement measures for the Intellectual Trade Agreement of 1996.

Sullivan helped lead the White House's effort to gain congressional approval of Permanent Normal Trade Relations (PNTR) status, which had been a contentious issue in Congress for many years. The passage of congressional legislation granting China PNTR status cleared the final hurdle for China's accession to the World Trade Organization (WTO) in 2000 and the opening of the country to the world. According to the International Monetary Fund, China's GDP has grown at an average rate of 9.9% since being accepted to the WTO.

In her role as Chief of Staff, Sullivan helped manage the USTR office's role in negotiating the 1996 WTO Telecommunications Agreement which opened worldwide telecommunication markets to competition and set the rules that governed the emerging wireless, cable and fixed-line communications market. The Institute for International Economic estimated the agreement would save consumers $1 trillion by 2010.

=== Housing and Urban Development ===
Sullivan was appointed to Housing and Urban Development Chief of Staff by Secretary Andrew Cuomo in 1997.

In 1997, Sullivan contributed to HUDs effort to stop bad landlords from taking advantage of federal assistance intended for low income housing.

In 1998, she served as the Clinton Administration's Housing & Urban Development west coast representative. There she managed HUD operational activities throughout the California.

== Farallon Capital Management ==
Sullivan served as the Director of Political Risk Analysis for Farallon Capital Management, an investment firm with over $20 billion in aggregate capital, from 2000 to 2011. Farallon was founded by Tom Steyer in 1986. Her role included identifying and tracking market opportunities created by regulatory and legislative changes within state and federal governments. She also managed Farallon's communication strategy.

== Political activism ==
In 2007, Sullivan was part of "The Lincoln Brigade", a Democratic Party task force to kill the California Presidential Electoral College Reform Initiative, a proposed ballot measure that would have appeared on the June 2008 California ballot. The Republican sponsored measure, if passed, would have changed the way California allocates its presidential electoral votes in time for the 2008 presidential election.

She contributed and raised money for the Hillary Clinton for President campaign.

Sullivan was also co-chair of the Steering Committee of "No on Proposition 23 Campaign", an effort to save California's clean energy and air pollution control standards, as well as co-chair of the Steering Committee of "Californians for Clean Energy Jobs."

== Community involvement ==
Sullivan helped found and then served on the board of an Oakland-based community development bank, OneCalifornia Bank. The bank functions as a regulated financial institution, but provides commercial banking services to underserved small and medium-size businesses, nonprofits, affordable-housing developers, community facilities, as well as families and individuals in the Bay Area.

Sullivan also served alongside her brothers as a Development Advisory Board Member at Casa Teresa, a home for single pregnant women living on welfare founded by her parents.

== Awards ==
Sullivan received the Secretary of Defense's Distinguished Service Award in 1996. She also received the League of Women Voters-Bay Area Chapter's Women of the Year Award in 2011.

== Personal life ==
Sullivan lives in Washington, DC.

== See also ==
- Farallon Capital Management
- Tom Steyer
