= Center for Neighborhood Technology =

Non-profit transportation civic organization in Chicago

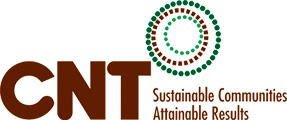
- Founded: 1978; 48 years ago
- Type: Non-governmental organization
- Purpose: Sustainable Development
- Location: Chicago
- Coordinates: 41.8866261°N 87.6289914°W
- Region served: National
- Website: Center for Neighborhood Technology

The Center for Neighborhood Technology (CNT) is a non-profit organization, headquartered in Chicago, Illinois, which is committed to sustainable development and urban communities.

The organization was founded in 1978 by Scott Bernstein, Stanley Hallett, and Dr. John Martin. It has recently grown to include an office in San Francisco, California. CNT has been responsible for developing a variety of projects. It launched two non-profits; Elevate Energy, an organization that develops and implements initiatives to help consumers and communities control energy costs and reduce energy use; and I-GO, a membership-based car sharing organization that provides hourly rental of a fleet of cars located across Chicago and its surrounding suburbs. It also created Wireless Community Networks, a Wireless internet access project which uses a mesh network. CNT's Urban Practice Consulting offers a menu of tools which can be applied individually or collectively to urban development and redevelopment.

== Leadership ==
Nina Idemudia, AICP, is CNT's Chief Executive Officer as of September 2023. She was preceded by Robert Dean, who shifted to become the organization's Chief Strategy and Program Officer. Jacky Grimshaw, who joined CNT in 1992, is CNT's Vice President for Policy, Transportation & Community Development.

== Recognition and awards ==
CNT was recognized on April 28, 2009, as one of only eight organizations from around the world to receive the John D. and Catherine T. MacArthur Foundation Award. CNT received the award for its use of research to improve the quality of life in urban neighborhoods, including car sharing and energy audits.

== Office Renovation ==
In 2000, the Center for Neighborhood Technology renovated their offices to the highest standards of the LEED Green Building Rating System. In December 2005, the building became the thirteenth building to receive a "Platinum" LEED ranking.

== Climate ==
The Center for Neighborhood Technology has been conducting research and developing programs to use urban resources more efficiently. These efforts relate to the growing concerns about reducing greenhouse gas emissions and slowing global warming.

In September 2008, the City of Chicago released its Climate Action Plan, which describes the major effects climate change could have on the city and suggested ways to address those challenges. CNT led the mitigation research team for the Chicago Climate Change Task Force that developed the report.

CNT took part in developing the Presidential Climate Action Plan, a plan to help the next President of the United States take action on global warming within the first 100 days of the new administration.

== Energy ==
In 2000, Elevate Energy (formerly known as the Community Energy Cooperative) was created. Elevate Energy's areas of focus include building performance and energy efficiency, real-time electricity pricing, climate change analysis, regional energy planning, and green building research.

In June 2008, CNT launched the Illinois Smart Grid Initiative, a voluntary group of state and local government, as well as consumer, business, environmental and utility stakeholders that collaborated to examine how consumers can benefit from an overhaul and modernization of the power grid in Illinois.

CNT, in collaboration with the Community Investment Corporation, created the Cook County Energy Savers to provide owners of multi-family buildings with recommendations and solutions for energy efficiency. CNT published "Engaging as Partners in Energy Efficiency: Multifamily Housing and Utilities" in 2012, discussing how upgrades in multifamily buildings could save both building owners and residents up to a billion nationwide.

One of Elevate Energy's most recent projects is Power Smart Pricing, which allows users to pay the hourly, wholesale market price of electricity, and save money by timing their electricity usage to the hours when it is cheapest.

== Water ==
CNT helps communities with problems regarding water infrastructure like unreliable service, rising water rates, and flooded neighborhoods. In 2012, CNT launched the "Smart Water for Smart Regions" initiative, which includes research, solutions, and regional advocacy focused on water supply and stormwater in Illinois, Indiana, Michigan, Minnesota, New York, Ohio, Pennsylvania, and Wisconsin. The initiative helps communities deliver water services to homes and business while sustaining water resources in the region.

Another issue CNT considers a priority is the handling of stormwater. Its goals are to reduce flooding, cut stormwater treatment and energy costs, and protect rivers, lakes, and vital landscape. In 2005, CNT developed a way to measure the effects of storm water management in an effort to promote green infrastructure that better handles storm water (i.e. rain gardens, porous pavement, green roofs, drainage swales). The Green Values calculator allows developers, regulators and property owners to assess the economic and hydrological impact of green and conventional storm water management.

Working with Hey and Associates, Inc., CNT published "Monitoring and Documenting the Performance of Stormwater Best Management Practices" in 2012, a report on a 2009-2010 project to monitor and document the performance of stormwater management practices. There were three components of the project:

1. Conducting real-time monitoring on a bioswale and two patches of permeable concrete and documented the results;
2. Developing and implementing an inventory of green infrastructure features throughout the 6-county Chicago Region;
3. Selecting 15 rain gardens for infiltration testing and three of those for additional synthetic drawdown testing and documenting the results.

CNT published "The Value of Green Infrastructure: A Guide to Recognizing Its Economic, Environmental and Social Benefits" in January, 2011, an analysis that places an economic value on the benefits provided by green infrastructure.

Students at St. Margaret Mary plant a rain garden

In October, 2008, CNT collaborated with the Water Environment Federation (WEF) to organize the building of a rain garden in Pulaski Park.

CNT's "Recommendations for Integrated Water Resources Planning in Lake Zurich" provides analysis and recommendations to the Village of Lake Zurich on an integrated water resources plan.

=== Other Natural Resources ===
CNT's work with natural resources is concentrated on making the most of natural resources, and using them in a sustainable way. Areas of focus include developing tools to map and analyze the values of green infrastructure, researching and demonstrating stormwater management practices, and promoting changes in local, regional and national policy.

As a result of a 2000 Openlands conference on natural resource protection in Wisconsin, Illinois, and Indiana, and Openlands' inability to find a map of the green infrastructure for the three states, CNT launched the Natural Connections project. A data archive for a 19-county region was created, allowing users to download most of the data collected on green infrastructure for those areas. An interactive web mapping tool allows users to take this data and create customized maps of the region's green infrastructure.

== Transportation & Community Development ==
CNT promotes research on housing and transportation affordability, developing communities and public involvement in shaping policy. Its work has led to the creation of the I-GO car sharing program, and a number of tools created to increase awareness of the importance of transportation planning and promote improved mass transit.

CNT is a founder of the Surface Transportation Policy Partnership (STPP), which is a nationwide coalition working to promote better transportation choices, Jacky Grimshaw is the Chair of the STPP steering committee.

In 2003, CNT, along with Reconnecting America and Strategic Economics, launched the Center for Transit-Oriented Development (CTOD) to help bring transit-oriented development (TOD) to scale as a nationally recognized real estate product.

As part of their commitment to TOD, CNT helped form the Lake Street Coalition, which successfully fought to keep the 'L' station at Pulaski and Lake Streets open when the CTA threatened to close it in the early 1990s. They then joined with another member of the Lake Street Coalition, Bethel New Life, in an effort to revitalize and rehabilitate the area surrounding the 'L' station; initiating a neighborhood planning process. CNT has also signed agreements with two communities, Blue Island and Harvey, for a public planning project that draws community benefits from already existing but undervalued transit and freight assets in Cook County suburbs.

=== Housing + Transportation Affordability Index ===
In 2006, CNT began developing the Housing + Transportation Affordability Index to come up with a more realistic way of considering the affordability of an area's housing. The Housing + Transportation Affordability Index maps neighborhoods based on their mean income and average housing and transportation costs, making customers more aware of the affordability of housing in that area.

In 2008, the Housing + Transportation Affordability Index became available through an interactive look-up and mapping website, which measures the affordability of housing for 52 metropolitan areas. In 2010, the H+T Index expanded to 337 metropolitan areas in the United States, providing support for more than 80% of the U.S. population. By 2012, this figure had increased to more than 900 metropolitan areas and 89% of the population. In 2012, CNT published "Safe, Decent and Affordable: Transportation Costs of Affordable Housing in the Chicago Region", which applies the HT Index to multifamily properties financed by the Illinois Housing Development Authority in Chicago. The study reveals the average transportation costs in these locations.

CNT launched in 2010, an online application that uses the H+T Index to show users their H+T scores graphically on a map while giving average cost of transportation figures. Since 2011, Abogo (a portmanteau of "abode" and "to go") has had a gas price feature, which allows users to see what effect rising gas prices will have on their monthly transportation prices.

In the March 18-19, 2009 Federal hearing on "Livable Communities, Transit Oriented Development, and Incorporating Green Building Practices into Federal Housing and Transportation Policy", CNT's work (some of it through CTOD) was cited several times in the testimonies of the U.S. Housing and Urban Development (HUD), Secretary, Shaun Donovan, and U.S. Department of Transportation (DOT) Secretary, Ray LaHood as they announced the creation of an interagency partnership to promote sustainable communities through coordinating housing and transportation policy and investments.

In February 2012, CNT published "Prospering in Place: Linking Jobs, Development, and Transit to Spur Chicago's Economy", a message on restoring location efficiency and creating new jobs and economic vitality based on Chicago's assets and advantages.

== Legacy projects ==
=== Wet cleaning ===
During the 1990s, with funding from the U.S. Environmental Protection Agency and others, CNT began a research project with the Greener Cleaner to develop and test the viability of wet cleaning technology. Wet cleaning, in place of traditional dry cleaning methods, reduces and even eliminates the use of solvents that are hazardous both to workers and communities. Working with industry trade associations and others, CNT staff were able to promote the use of wet cleaning and help create pollution prevention recognition and certification programs.

=== Wireless Community Networks (WCN) ===
WCN is a community wireless network project developed by the Center for Neighborhood Technology for the Chicago area. Started in 2002, WCN uses a mesh network to provide high-speed internet access to members of local communities. The project is part of a community economic development strategy, and seeks to narrow the digital divide by operating in underserved areas.
