= Community development bank =

Bank serving underserved or excluded communities

A community development bank (CDB) or Community Development Financial Institution (CDFI) is a development bank or credit union that focus on serving people who have been locked out of the traditional financial systems such as the unbanked or underbanked in deprived local communities. They emphasize the long term development of communities and provide loans such as micro-finance or venture capital.

In the United States these became popular after 1994 when the US Congress created community development banks and allowed them to get funding at very low rates from the US treasury.

== In the United States ==
In the United States, community development banks are commercial banks that operate with a mission to generate economic development in low- to moderate-income (LMI) geographical areas and serve residents of these communities. In the United States, community development banks are certified as such by the Community Development Financial Institutions Fund, a department within the U.S. Department of the Treasury.

Organizers wishing to start a new CDB can seek a state or national bank charter. Federally chartered CDBs are regulated primarily by the Office of the Comptroller of the Currency, like any national bank. According to the OCC Charter Licensing Manual, CDBs are required "to lend, invest, and provide services primarily to LMI individuals or communities in which it is chartered to conduct business." State-chartered community development banks are subject to regulations, qualifications, and definitions that vary from state to state.

=== CDFI Certified Banks ===
In order to become a certified Community Development Financial Institution (CDFI), CD Banks must apply to the United States Community Development Financial Institutions Fund. Successful applicants will have a primary mission of promoting community development and principally serve under served markets and provide development services, in addition to meeting other requirements. CDFI Banks provide retail banking services, they usually target customers from "financially underserved" demographics. While community development banks are only one type of community development financial institution, or CDFI, some organizations use the terms interchangeably.

=== Non-certified community development banks ===
Although a very small number of US banks are certified CDFIs, many more may be considered Community Development Banks based on their dedication to supporting local economic development and their focus on a particular underserved community. Minority Depository Institutions (MDIs), also known as Minority Banks, are owned by and serve a socially or economically disadvantaged minority community (designated by the FDIC). Community Development Banking Institution (CDBI) is an alternate designation designed by National Community Investment Fund (NCIF) to identify US banks that locate branches and provide loans in economically distressed communities.

== Notable community development banks ==
One of the best known community development banks was ShoreBank, founded in Chicago in 1973. ShoreBank had branches in Chicago's South and West sides, Cleveland, and Detroit. The bank established subsidiaries that provide equity investing, consulting, and environmental banking services and affiliated nonprofits that provide related financing, technical assistance, and consulting services. ShoreBank and its affiliated companies have projects in 30 countries. Notably, ShoreBank incorporated environmental conservation into its mission during the 1990s. On August 20, 2010, ShoreBank's banking operations were closed by the FDIC, reopening under Urban Partnership Bank.

The Grameen Bank of Bangladesh is a microfinance organization and community development bank founded by Muhammad Yunus. The bank has grown into a family of over two dozen for-profit and nonprofit enterprises including the Grameen Foundation, and the Grameen Bank and its founder were awarded the Nobel Peace Prize in 2006.

Other CDBs in the United States include:

- Beneficial State Bank in Oakland, CA
- Carver Federal Savings Bank in New York, NY
- Central Bank of Kansas City in Kansas City, MO
- City First Bank of D.C. in Washington, D.C.
- First NBC Bank in New Orleans, LA
- Hope Community Credit Union in Jackson, MS
- Liberty Bank & Trust in New Orleans, LA
- Louisville Community Development Bank in Louisville, KY
- Neighborhood National Bank in San Diego, CA
- One PacificCoast Bank in California, Oregon, and Washington
- Southern Bancorp in Arkadelphia, AR
- University National Bank in St. Paul, MN
- OneUnited Bank in Boston, MA

Organizations that support, advocate, and convene Community Development Banks in the US:

- Community Development Bankers Association (CDBA)
- National Community Investment Fund (NCIF)
- The CDFI Fund
