= Financial Health Network =

- Formerly: Center for Financial Services Innovation (CFSI), 2004–2019
- Type: Nonprofit organization
- Industry: Financial services
- Founded: 2004 (origins in a 2002 ShoreBank / Ford Foundation research project)
- Founder: Jennifer Tescher
- Headquarters: Chicago, Illinois, U.S.
- Key people: Jennifer Tescher (Founder & CEO)
- Website: finhealthnetwork.org

The Financial Health Network is an American nonprofit organization focused on improving financial health, headquartered in Chicago. Founded in 2004 as the Center for Financial Services Innovation (CFSI), it initially worked to expand access to financial services for unbanked and underbanked consumers. The organization later broadened its focus to the wider concept of financial health — defined as a household's ability to spend, save, borrow, and plan in ways that enable financial resilience — and adopted its current name in May 2019. It is known for the Financial Health Pulse, an annual research initiative tracking the financial health of United States households, and for its EMERGE Financial Health conference.

== History ==
=== Origins as CFSI (2004–2019) ===
The organization traced its origins to a 2002 research project conducted by a division of ShoreBank for the Ford Foundation, which examined the supply of and demand for financial services among low-income consumers. Jennifer Tescher founded CFSI in 2004 to address the needs of unbanked and underbanked Americans and to encourage the development of technology that widened access to financial services. In its early years, the organization conducted research, awarded grants to nonprofit organizations, and convened an annual industry forum on financial services for underbanked consumers.

==== Financial Solutions Lab (2014–2022) ====
In 2014, CFSI and JPMorgan Chase launched the Financial Solutions Lab, a multi-year initiative providing capital and mentorship to financial technology companies working to improve consumer financial health. American Banker reported that JPMorgan Chase committed $30 million over several years to fund the five-year initiative, which would host tech-focused challenges designed to test and scale innovations aimed at improving Americans' financial health. By 2019, American Banker reported that the initiative had supported more than 30 fintech companies drawn from over 1,600 applicants, that products developed by participating startups had reached 4 million Americans, and that the companies had collectively raised more than $500 million in capital — figures the outlet attributed to a JPMorgan Chase press release. The Financial Solutions Lab was also later supported by Prudential Financial, with solutions focused on addressing acute and persistent financial health challenges faced by low- to moderate-income individuals, Black and Latinx communities, and other underserved consumers.

=== Rebrand to Financial Health Network (2019) ===
In May 2019, CFSI changed its name to the Financial Health Network, a shift the organization said reflected a move in emphasis from financial access toward the broader concept of financial health. The organization stated that the new name better described work spanning sectors beyond financial services — including employers, healthcare, and policy — and reinforced its commitment to connecting and equipping organizations across industries to advance financial health.

== Research and programs ==
=== Financial Health Pulse ===
The Financial Health Network developed the FinHealth Score, a measurement framework, beginning in 2016, and first shared baseline survey results through the Financial Health Pulse in 2018, according to a third-party survey that used the methodology. Since 2018, the Financial Health Network has conducted the Financial Health Pulse, an annual research initiative that tracks how households in the United States spend, save, borrow, and plan. The study draws on probability-based survey responses from the University of Southern California's Understanding America Study combined with administrative financial data, and classifies respondents as Financially Healthy, Financially Coping, or Financially Vulnerable based on eight indicators of financial health.

The annual findings on the share of Financially Healthy U.S. households have been reported by national outlets including CNBC. The Financial Health Pulse 2024 U.S. Trends Report found that around 70 percent of American households remained financially unhealthy, with day-to-day financial health worsening for many households even as confidence in longer-term financial expectations strengthened, according to the Financial Health Network. The initiative has been supported by funders including the Citi Foundation and the Principal Foundation.

=== FinHealth Score ===
The organization developed the FinHealth Score, a framework that assesses household financial health across eight indicators — including whether a household spends less than its income, pays bills on time, holds sufficient short-term savings, holds sufficient long-term savings, carries manageable debt, has a prime credit score, carries adequate insurance, and plans ahead financially. Each indicator is scored using a standardized survey question, and the FinHealth Score is the average of the point values assigned across the eight questions. The Score is used by researchers, financial institutions, and nonprofits to measure and track financial health outcomes. The enterprise licensing of the FinHealth Score is managed by Attune, a for-profit company spun off from the Financial Health Network in 2023 and granted an exclusive license to embed the Score into software products, digital platforms, and commercial applications.

=== FinHealth Standards ===
In June 2025, the Financial Health Network unveiled its first FinHealth Standards at the EMERGE Financial Health conference in San Diego, describing them as the first-ever product design standards for the financial industry. The standards provide voluntary benchmarks for checking accounts and credit cards across three areas: account features, account policies, and customer onboarding and access. They were developed in collaboration with industry leaders and draw on academic and behavioral research, according to the Financial Health Network.

The standards were positioned by the organization as a self-regulatory complement to consumer protection in a period of reduced federal oversight of the financial industry. Founder and CEO Jennifer Tescher said the goal was to give financial providers clarity to act and to build consumer trust. The standards include recommendations such as enabling consumers to choose their credit card payment due dates, expediting fund availability on deposits, and expanding eligibility for fee waivers.

American Banker reported in June 2025 that adoption by financial institutions was limited at the time of launch, and included skeptical commentary from a former senior official at the Consumer Financial Protection Bureau who questioned the efficacy of industry-imposed self-regulatory standards. The organization said subsequent installments would cover savings accounts and other lending products.

=== EMERGE Financial Health ===
The Financial Health Network hosts EMERGE Financial Health (formerly the EMERGE: Financial Health Forum and, earlier, the Underbanked Financial Services Forum), an annual conference convening senior leaders from financial services, fintech, policy, nonprofits, and research. Speakers have included executives from major financial institutions, U.S. financial regulators, and academics. The FinHealth Standards were first unveiled publicly at the EMERGE conference in San Diego in June 2025.

== See also ==
- ShoreBank
- Political and Economic Research Council—a Chapel Hill, NC-based think tank dealing in the same issue area
