= Ron Grzywinski =

- Ron Grzywinski in Chicago in 2006.
- Born: 1936 (age 89–90); Chicago, Illinois
- Occupations: Banker, co-founder of ShoreBank

/

Ron Grzywinski is a community development banker from Chicago, and one of four founders of ShoreBank. In May 2010 he retired as chair of ShoreBank Corporation and took the position of Advisor to the Board of Directors of ShoreBank Corporation.

== Early life and career ==
Ron Grzywinski was born in 1936 in Chicago's South Chicago community area on the city's south side. His banking career began at the First National Bank of Lockport, and he moved to the Hyde Park Bank in 1967.

In 1973, Ron and three colleagues (Milton Davis, James Fletcher, and Mary Houghton) purchased the South Shore Bank (eventually renaming it ShoreBank) in Chicago's South Shore neighborhood to fight redlining. It was America's first community development bank, and it has grown into what is, by most accounts, the most successful community development and microfinance institution in the country. The bank's successful combination of a social mission with profitability finds it frequently cited as "doing well while doing good."

== Work with ShoreBank ==
In 1977, Ron was the only banker to testify in favor of the Community Reinvestment Act which required banks and thrifts meet the credit needs of the communities in which they did business, including low- and middle-income residents. Thanks in part to Ron’s testimony, it was enacted by congress later that year.

In the 1980s Ron worked in Bangladesh with Muhammad Yunus through a grant from the Ford Foundation to help design and incorporate the Grameen Bank.

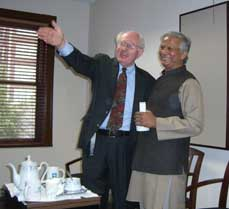
Ron Grzywinski and Muhammad Yunus in Chicago in late 2006.

In 1985, he worked closely with then Arkansas Governor Bill Clinton to set up the Southern Development Bancorporation, a community development bank serving rural Arkansans.

In 1997, Ron helped to launch ShoreBank Pacific, the nation’s first commercial bank formed to support environmentally sustainable development.

Under Ron's stewardship ShoreBank grew into a $1.9 billion bank, helped finance the purchase and renovation of 49,000 affordable housing residences, and issued nearly $900 million in loans to citizens in Chicago, Detroit, and Cleveland between 2001 and 2006.

== Boards and Committees ==
In addition to ShoreBank, Ron works with the boards of the Southern Development Bancorporation in Arkansas, the Grameen Bank and BRAC in Bangladesh, XacBank in Mongolia, the Aga Khan Foundation in Pakistan, and the Ashoka Global Academy in India.

He is a charter member of the Federal Deposit Insurance Corporation's Advisory Committee on Economic Inclusion.

Ron serves on the board of judges for Social Accountability International's Corporate Conscience Awards.

== Awards and honors ==
In 1988, Ron received the Medal for Entrepreneurial Excellence from the Yale School of Management.

In 2001, he was awarded an honorary doctorate by Northern Michigan University.

In 2005, Ron received the John W. Gardner Leadership Award from the Independent Sector recognizing a career that has “transformed underserved neighborhoods into vibrant communities and inspired a community development banking movement worldwide.” Ron was the first person from a for-profit business to win this award.

In 2006, Ron (along with ShoreBank co-founder Mary Houghton) received the Gleitsman Citizen Activist Award at Harvard University for work transforming “under-served urban neighborhoods across the country into vibrant communities.”

In the same year, he accepted the 2006 Ethics Award from Western Illinois University.

Also in 2006, he accepted an invitation to address the Skoll World Forum at Oxford University.

In October 2007, he was named to the Affordable Housing Finance Hall of Fame.

In November 2007, he was named to the list "America's Top Leaders 2007" by U.S. News & World Report.

In 2008, he received the Hesburgh Award for Ethics in Business from the University of Notre Dame.
