= Community development financial institution =

Financial institution in the US and UK

A community development financial institution (US) or community development finance institution (UK) – abbreviated in both cases to CDFI – is a financial institution that provides credit and financial services to underserved markets and populations, primarily in the USA but also in the UK. A CDFI may be a community development bank, a community development credit union (CDCU), a community development loan fund (CDLF), a community development venture capital fund (CDVC), a microenterprise development loan fund, or a community development corporation.

CDFIs are certified by the Community Development Financial Institutions Fund (CDFI Fund) at the U.S. Department of the Treasury, which provides funds to CDFIs through a variety of programs. The number of certified CDFIs increased from 196 at the end of fiscal year 1997 to 1,426 at the end of fiscal year 2024. The CDFI Fund and the legal concept of CDFIs were established by the Riegle Community Development and Regulatory Improvement Act of 1994. Broadly speaking, a CDFI is defined as a financial institution that: has a primary mission of community development, serves a target market, is a financing entity, provides development services, remains accountable to its community, and is a non-governmental entity.

The Housing and Economic Recovery Act of 2008 (HERA) authorized CDFIs certified by the CDFI Fund to become members of the Federal Home Loan Banks. The Final Rule regarding the procedures and standards to be used by the Federal Home Loan Banks to evaluate applications for membership from CDFIs were published in the Federal Register Federal Housing Finance Agency in January 2010. The Final Rule is to be implemented by the 11 Federal Home Loan Banks, each of which will evaluate membership applications independently.

CDFIs are related to, but not identical with, Community Development Entities (CDEs). CDEs are also certified by the CDFI Fund at the U.S. Department of Treasury but have somewhat different qualifications. Many CDFIs have also been certified as CDEs. The primary purpose of CDEs is to utilize the New Markets Tax Credit Program (NMTCs). NMTCs were created to induce equity investments in low-income communities. Traditionally, because of the NMTCs and the structure of the industry, investments in CDFIs were typically limited to larger financial institutions. Investment access to CDFIs appears to be on the rise, as CNote, a company that lets individuals invest their savings in CDFIs, recently received qualification from the Securities and Exchange Commission to offer their CDFI-based product to non-accredited investors.

CDFIs may be subject to oversight by federal financial institution regulators (e.g., banks, credit unions) or may be "unregulated" at the federal level, and subject only to the laws of the states in which they operate. There is no mandatory rating or ranking system imposed on all CDFIs which would allow investors or others to evaluate their performance, safety, or strength. However, since 2004 approximately 100 CDFI loan funds have received voluntary ratings of their financial strength and social impact performance by Aeris, an independent rating and information service. In 2015, Standard & Poor's issued its first ratings assessments of CDFI loan funds.

== Scope ==
In 2006, there were approximately 1,250 CDFIs, consisting of:

- More than 500 community development loan funds;
- More than 350 community development banks;
- More than 290 community development credit unions;
- More than 80 community development venture capital funds.

In May 2010, the CDFI Fund had certified 862 CDFIs, 57 Native CDFIs (serving Native Americans), and 4,230 CDEs, each of which may have multiple subsidiary investment funds.

Nationwide, over 1,000 CDFIs serve economically distressed communities by providing credit, capital, and financial services that are often unavailable from mainstream financial institutions. CDFIs have loaned and invested billions of dollars in the most distressed communities in the United States, leveraging capital from the private sector for development activities in low wealth communities across the nation.

While there are numerous organizations certified as CDFIs by the CDFI Fund, it is believed that there are thousands of financial institutions serving the needs of low-income people or communities in the United States, that either have not applied for CDFI status or have otherwise not been able to fulfill all of the requirements for formal CDFI certification.

In fiscal year 2016, CDFI program awardees originated $3.6 billion in loans and investments to finance more than 13,000 businesses and 33,000 affordable housing units.

== Notable depository CDFIs ==
ShoreBank, headquartered in the South Shore neighborhood of Chicago, was founded in 1973. By 2007, it had over $2 billion in assets. ShoreBank had branches in Chicago’s South and West sides, Cleveland, and Detroit, but in August 2010 the bank was declared insolvent and its branches were taken over by Urban Partnership Bank. Its holding company ShoreBank Corporation, still exists and promotes its community development mission through affiliates in Oregon and Washington state, and in Michigan’s Upper Peninsula. ShoreBank’s international consulting services had offices in Chicago, Washington, D.C., and London, and provided consulting services in over 60 countries around the world.

OneUnited Bank, headquartered in Boston, Massachusetts, is the largest African-American-owned CDFI in the country, with branches in Boston, Miami, Florida, and Los Angeles, California.

The Center for Community Self-Help, another leading CDFI, was founded in 1980 in Durham, North Carolina. Self-Help's home and business lending has provided low-wealth, minority, rural and female borrowers with over $5.24 billion in financing. Much of this is through Self-Help's national secondary market program, which enables conventional lenders to make more home loans to low-wealth families. Self-Help also develops commercial and residential real estate and operates retail credit unions. In response to predatory lenders increasingly targeting family wealth in poor and minority communities, Self-Help in 1999 worked with the NAACP, AARP, and other North Carolina groups to form the Coalition for Responsible Lending and help enact one of the United States' first laws to curb predatory mortgage lending. In 2002, Self-Help founded the Center for Responsible Lending, a nonprofit, nonpartisan research and policy organization that recommends solutions to predatory lending abuses.

== Notable non-depository CDFIs ==
- Capital Impact Partners
- Chicago Community Loan Fund
- Enterprise Community Partners
- Local Initiatives Support Corporation
- ShoreBank
- Southern Bancorp

== Other countries ==
While the CDFI Fund and its certifications are limited to the United States, the UK also has about 70 CDFIs and a trade association, Responsible Finance, formerly known as the Community Development Finance Association (CDFA). The UK government has provided various funding initiatives for CDFIs and credit unions, and Community Investment Tax Relief (somewhat similar to New Markets Tax Credit) is available on investments in accredited CDFIs.

Institutions similar in purpose exist around the world, such as Grameen Bank in Bangladesh and Clann Credo in Ireland, though they are not generally called CDFIs, but are described by other terms such as microfinance institutions or social banks or social investment funds.

== See also ==
- Community land trust
