= ShoreBank =

Community development bank (1973–2010)

ShoreBank (SBK)
- Type: Community development bank
- Founded: 1973; 53 years ago
- Defunct: 2010; 16 years ago
- Fate: Insolvency
- Successor: Urban Partnership Bank
- Headquarters: Chicago, Illinois
- Key people: Milton Davis; James Fletcher; Ron Grzywinski; Mary Houghton; George Surgeon
- Products: Financial services, microfinance
- Total assets: $2.6B USD (2008)
- Parent: ShoreBank Corporation
- Website: SBK.com (Archive.org)

ShoreBank was a community development bank founded and headquartered in Chicago. At the time of its closing it was the oldest and largest such institution, and in 2008 had $2.6 billion in assets. It was owned by ShoreBank Corporation, a regulated bank holding company.

ShoreBank had branches in Chicago's South and West sides, Cleveland, and Detroit. Between 2000 and 2006, ShoreBank issued nearly $900 million in loans to citizens in Chicago, Detroit, and Cleveland. ShoreBank and its affiliated companies had projects in 30 countries.

ShoreBank incorporated environmental conservation into its mission during the 1990s, helping develop a triple bottom line approach to banking, equally prioritizing profits, impact on people, and the impact of a project on the environment. At that time it established ShoreBank Pacific based in Portland, Oregon.

ShoreBank accepted mission-based deposits from across the country through its Development Deposits program, launched in 1982, and its online savings account ShoreBank Direct, launched in 2007.

Although mission-based, the bank's financial performance historically matched or exceeded that of its peer banks. However, the bank faced significant losses in 2009, and as of May 2010, was seeking $200 million in additional capital from major investors and the U.S. government. The bank's losses were related to the recession, though it was not engaged in subprime lending. In the spring of 2010, ShoreBank raised over $150MM in private equity to recapitalize the bank. However, no action was taken on its application for $70MM in Troubled Asset Relief Program funds which it was fully eligible to receive. The combination would have been enough to allow the bank time to work through its troubled loan portfolio.

ShoreBank Corporation was the first bank holding company to combine commercial banking, real estate development, nonprofit loan funds, and international advisory services aimed at community development. Originally developed as a neighborhood development bank for low-income African-American communities, ShoreBank eventually expanded nationally and internationally.

It exceeded its goal of private capital commitments but did not receive requested government support, a condition of the private investors. In August 2010, the bank faced possible insolvency and risked having its deposits taken over by the Federal Deposit Insurance Corporation, which insured its deposits. On August 20, 2010, the bank was declared insolvent, closed by regulators and most of its assets were acquired by Urban Partnership Bank. Some of the more recent management hirees of ShoreBank, in an unprecedented move by the FDIC, were allowed to continue to run the restructured bank, now a part of Urban Partnership Bank. According to the FDIC, the recent hirees "did not contribute to the bank's problems." Sheila Bair, head of the U.S. Federal Deposit Insurance Corporation, devoted several pages to the lack of federal support in her 2012 book and commented that the FDIC sought approval of the injection of federal funds several times, to no avail.

== Origin ==
A ShoreBank branch in Chicago's Bronzeville neighborhood

In 1973 the South Shore Bank attempted to relocate from 71st Street and Jeffery Boulevard in the economically declining South Shore to the Loop. At the time, one third of all apartment buildings in South Shore were tax-delinquent and in danger of abandonment by landlords. Angered by the bank's racist lending practices, community banker-activists Milton Davis, James Fletcher, Mary Houghton, and Ron Grzywinski purchased the bank after successfully petitioning the federal Comptroller of the Currency to stop the move after creating the Illinois Neighborhood Development Corporation. Urban planner Stanley Hallett was a founding board member and was vice president of the bank's holding company its first five years.

Renamed ShoreBank in 2000, it was the nation's first community development bank. During its 37 years of operation, ShoreBank played a critical role in stabilizing and rebuilding many of Chicago's low-income neighborhoods and eventually expanded globally, setting the standard for the development finance industry.

As its range of financial products grew, so did its geographic reach and influence in the banking industry. ShoreBank expanded into low-income communities in Detroit, Cleveland, Michigan's Upper Peninsula, Arkansas, and the Pacific Northwest. Its influence in Arkansas influenced Bill Clinton, then governor to propose the Community Development Financial Institutions Act, which he signed in 1994. In addition, ShoreBank executives assisted in the development of the international microfinance industry. After the collapse of the Berlin Wall, the corporation's consulting affiliate, ShoreBank Advisory Services, assisted banks in Russia and Eastern Europe with small business lending.

== Structure ==
A ShoreBank branch on Mack Avenue in Detroit

ShoreBank Corporation is the holding company for and with ShoreBank. Its other subsidiaries provided banking, equity investing, consulting, and environmental banking services:

- ShoreBank Pacific in Oregon and Washington state. On August 21, 2010, it was announced that ShoreBank Corporation had entered into an agreement to sell ShoreBank Pacific to OneCalifornia Bank of Oakland, California. The acquisition completed in December 2011 and the resulting entity was rebranded eventually to Beneficial State Bank.
- ShoreBank International, is now a part of Palladium Impact Capital.
- ShoreCap Management

ShoreBank established a number of affiliated nonprofits to provide related financing, technical assistance, and consulting services:

- Center for Financial Services Innovation, now named Financial Health Network
- National Community Investment Fund (NCIF)
- Northern Initiatives, in Michigan's Upper Peninsula. On August 20, 2010, Northern Initiatives announced that it had amended its by-laws to end appointment of board members by ShoreBank and that it would continue its operations independently of the Chicago-based bank.
- ShoreBank Enterprise Cascadia in Oregon and Washington state announced it would change its name to Enterprise Cascadia on August 20, 2010, and would continue its operations independently of the Chicago-based bank. In 2013 Enterprise Cascadia rebranded as Craft3. Their new name reflects their focus on the "'three bottom lines' of economic, environmental and social equity."
- ShoreBank Enterprise Cleveland. On August 20, 2010, it was announced that ShoreBank Enterprise Cleveland was changing its name to Enterprise Cleveland (EC) and would continue its operations independently of the Chicago-based bank. In 2018, the Cuyahoga Land Bank acquired the enterprise center.
- ShoreBank Enterprise Detroit. It was announced that ShoreBank Enterprise Detroit would be changing its name to Enterprise Detroit and would continue its operations independently of the Chicago-based bank. In 2011, the name changed to Detroit Development Fund.
- ShoreBank Neighborhood Institute
- ShoreCap Exchange, now named CapitalPlus Exchange

== Recognition ==
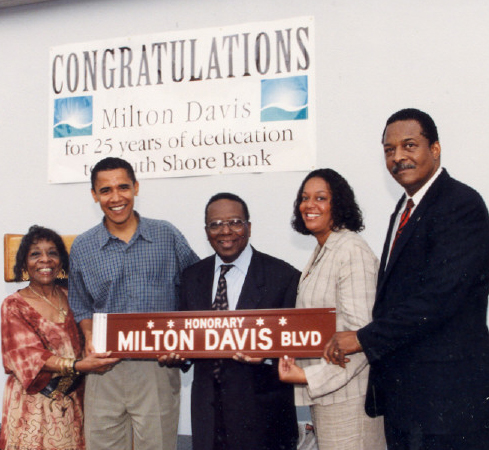
State Senator Barack Obama and others celebrate the naming of a street in Chicago after ShoreBank co-founder Milton Davis in 1998.

ShoreBank, its co-founders, and its affiliates have received numerous awards and honors, including from the magazines Fast Company, Business Ethics, and U.S. News & World Report, University of Notre Dame's Mendoza College of Business, the Independent Community Bankers of America, Mayor Richard M. Daley of Chicago, the Chicagoland Chamber of Commerce, and Governor Ted Kulongoski of Oregon. In 2023, the founders of ShoreBank (Ron Grzywinski, Mary Houghton, and posthumously Jim Fletcher and Milton Davis, received the Ned Gramllich lifetime Achievement Award for Responsible Finance from Opportunity Finance Network.

Former President and Arkansas Governor Bill Clinton is a prominent supporter of the bank. In 1985, ShoreBank worked closely with Clinton to set up the Southern Development Bancorporation, a community development bank serving rural Arkansans. Clinton described ShoreBank as "the most important bank in America" and credited ShoreBank's success with inspiring a movement of community development financial institutions (CDFIs).

Under a grant from the Ford Foundation in the 1980s, ShoreBank worked with Muhammad Yunus to advise him on the growth of Grameen Bank in Bangladesh. Yunus and Grameen Bank were awarded the Nobel Peace Prize in 2006. Later, it worked with BRAC, a second large Bangladeshi organization.

== Loan Portfolio Troubles ==
In 2010 ShoreBank had a troubled asset ratio of 300% compared to a national average for all banks of 15%. Unemployment in many of the neighborhoods where the bank did business rose to as much as 50%; property values fell by 30%. The bank relied heavily on cash flow financing for multifamily buildings. As unemployment spiked beyond levels ever seen before, tenants struggled to pay rent; vacancies increased and landlords got behind in their loan payments. The single family portfolio was also negatively impacted and delinquency rates went higher than historical levels. Once homeowners secured new jobs they quickly came to the bank to refinance. Nine times out of ten the homeowners were laid off from full time jobs with benefits and found multiple part time jobs to provide the income needed to save their house.

After insolvency the new bank was recapitalized through loss-share guarantees from the FDIC and a $367.7 million loss taken by the FDIC insurance fund, and nearly $140 million was invested by Goldman Sachs, Citigroup, JP Morgan Chase, Morgan Stanley and Bank of America. There were no other cases in which large banks lined up to recapitalize a failing bank. In an unusual move the FDIC lawsuit against the bank did not name co-founders, top executives or board members. The new management team of the former ShoreBank was allowed by the FDIC to run the newly formed Urban Partnership Bank. Although ShoreBank's President William Farrow was brought on after regulators ordered ShoreBank to raise additional capital, it is not standard practice for the FDIC to resell a bank to the managers who ran the failed bank.
