= There Goes the Neighborhood (book) =

2006 book by William Julius Wilson and Richard Taub

There Goes the Neighborhood: Racial, Ethnic, and Class Tensions in Four Chicago Neighborhoods and Their Meaning for America
- First edition
- Author: William Julius Wilson & Richard Taub
- Language: English
- Subject: Social structure
- Genre: Non-fiction
- Publisher: Knopf
- Publication date: 2006
- Publication place: United States
- Media type: Paperback
- Pages: 226 pp
- ISBN: 978-0-679-72418-6 (Paperback)
- OCLC: 180945581

There Goes the Neighborhood: Racial, Ethnic, and Class Tensions in Four Chicago Neighborhoods and Their Meaning for America by William Julius Wilson and Richard Taub was written in 2006 and is an investigation about racial, ethnic and class tensions in four Chicago neighborhoods. The four neighborhoods, Beltway, Dover, Archer Park, and Groveland are found on the South Side and West Side of Chicago (fictitious names were chosen to protect their identities). Beltway was chosen as being the white neighborhood, Dover as being the white neighborhood in transition, Archer Park as being the Latino neighborhood, and Groveland as being the African-American neighborhood.

== Synopsis ==
=== Chapter 1 ===
In this chapter, the authors talk about their choice in choosing the four neighborhoods. They chose neighborhoods that were of working and lower middle class in order to represent the ordinary Americans and explained that these neighborhoods were populated by different ethnic groups. One thing that they all had in common was the growing Latino population. Moreover, the investigation was carried on because they wanted to fully understand what produced or prevented the "tipping point" (a rapid ethnic turnover). The research depended on an ethnographic approach which consisted of a team of nine graduate student research assistants at the University of Chicago. The study was done over a period of 3 years, from January 1993 to September 1995. The book mentions Albert O. Hirschman's theory of exit, voice and loyalty. It also provides statistics about the population by race and Hispanic origin from 1980 to 2000. This chapter talks about the change in racial history in Chicago and the cause of white flight early on (civil rights). The other chapters will focus on the resident's perception of other races.

=== Chapter 2: Beltway-–Predominantly White ===
(Written with the collaboration of Patrick J. Carr and Maria J. Kefalas)

Beltway was the destination for those whites who chose the exit method because their cities were experiencing ethnic turnover. The reason they moved to Beltway was because they wanted bigger houses for their families. Beltway was the furthest from downtown Chicago and the most isolated out of the other 3 cities.

Chapter two focuses around the community of Beltway which is the farthest and most isolated from Chicago out of the four communities investigated in this book. Beltway residents felt that they were driven out of the main city by minorities and this neighborhood is one that portrays the right values and makeup. Beltway was predominantly white (95%) in 1980 but recently the Latino and African-American populations have begun to swell. This has led to racial riots and confrontation around the neighborhood. As a big picture the community of beltway seems to be incredibly racist but in actuality there is an internal conflict between the residents. The Beltway Civic League (BCL) is a committee made up of mostly older white residents who are trying to "preserve the ways of the past." This group believes that minorities are ruining the fabric of the town and will drive all the whites away. On the other side is the Garland Parents Alliance (GPA) which is a group of younger people whose focus is not the minorities' presence but the overall quality of education and services offered to all residents regardless of color. Through strong social organization the BCL has kept the neighborhood of Beltway from experiencing "white-flight" but a gradual exit of white residents is slowly occurring.

=== Chapter 3: Dover—A mixed ethnic community in transition ===
(Written with the collaboration of Chenoa Flippen and Jolyon Wurr)

The chapter begins about how the neighborhood of Dover was a very tight knit community. It was mainly people from Eastern Europe that had immigrated that over-populated the community. The people spoke about how the children used to run around and play and the parents never had to worry about them because if they did anything wrong the parents would know before they even returned home because another parent would discipline them.

The neighborhood began to change when large numbers of Hispanics moved in and started to overpopulate the community. The neighborhood began to experience higher crime rates and the school system began to go downhill with over populated classrooms. The school system decided to start busing students out to other neighborhoods that had the extra space. These were not very nice neighborhoods and were predominantly African American. The parents began to get extremely upset and held many PTA meetings to discuss how they could fix this situation. They asked for more schools to be built within the community but it was not within the budget. So they then asked that the local magnet school take students from Dover before taking students from other neighborhoods.

An issue that became very significant to the original Dover community members was the issue of language. The current Dover residents had learned English when they immigrated over and thought that the new Hispanic residents should be doing the same. The new residents were in no hurry to learn the language and this caused great tension within the community.

With the increasing crime rate and the population of the community drastically changing the community was experiencing major changes. The community groups that were there to hold events such as monthly meetings at local restaurants to discuss how to better the community was losing members and would eventually have to end the tradition. The original members of Dover were slowly moving or aging and the only people moving in were Hispanics. With the decline of the community traditions such as the award to who has the nicest yard and who is the most involved has led to great dislike from original Dover members. The residents did not like the disrespect they were getting from the new group of people moving in. Loud music and parties were becoming a common occurrence. Also graffiti and trash were being seen all over the city that once held great pride in how clean and safe it was.

From the community dislike of the new neighbor's people began to slowly move away and leave the neighborhood to continue to go downhill.

=== Chapter 4: Archer Park—A taste of Mexico in Chicago ===
(Written with the collaboration of Erin Augis, Jennifer L. Johnson, and Jennifer Pashup)

In this chapter, it talks about how the city has drastically changed with the rise of Latinos. Mexicans began arriving in significant numbers in the 1970s. Archer Park now has shops specializing in Mexican Products and array of street vendors. Language proves as a barrier because Spanish is essentially their first language. The white residents who chose the exit method, felt bitter and lost because of the rise in Hispanic residents. Those who chose the loyalty method feel that the community is unsafe and (102). Mexicans come to Archer Park to make money with intentions of going back to Mexico but they end up making a living and not leaving causing a rise in the number of immigrants. As a result, the neighborhood is filled with litter and graffiti and there is a lack of community organizational life and leadership. The result showed that neighbors do not care about knowing each other. Just as in Dover, Mexicans expressed resentment towards black because they associated darker skin with poverty. Busing and competition for public recreational space were also issues that created conflicts between these two ethnic groups. Archer Park remains a strong Mexican enclave and exclave due to the rapid and continuous number of immigrants.

=== Chapter 5: - Groveland—A stable African American community ===
(Written with the collaboration of Reuben A. Buford May and Mary Pattillo)

In this chapter, the authors talk about Groveland's ethnic history. It used to be predominantly a white neighborhood but years later, whites became the minority in this city. This chapter talks about how blacks used to get beaten up and tortured by whites. Even so, Groveland's violence rate was not as high as the other neighborhoods. After World War II, whites started to move out of Groveland and since it is located around 6 miles from the original Black Belt, blacks did not move in until 1960. The residents have demonstrated enthusiasm to keep the neighborhood clean and free from violence and so far they have proved to have done a great job. In this chapter, the authors talk about block clubs and social organizations that helped the community keep the status of the neighborhood; graffiti free and good sanitation. The statistics showed that in 1980, 59% of the population in Groveland was employed and that by 2000 the percentage had increased to 65. Groveland is different from the other cities previously mentioned because the number of citizens had decreased instead of increased. It also showed black identity and how they inspired and kept this concept going through schools. Groveland did not show any racial tensions, the residents were welcoming and accepting. The reason why Groveland did not experience racism was because it did not experience an "influx of other ethnic groups" (page 143) and blacks were therefore the only ones in control. Groveland was particular because the children were raised as "white people bring up kids" and the younger generation tried keeping racial boundary by rebelling against their parents.

The blacks had a certain degree of resentment against the whites of the neighborhood. and it shows in the different comments gathered throughout the research. Moreover, within the group of friends, crossing boundaries was especially common with those who had jobs because language was an issue. One good example of racial boundaries is when one of the kids "crosses boundaries by using standard English at the office and black English at the park". "The community's unemployment rate rose from 4 to 12 percent from 1970 to 1990, and the proportion of families with incomes below the poverty line grew 5 to 12 percent." This showed that the in migration of lower income families made Groveland more diverse but it also resulted in a higher rate of unemployment. However, Groveland is a good example of loyalty because most of the residents stayed together through thick and thin and worked on making the neighborhood a better place to be by including whites and white attitudes even though tensions among them were present. They portrayed voice rather than exit with the help of block clubs.

=== Chapter 6- Neighborhood racial conflict and social policy dilemmas ===
Although people often refer to the America as a Melting pot, the data found in surveying the four different cities of Chicago suggest that neighborhoods in urban America have a very good chance of being segregated racially and culturally. In some groups, there is voluntary division even after contact is established and for other groups, the separation is forced. There is added friction between blacks and Latinos because the two groups often compete for the same resources. Problems in the communities extend beyond race into issues of Social class as well. For example, residents in Beltway felt that their white neighborhoods were becoming minority enclaves. However, Beltway has still practiced the loyalty method in contrast with the city of Dover who largely chose the exit option. For Archer Park, issues of loyalty do not remain much of an issue because they expressed the least concern over ethnic change and distinguished themselves as a "stepping stone" community. Nonetheless, Groveland appeared the most loyal than any of the neighborhoods, in which only a few families chose the exit method. Consequently, the stronger the social organization of the neighborhood, the more likely it is that individuals will choose the voice option. On the other hand, neighbors who feel that the resources are insufficient with the ethnic change are more likely to choose the exit option and are more apt to reach the "tipping point" (rapid ethnic turnover) quicker. This book illuminates how the three methods; exit, voice, and loyalty can either make or break a community. Also, studies show that when people believe they need one another to overcome a situation, they are more likely to overcome their prejudices and join. This book essentially comes to the conclusion that in order for integrated neighborhoods to become united, they need to start working towards coalition building.
