= Community and Family Services International =

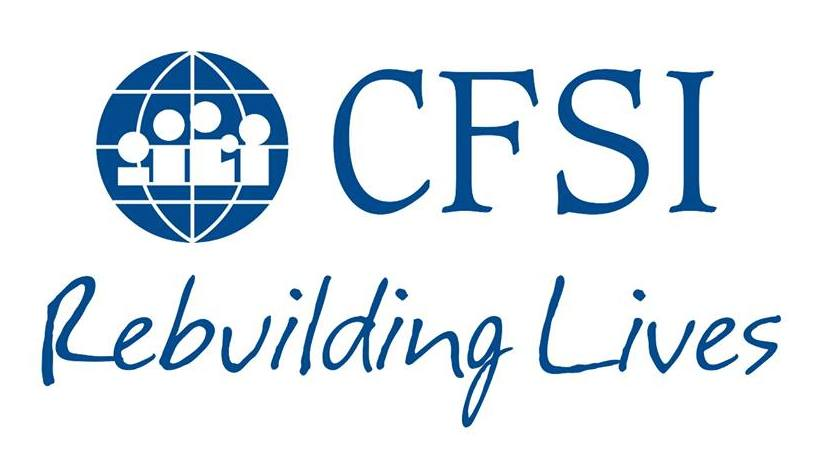
- Founded: 01 June 1981
- Type: International non-governmental organization
- Headquarters: Pasay, Philippines
- Field: Humanitarianism
- Chairperson: Narcisa Escaler
- Executive Director: Steven Muncy
- Website: cfsi.ph

Community and Family Services International (CFSI) is an international humanitarian organisation, based and founded in Philippines in the early 1980s to promote peace and social development, with a particular interest in psychosocial care. The populations of primary concern are refugees, internally displaced persons, survivors of disasters, and others in exceptionally difficult circumstances in the Asia-Pacific Region. As a non-profit organisation, CFSI relies solely on funding and donations from organisations and generous individuals to continue their services to provide humanitarian assistance to beneficiaries, both in the Philippines and abroad. The organisation is registered to the Securities and Exchange Commission in the Philippines, and the headquarters is in Pasay.

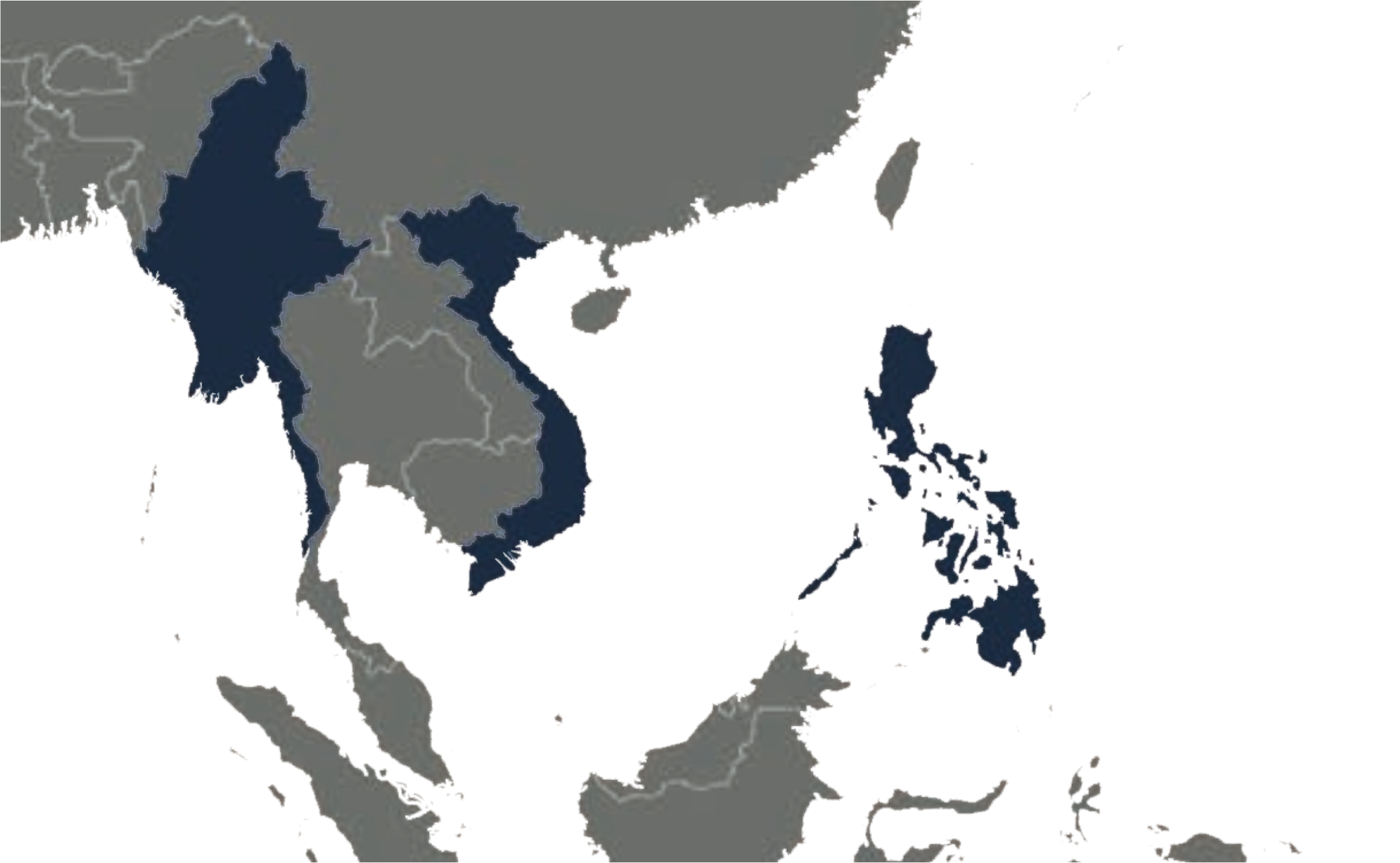
CFSI countries of operation in 2014

Established on 1 June 1981, CFSI started as the Community Mental Health Services, originally helping the Vietnamese refugees in Bataan. It has since worked closely with the international community as well as national and local actors responsible for uprooted persons in the Philippines, Hong Kong, Indonesia, Malaysia, Thailand, Vietnam, Cambodia, Myanmar (Burma), Timor-Leste (East Timor), New Zealand, and Papua New Guinea.

At present, CFSI is carrying out activities in the Philippines, Myanmar, and Viet Nam. CFSI also provides training in various parts of the world for humanitarian workers, social services personnel, human rights specialists, and journalists covering humanitarian emergencies. The tagline of CFSI is Rebuilding Lives.
