= Beneficial State Bank =

American community development bank

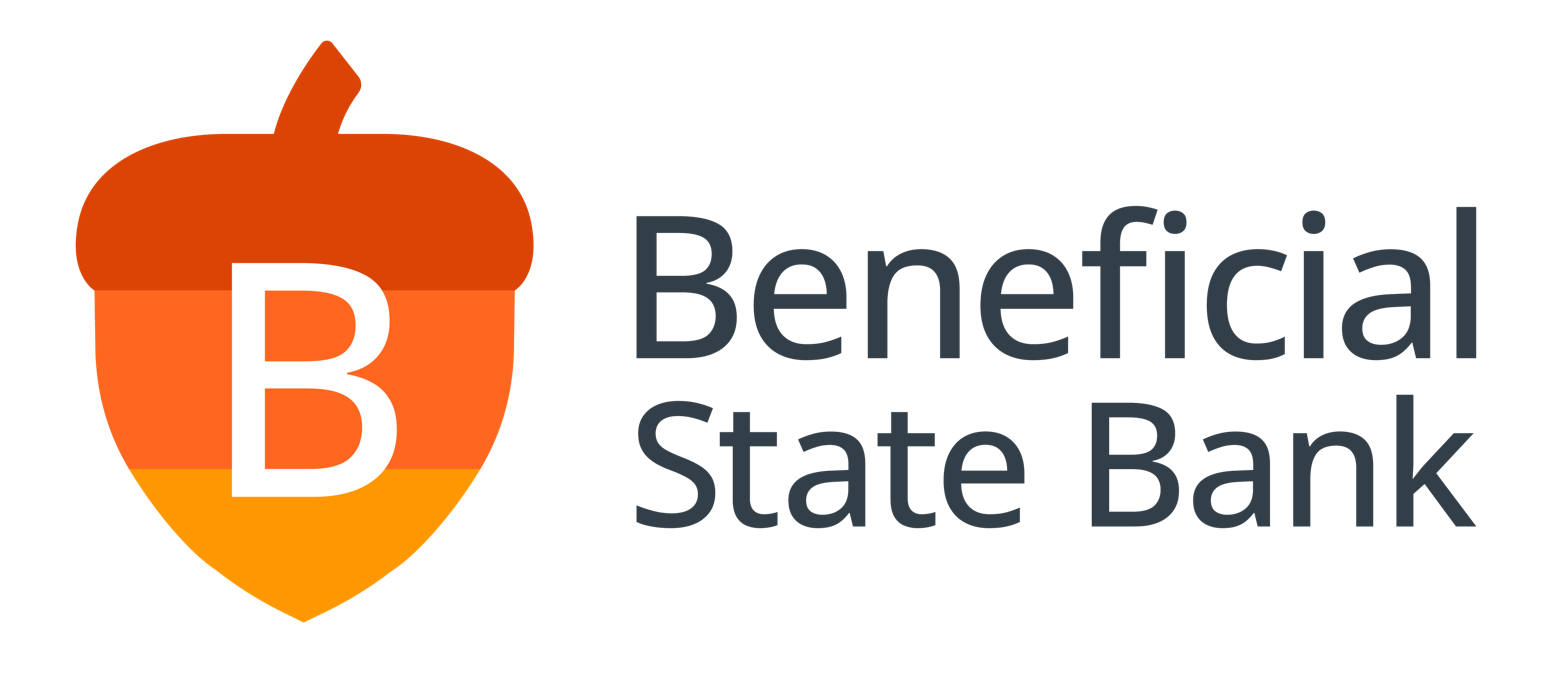

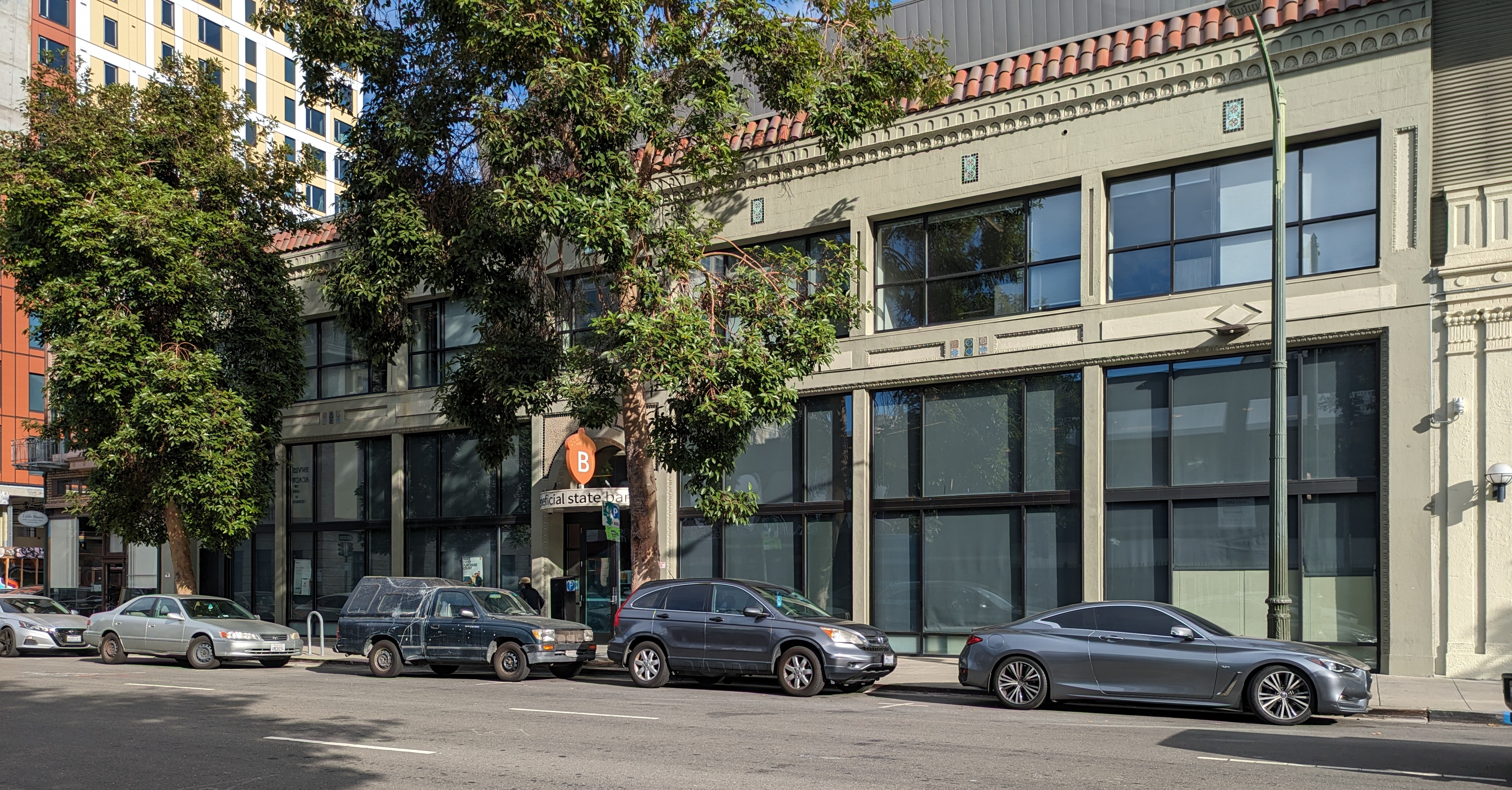
- Type: Private
- Industry: Banking
- Founded: 2007
- Headquarters: Oakland, California, U.S.
- Number of locations: 9 (2026)
- Area served: California, Oregon, Washington
- Key people: Tom Steyer; Kat Taylor (co-chair, co-founder); Shamara van der Voort (Interim CEO)
- Products: Financial services
- Total assets: ▲US$2.03 billion (June 30, 2026)
- Number of employees: 270 (2026)
- Website: beneficialstatebank.com

Beneficial State Bank (formerly One PacificCoast Bank, FSB; and OneCalifornia Bank) is an Oakland, California-based community development bank. The bank was founded in 2007 by billionaire philanthropist and former presidential candidate Tom Steyer and his wife Kat Taylor, to provide loans and banking services to individuals in low wealth communities, including entrepreneurs and existing businesses.

== History ==
In June 2007, Tom Steyer and his wife Kat Taylor founded a charitable foundation, OneCalifornia Foundation, with $22.5 million. As part of the foundation, they formed OneCalifornia Bank as a non-profit community bank. Their goal when founding the bank and foundation was to finance non-profit organizations, and ensure profits were reinvested in the community.

In August 2010, the bank signed an agreement to acquire ShoreBank Pacific, a Ilwaco, Washington-based community bank, and subsidiary of Shorebank Chicago. Together the merged banks would have $300 million in combined assets and serve California, Oregon and Washington. As part of the acquisition, OneCalifornia Bank changed its name to One PacificCoast Bank.

In January 2013, One PacificCoast Bancorp announced plans to acquire 90% of the stock of Portland, Oregon-based Albina Community Bank. In September, the Federal Reserve's Board of Governors approved One PacificCoast Bancorp and its parent One PacificCoast Foundation's request for One PacificCoast Bank, FSB and newly acquired Albina Community Bank to merge. The merger was completed in October.

In July 2014, One PacificCoast Bank rebranded to become Beneficial State Bank, to reflect the bank's stated purpose to pursue "economic justice and environmental sustainability". The parent foundation was renamed to Beneficial State Foundation.

== Products and services ==
Beneficial State Bank functions as a regulated financial institution, and provides commercial banking services to underserved small and medium-size businesses, nonprofits, affordable-housing developers, community facilities, as well as families and individuals in California, Washington State and Oregon.

Beneficial State Bank's services and products available to individuals include money market accounts; and savings and checking accounts.

Business services and products include checking accounts; money market accounts; online cash management; and commercial lending including lines of credit, term loans, commercial real estate loans and loans guaranteed by the Small Business Association.

Beneficial State Bank also provides banking products and services for non-profit organizations, including checking and savings accounts; assistance bridging capital campaigns; financing facilities and real estate; money market accounts; managing deposits and payments; and CDARS, the Certificate of Deposit Account Registry Service, which allows qualified organizations to invest up to $50 million and be eligible for FDIC insurance on every dollar.

The Bank lends to multiple nonprofit organizations and businesses, and helps them with cash management services intended to increase administrative and operational efficiency.

== Operations ==
The bank maintains a triple bottom line, seeking to be profitable, promote environmental sustainability and expand economic opportunity in underserved communities. Banking services are integrated with financial literacy, technical assistance and business education provided by provided by Beneficial State Bank and Beneficial State Foundation. All of the non-voting economic shares of the Bank's holding company are held by the Beneficial State Foundation. 100% of the voting shares are held by Taylor and Steyer. Beneficial State Foundation is overseen by an independent board.

== External sources ==
- Official website
