= Community Development Financial Institutions Fund =

Fund promoting economic revitalization in the U.S.

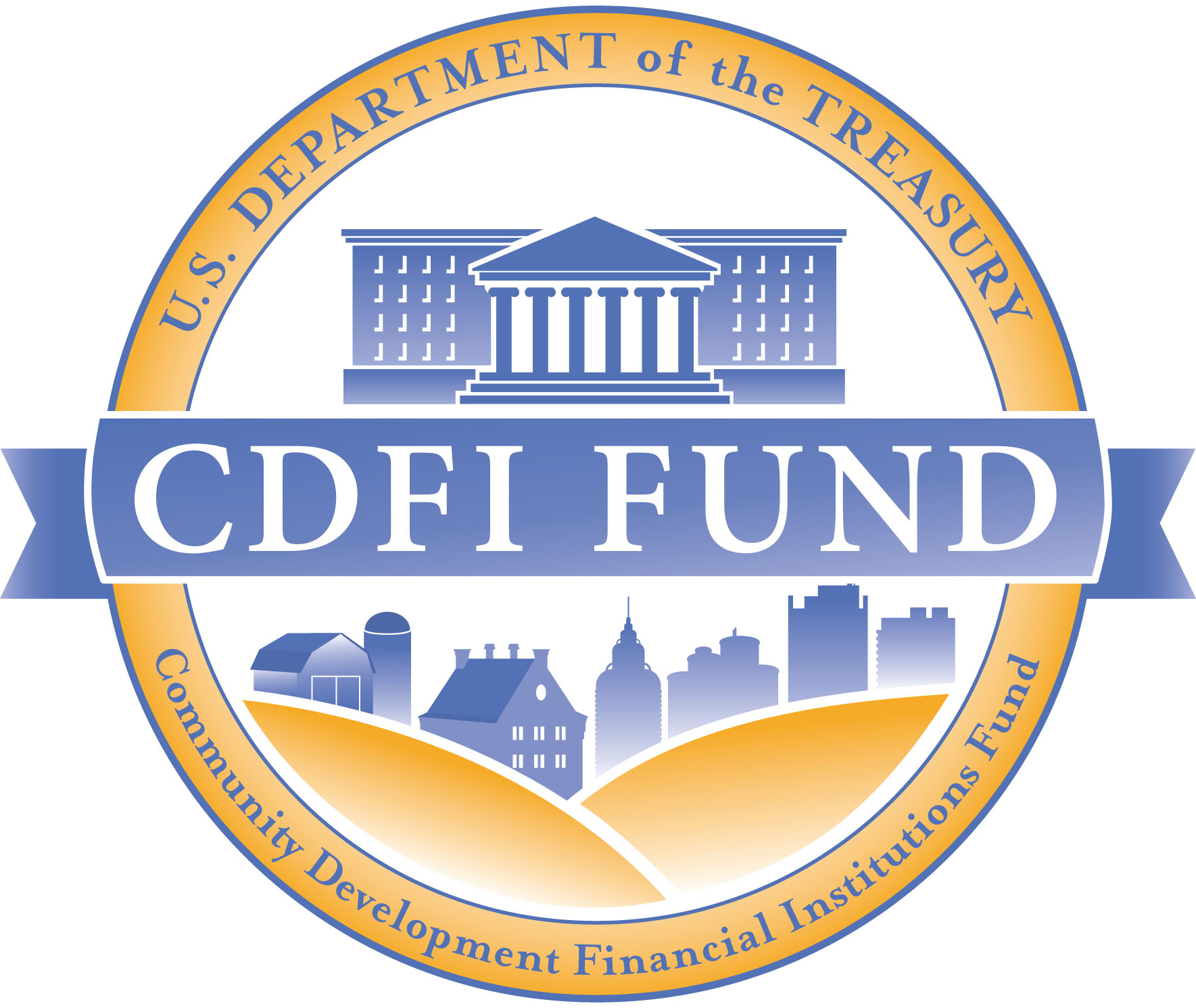

Agency overview
- Formed: 1994; 32 years ago
- Annual budget: 324 million USD (FY 2024)
- Agency executive: Pravina Raghavan, Director
- Parent department: United States Department of the Treasury
- Website: cdfifund.gov

The Community Development Financial Institutions Fund (CDFI Fund) promotes economic revitalization in distressed communities throughout the United States by providing financial assistance and information to community development financial institutions (CDFI). The CDFI Fund was originally established as an independent government corporation through the Riegle Community Development and Regulatory Improvement Act of 1994. Congress promptly moved the CDFI Fund under United States Department of the Treasury in a 1995 reconciliation bill. Financial institutions, which may include banks, credit unions, loan funds, and community development venture capital funds, can apply to the CDFI Fund for formal certification as a CDFI.

In March 2025, President Trump issued an executive order that directed that the CDFI Fund be eliminated "to the maximum extent consistent with applicable law", along with several other agencies.

== History ==
As of September 1, 2005, there were 747 certified CDFIs in the U.S. The CDFI Fund offers a variety of financial programs to provide capital to CDFIs, such as the Financial Assistance Program, Technical Assistance Program, Bank Enterprise Award Program, and the New Markets Tax Credit Program.

== See also ==
- Title 12 of the Code of Federal Regulations
