= I-GO =

Chicago-based car sharing organization

- Company type: Not-for-profit
- Industry: Car rental
- Founded: 2002 in Chicago, Illinois
- Founder: Center for Neighborhood Technology
- Defunct: May 2013
- Fate: Sold to Enterprise Holdings
- Successor: Enterprise CarShare
- Headquarters: Chicago, Illinois, United States
- Area served: Chicago, Illinois
- Services: Carsharing
- Owner: Enterprise Holdings
- Website: www.igocars.org

I-GO was a Chicago-based car sharing organization which is owned by Enterprise Holdings. It was established in 2002 by the Center for Neighborhood Technology as an independent 501(c)(3) not-for-profit organization working in the fields of urban livability and sustainability. I-GO was sold to Enterprise Holdings in May 2013 and re-branded as Enterprise CarShare.

== History ==
- 2001: I-GO is created by the Center for Neighborhood Technology as the first car sharing organization in the Chicago market.
- 2002: I-GO begins operations as a pilot project with six cars.
- April 2005: I-GO begins its suburban expansion, placing cars in Evanston, Illinois.
- August 2008: I-GO and eight other leading non-profit and independent North American car sharing organizations adopt a code of ethics to specify standards and strengthen the industry.
- October 2008: I-GO membership reaches 10,000.
- January 2009: I-GO establishes a joint smart card with the Chicago Transit Authority, allowing I-GO members to access CTA buses and trains using a single card.
- April 2009: Two plug-in hybrid electric vehicles are added to I-GO fleet; the joint effort between I-GO and ComEd is formally recognized by Governor Quinn.
- May 2013: I-GO is sold to Enterprise Holdings in order to expand.

== Stated mission ==
I-GO’s stated mission was to reduce car ownership rates, decrease transportation costs, reduce urban congestion, and improve air quality in Chicago. It focuses on a convenient and economic way to commute without having to own a car and to reduce vehicle miles travelled and greenhouse gas emissions.

== Operations ==
I-GO had cars located in approximately 30 Chicago neighborhoods. I-GO members reserved a vehicle online or by calling its customer service. Members could also create and modify their reservations using smartphones. Once a reservation had been created, the member accesses the reserved car using a member card. As of June 2009, I-GO had more than 12,000 members and 185 cars available for use.

The average fuel efficiency of I-GO's fleet was 35 miles per gallon, and the fleet was composed of low-emission vehicles. Approximately 40% of the fleet were hybrid vehicles and plug-in hybrid electric vehicles.

== Plug-in hybrid electric vehicles ==
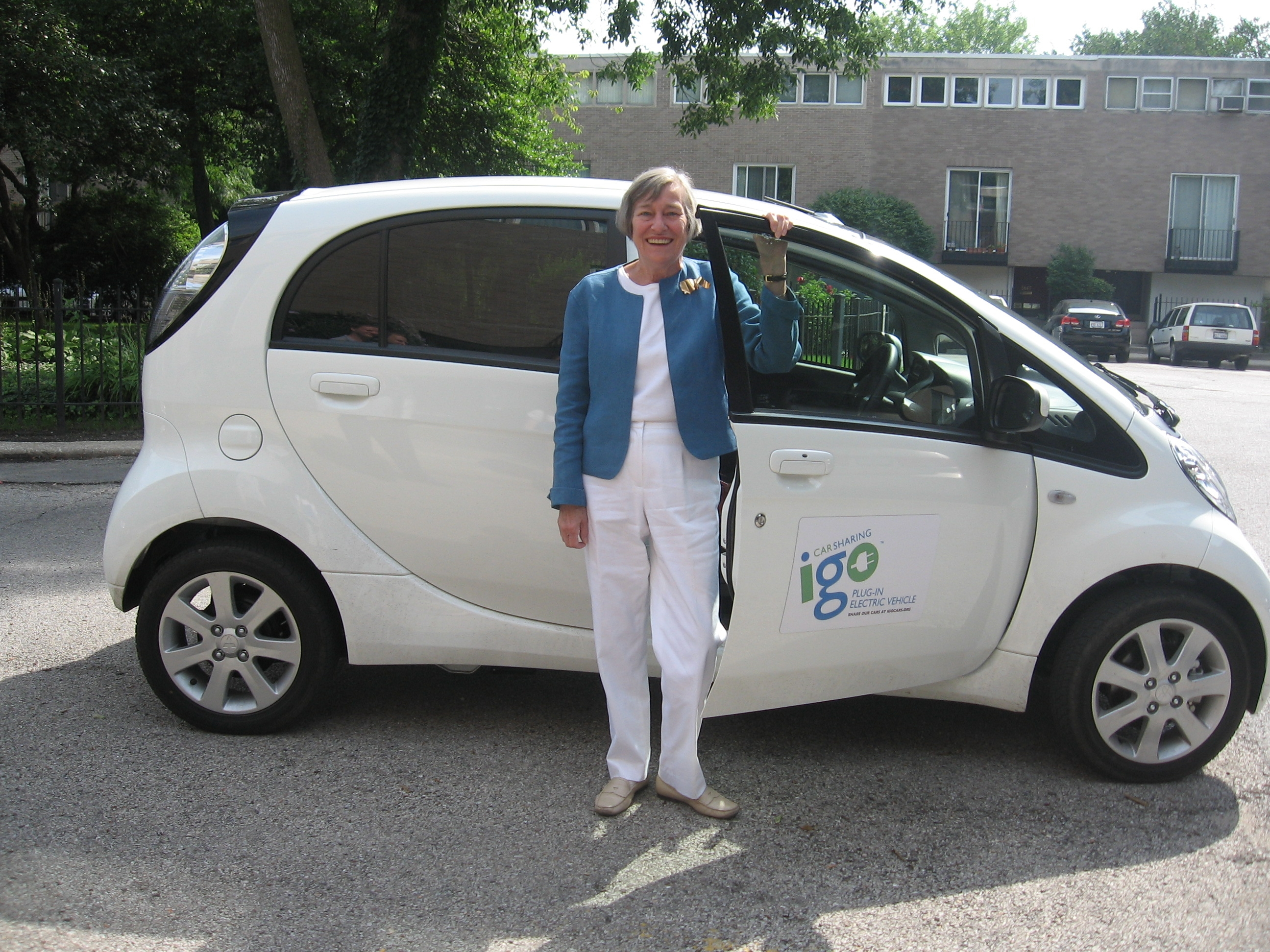
U.S. Representative Barbara Flynn Currie with a Mitsubishi i-MiEV electric car that was operated by I-GO as a trial

I-GO added the first two plug-in hybrid electric vehicles to its fleet of vehicles in April 2009 as a result of a joint effort with electricity provider ComEd.

== Partnerships ==
I-GO had strategic partnerships and alliances with government offices, local businesses, as well as other non-profits and independent car sharing organizations. Among others, I-GO worked closely with the Chicago Transit Authority, City of Chicago and Chicago Park District. Businesses such as Whole Foods and Dominick's provided parking spaces dedicated to I-GO cars, and I-GO also worked with universities, including Northwestern University, University of Chicago, Loyola University Chicago, DePaul University, University of Illinois at Chicago and Illinois Institute of Technology.

== See also ==
- Carsharing
- Plug-in hybrid electric vehicles
