= Uplift Financial Development Corporation =

Community development financial institution in the US

Uplift Financial Development Corporation (formerly Southern Bancorp)
- Type: Public
- Industry: Financial services, Philanthropy, Mortgage
- Founded: 1986
- Headquarters: Little Rock, Arkansas, United States
- Area served: Arkansas, Mississippi, Missouri, Oklahoma, Texas
- Total assets: $4,900,000,000 (2026)
- Website: uplift.bank

Uplift Financial Development Corporation (formerly Southern Bancorp) is a community development financial institution headquartered in Little Rock, Arkansas. It was founded in 1986 as Southern Development Bancorporation, and is often referred to simply as "Uplift".

With 69 locations, the organization historically focused most of its work in the Arkansas Delta and Mississippi Delta and in recent years has grown into Missouri, Oklahoma, and Texas. Uplift's community-development work in these areas has directly improved various aspects of resident's lives through different projects such as the Delta Bridge Project, The Arkadelphia Promise, and numerous other sponsorships, projects, and impactful work.

The organization is led by CEO Darrin Williams, a former lawmaker, consumer protections attorney, and politician from the state of Arkansas.

== Origin ==
In 1986, then Arkansas Governor Bill Clinton partnered with the Winthrop Rockefeller Foundation to help combat different issues plaguing the state. From this initiative, various nonprofit development agencies came together to form Southern Bancorp.

In 2026, the organization unveiled the new name Uplift to better reflect its unique mission, history, and purpose.

== Structure ==
There are three entities that make up Uplift:

- Uplift Financial Development Corporation, a CDFI bank holding company.
- Uplift Bank, a CDFI bank.
- Uplift Capital Partners, a CDFI nonprofit loan fund and financial development organization.
