= Underbanked =

Those without sufficient access to mainstream financial services

The underbanked is a characteristic describing people or organizations who do not (or volunteer to not) have sufficient access to mainstream financial services and products typically offered by retail banks and thus often deprived of banking services such as credit cards or loans. The underbanked can be characterized by a strong reliance on non-traditional forms of finance and micro-finance often associated with disadvantaged and the poor, such as cheque cashers, loan sharks and pawnbrokers.

Many people who are classified as underbanked may also have a language barrier, such as migrant workers, be unable to access banking facilities due to distance, such as the elderly, or simply feel uncomfortable using automated teller machines.

The underbanked are a distinct group from the unbanked, who are characterized by having no banking facilities at all.

== Distribution ==
Small countries have fewer banking provisions than large countries, even allowing for the smaller size of their economies.

== See also ==
- Banking desert
- Banking agent
- Neobank
- Payday lending
- Predatory lending
- Prepaid debit card
- Remittance
