= Interwar farm crisis =

Reduced agricultural demand in the 1920s and 1930s

The interwar farm crisis was an extended period of reduced agricultural demand between the end of the First and Second World Wars.

== Crisis of the 1920s and 1930s ==
A farm crisis began in the 1920s, commonly believed to be a result of high production for military needs in World War I. At the onset of the crisis, there was high market supply, high prices, and available credit for both the producer and consumer. The U.S. government continued to instill inflationary policy following World War I. By June 1920, crop prices averaged 31% above 1919 prices and 121% above prewar prices of 1913. Also, farm land prices rose 40 percent from 1913 to 1920. Crops of 1920 cost more to produce than any other year. A price break which began in July 1920 squeezed farmers between decreasing agricultural prices and steady industrial prices. Examples of agriculture price declines include: Cotton went from 12.4 cents/lb. (average 1909-1914 prices) to 5.5 cents/lb. in 1933; corn was down over 23% per bushel, and hogs declined from $7.24 to $2.94 per hog. Furthermore, a region of the great plains was hit by an extreme drought which added to the agricultural difficulties of the time, leading to depopulation.

== Reformation of the 1920s and 1930s ==
Throughout this crisis there were many attempts to form Farmers' Unions. This was difficult considering the lack of effective communication technology, the lack of electricity on many farms, and the overall size of the country. The Agricultural Marketing Act of 1929 intended to bring government aid to cooperatives. It allowed the Federal Farm Board to make loans and other assistance in hopes of stabilizing surplus and prices. On May 12, 1933, congress passed the Agricultural Adjustment Act (AAA), which aimed to restore Farmers’ pre World War 1 abilities to sell farm products for the same worth they were able to buy non-farm products. The AAA involved seven different crops: corn, wheat, cotton, rice, peanuts, tobacco, and milk. Farmers were paid to not plant those seven crops, thus decreasing supply and returning to market equilibrium. In order to prevent noncooperative farmers from taking advantage of decreasing supply, the government payments to cooperative farmers were designed to be more beneficial than being noncooperative and flooding the market. The AAA was deemed unconstitutional on January 6, 1936. Further reformation included Farm Credit Act of 1933, which allowed farmers to re-mortgage no longer affordable property, as well as the Frazier–Lemke Farm Bankruptcy Act.
