= CoBank =

Part of the US Farm Credit System

CoBank, ACB

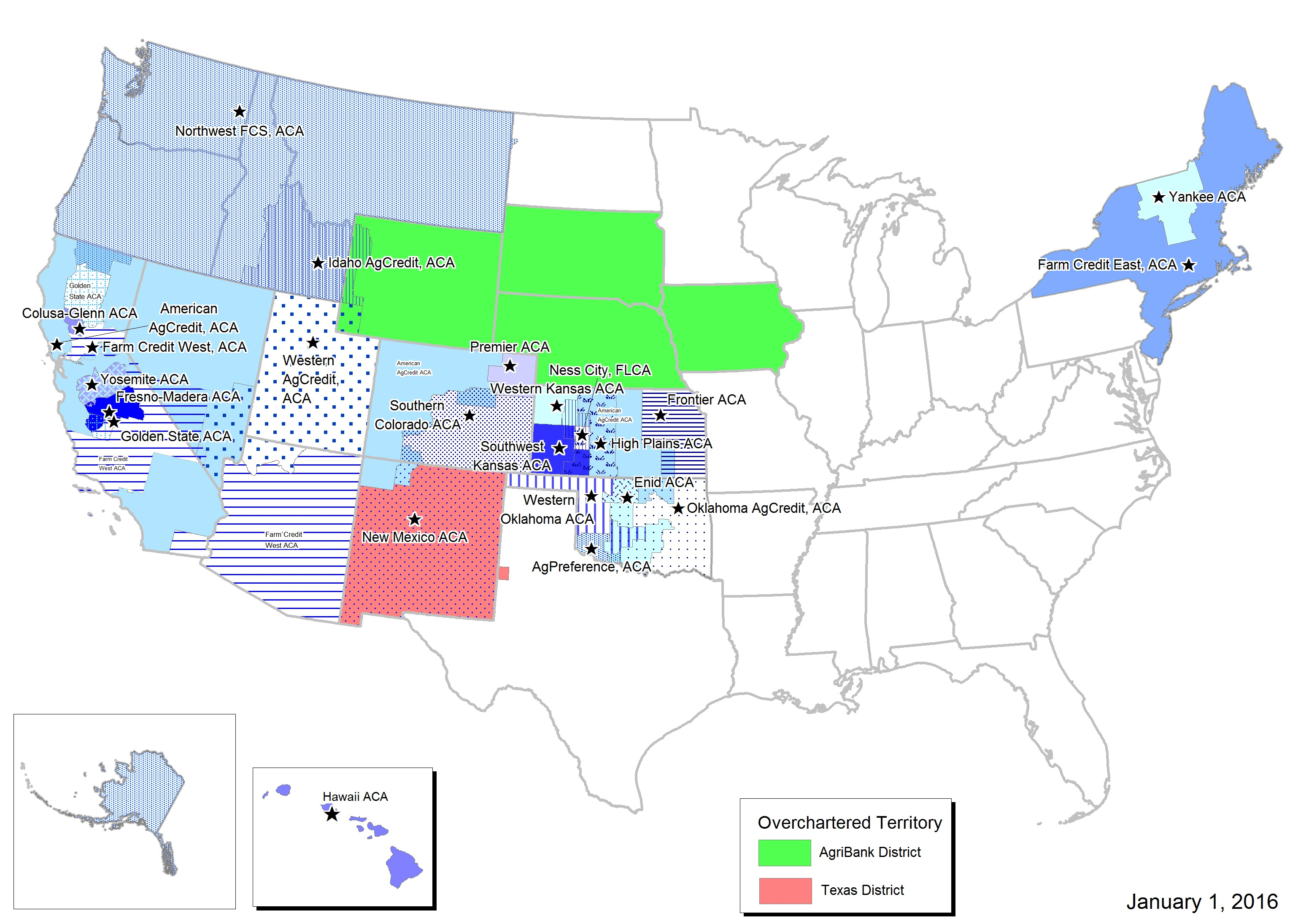
- Charter territory for Farm Credit Bank operations
- Type: Cooperative bank; Government-sponsored enterprise
- Industry: Agribusiness; Cooperatives; Financial services
- Founded: January 1, 1989
- Headquarters: Greenwood Village, Denver, Colorado
- Key people: Thomas Halverson, President and CEO
- Net income: ▼US$ 1.1 billion (2019)
- Total assets: ▲US$ 145 billion (2019)
- Total equity: ▲US$ 10.5 billion (2019)
- Website: www.cobank.com

CoBank, part of the US Farm Credit System, provides loans and financial services to cooperatives, agribusinesses, rural public utilities and other farm credit associations, who collectively own CoBank. It is also an agricultural export credit agency, exclusive among banks of the Farm Credit System. This makes it an agricultural credit bank, a combination of a farm credit bank and a bank for cooperatives. It is based in Greenwood Village, Colorado, outside Denver.

In 1989, the National Bank for Cooperatives was created under the voluntary options of the Agricultural Credit Act of 1987 by a merger of eleven of thirteen bank for cooperatives (including the Central Bank for Cooperatives) created with the Farm Credit Act of 1933. The remaining two banks joined in 1995 when it changed its name to CoBank and merged with the Springfield Bank for Cooperatives and the Farm Credit Bank of Springfield, and in 1999 with the merger of St. Paul Bank for Cooperatives. In 2012, CoBank merged with US AgBank, FCB. In 2014, they announced the construction of a new headquarters next to Fiddler's Green Amphitheatre, which opened in December 2015.

== See also ==
- Director of Revenue of Missouri v. CoBank ACB
- Northwest Farm Credit Services, ACA
- Farm Credit of New Mexico, ACA
