= Farm Credit Act of 1971 =

- Long title: An Act to further provide for the farmer-owned cooperative system of making credit available to farmers and ranchers and their cooperatives, for rural residences, and to associations and other entities upon which farming operations are dependent, to provide for an adequate and flexible flow of money into rural areas, and to modernize and consolidate existing farm credit law to meet current and future rural credit needs, and for other purposes.
- Enacted by: the 92nd United States Congress
- Effective: December 10, 1971

Citations
- Public law: 92-181
- Statutes at Large: 85 Stat. 583

Codification
- Titles amended: 31 U.S.C.: Money and Finance
- U.S.C. sections created: 31 U.S.C. ch. 7 § 742

Legislative history
- Introduced in the Senate as S. 1483 by Herman Talmadge (D–GA) on April 22, 1971; Passed the House on November 1, 1971 (331-19, in lieu of H.R. 11232); Signed into law by President Richard M. Nixon on December 10, 1971

The Farm Credit Act of 1971 (Pub. L. 92–181, 85 Stat. 583, enacted December 10, 1971) recodified all previous acts governing the Farm Credit System (FCS), a cooperatively owned government-sponsored enterprise (GSE) that provides credit primarily to farmers and ranchers.

== Background ==
The legislation was enacted by the United States government to "further provide for the farmer-owned cooperative system of making credit available to farmers and ranchers and their cooperatives, for rural residences, and to associations and other entities upon which farming operations are dependent, to provide for an adequate and flexible flow of money into rural areas, and to modernize and consolidate existing farm credit law to meet current and future rural credit needs, and for other purposes."

The Farm Credit Act of 1933 (48 Stat. 257) was first passed on June 16, 1933, the last day of President Franklin D. Roosevelt's "Hundred Days" initiative, an effort by his administration to quickly put in place measures to fight the Great Depression. The Act eliminated earlier provisions relating to government capitalization of the System, and expanded the lending authorities of many System institutions.

== Amendments ==
The Agricultural Credit Act of 1987, a major piece of legislation modifying the 1971 Act, authorized up to $4 billion in federal financial assistance to FCS institutions to assist in their recovery from the agricultural credit crisis of the 1980s. The Act created a System entity to issue up to $4 billion in federally guaranteed bonds, required the U.S. Treasury to pay a portion of the interest on these bonds, and also required the FCS to ultimately repay the Treasury for this assistance. The Act also mandated the merger of certain System banks within each farm credit district and expanded other merger authorities, and gave delinquent FCS borrowers certain rights.

A separate System institution was established by the Act to insure the timely repayment of principal and interest on consolidated Systemwide debt issues. Farm Credit Banks and Associations Safety and Soundness Act of 1992 (Pub. L. 102–552, 106 Stat. 4102, enacted October 28, 1992) was designed to enhance the financial safety and soundness of FCS banks and associations by establishing new mechanisms to ensure repayment of Farm Credit System debt resulting from federal financial assistance provided to the System under the 1987 Act. The Farm Credit System Reform Act of 1996 (Pub. L. 104–105 (text) (PDF), 110 Stat. 162, enacted February 10, 1996) included numerous provisions to provide regulatory relief for the FCS.

== See also ==
- Farm Credit Administration
- Farm Credit System
