= AgStar =

AgStar Financial Services, ACA

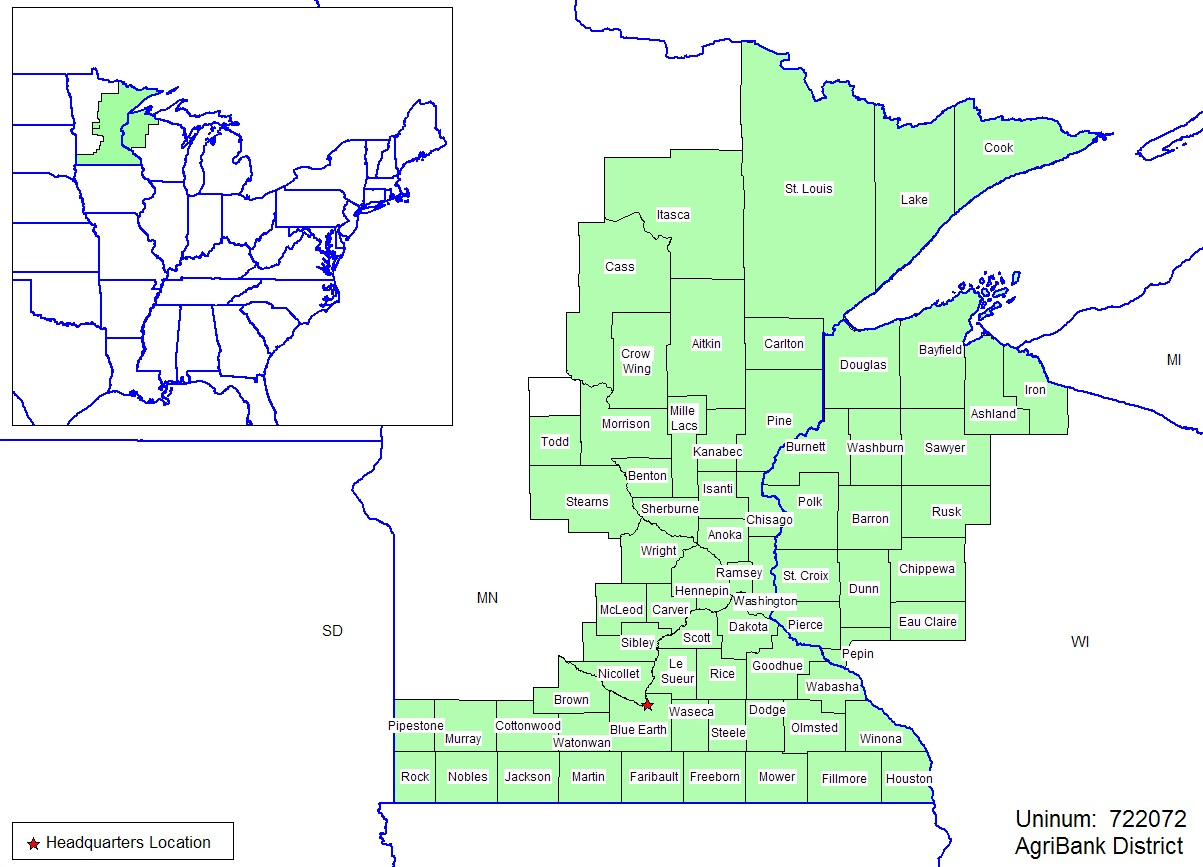
- Charter territory
- Type: Bank; Government-sponsored enterprise
- Industry: Agribusiness
- Founded: 1916
- Headquarters: Mankato, Minnesota
- Area served: United States
- Key people: Rod Hebrink, CEO
- Net income: ▲$123.9 million (2015)
- Total assets: ▲$8.36 billion (2015)
- Total equity: ▲$1.2 billion (2015)
- Number of employees: 550 +
- Website: www.agstar.com

AgStar Financial Services was a US Farm Credit System Agricultural Credit Association (ACA) that provided a wide range of farm and rural credit programs and services across 67 countries in Minnesota and northwest Wisconsin. AgStar offered a variety of financial products including agricultural loans, leases, crop insurance, life insurance, and home mortgages. The financial services offered include appraisals, money market accounts, online banking, and other consulting services.

As an cooperative ACA, AgStar was owned by 15,200 client-shareholders who received returns through patronage refunds. The organization was headquartered in Mankato, MN and is one of the larger Farm Credit associations in the nation. It is located within AgriBank Farm Credit Bank's district, who acts as a wholesale lender for AgStar. For 2015 it reported $123.9 million in net profit and $8.36 billion in assets, up from the 2014 reported values of $117.4 million in net profit and $7.67 billion in assets.

On July 1, 2017, AgStar Financial Services, Farm Credit Services and Badgerland Financial merged to form Compeer Financial. The merger was approved from the Farm Credit Association.

== Executives ==
Position	Name
President & Chief Executive Officer	Rod Hebrink
Executive Vice President and Chief Credit Officer	Joe Deufel
Sr Vice President, Relationship Management	Mark Greenwood
Sr Vice President, Operational Excellence and Quality	Jodie Hermer
Sr Vice President, Brand and Talent Strategies	John Hemstock
Sr Vice President & General Counsel	Paul Kohls
Executive Vice President & Chief Relationship Management Officer	Wick Manley
Sr Vice President & Chief Risk Officer	Tim Tracy
Sr Vice President Investments in Rural America	John Monson
