= Farm Credit System Assistance Board =

The US Farm Credit System Assistance Board was a temporary board created by the Agricultural Credit Act of 1987 (P.L. 100-233, Title II) and was responsible for approving Farm Credit System lender requests for federal financial assistance. Members of the Board consisted of the Secretary of Agriculture, Secretary of Treasury (or their appointees), and an agricultural producer with financial experience.
