= Agricultural Credit Association =

In the United States, the Agricultural Credit Association (ACA) is an institution of the Farm Credit System that has direct lending authority to make short-, intermediate-, and long-term loans to agricultural producers, rural homeowners and some farm-related businesses.

== List ==
- AgStar Financial Services
- Northwest Farm Credit Services
- Farm Credit of New Mexico
