= Farmer Veteran Coalition =

- Founded: 2009
- Type: Non-governmental organization, non-profit organization
- Headquarters: Waco, Texas
- Region served: United States
- Executive Director: Jeanette L Lombardo
- Website: www.farmvetco.org

Farmer Veteran Coalition (FVC) is a national nonprofit non-governmental organization in the United States that mobilizes veterans to feed America and transition from military service to a career in agriculture. The Farmer Veteran Coalition was founded in Davis, California by Michael O’Gorman so that veterans might serve their country in a new capacity, as providers of the nation's food and fiber. The Farmer Veteran Coalition has given out more than $5 million in grants to veterans through the Farmer Veteran Fellowship Fund.

== Partners ==
- Bob Woodruff Foundation
- Newman's Own Foundation
- Prairie Grove Farms
- Farm Credit Council
- Prudential Financial
- Kubota Corporation
- GreenStone Farm Credit Services
