= Farm Credit of New Mexico =

Coordinates: 35°11′58.1″N 106°34′53.1″W

Farm Credit of New Mexico is a FCS Agricultural Credit Association that provides New Mexico's farmers, ranchers, agricultural business, farm co-operatives and homeowners in rural communities with loans and banking services related to commercial and consumer needs. Headquartered in Albuquerque, it is the largest agricultural lender serving New Mexico. It is within both CoBank's and Farm Credit Bank of Texas's charter territories.

In recent years, Farm Credit of New Mexico has placed increased emphasis on expanding lending opportunities to the state's younger farmers and ranchers. In 2006, the institution launched a $250,000 scholarship program based at New Mexico State University. This program provides a $2,000 annual scholarship the children and grandchildren of Farm Credit of New Mexico members' enrolled as undergraduates at the university.
