= AgFirst =

AgFirst Farm Credit Bank
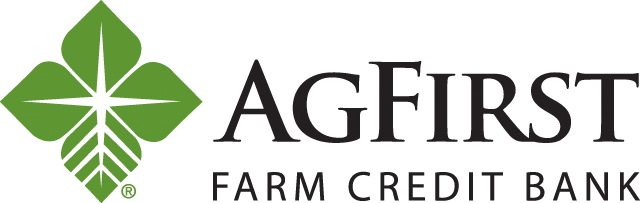

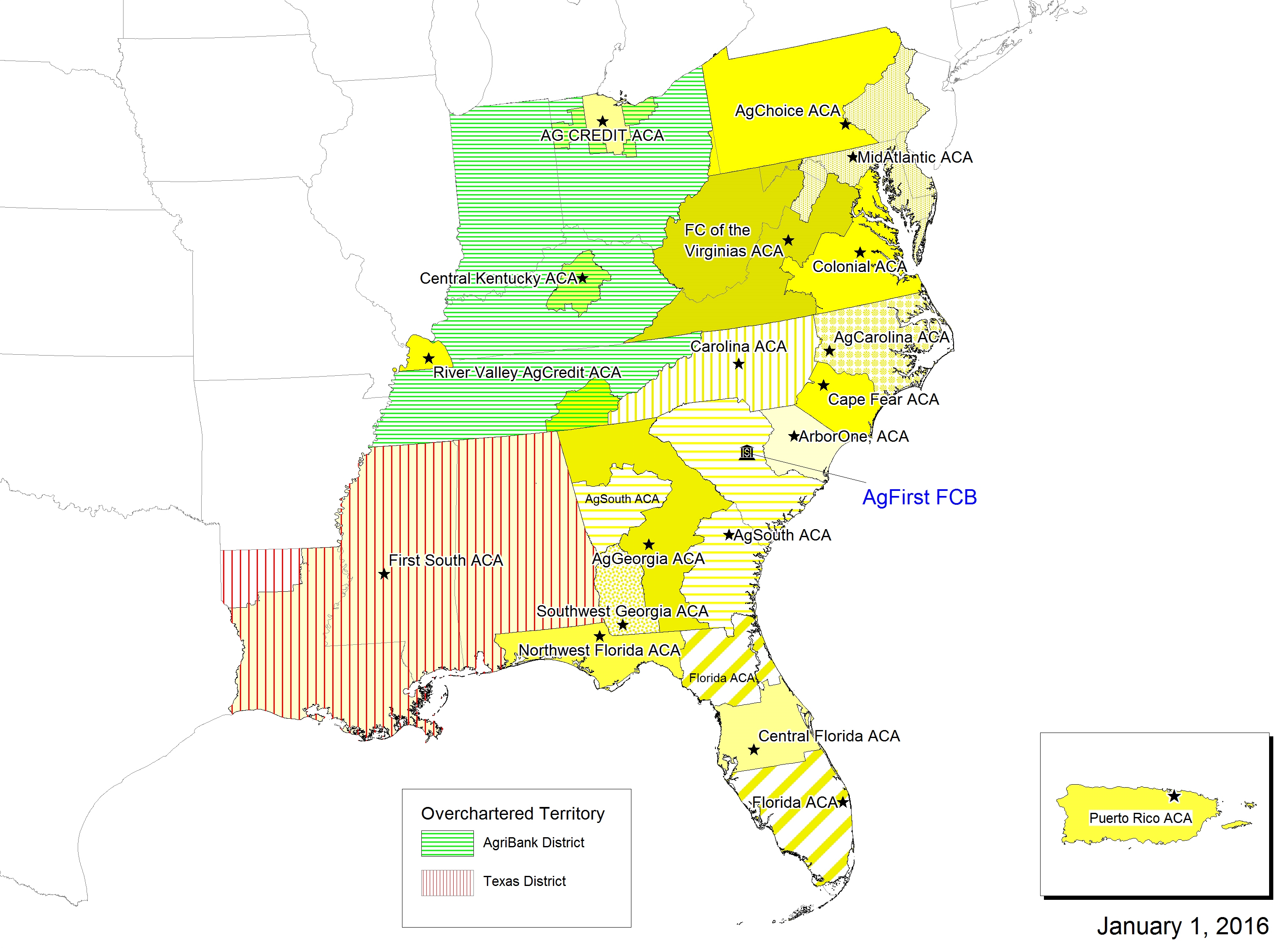
- Charter territory
- Type: Bank; Government-sponsored enterprise
- Industry: Agribusiness; Financial services
- Headquarters: Columbia, South Carolina
- Key people: Marion Harris, CEO
- Net income: ▲$417 million (2020)
- Total assets: ▲$48 billion (2025)
- Total equity: ▲$2.47 billion (2020)
- Website: www.agfirst.com

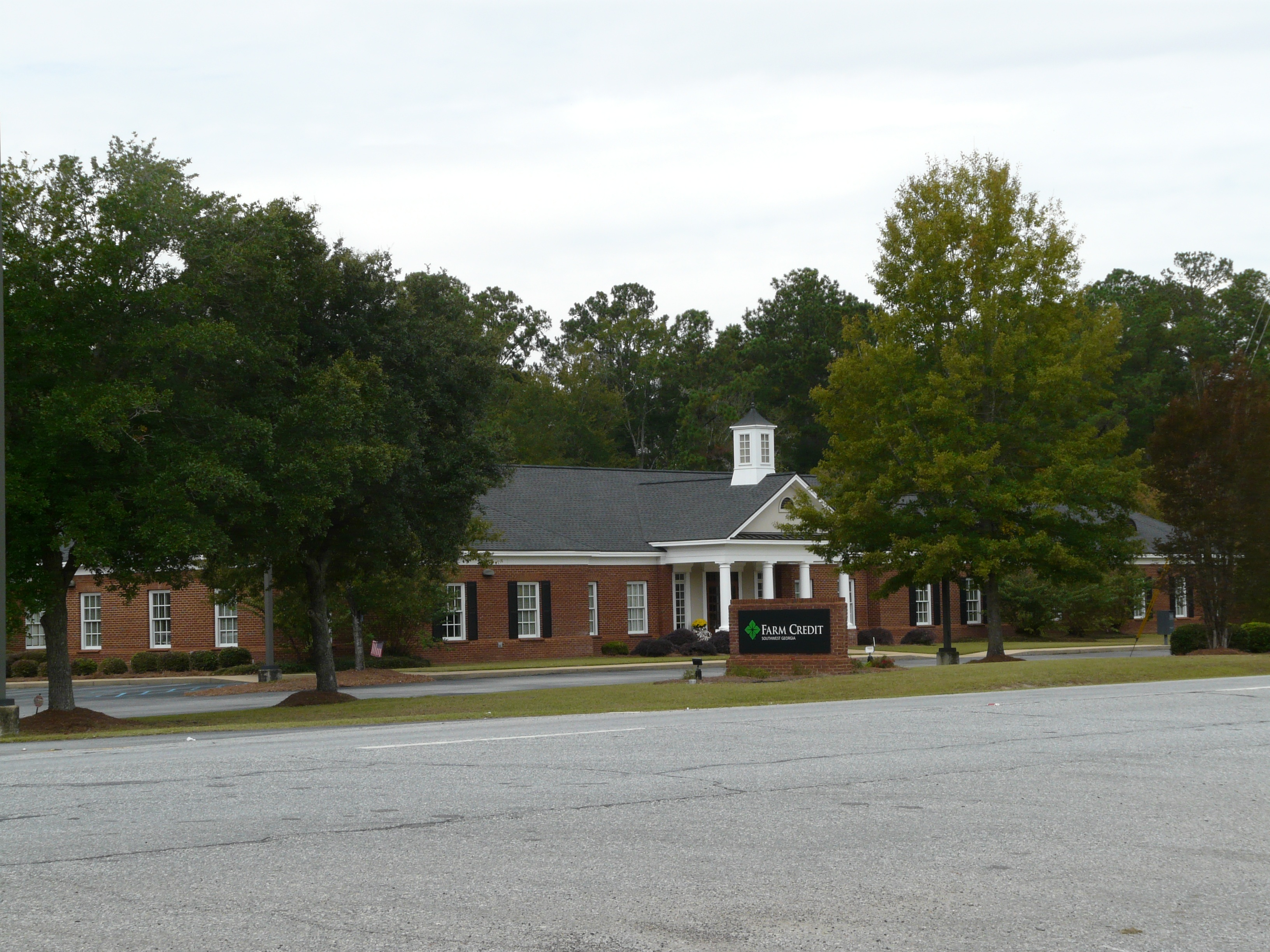
Southwest Georgia Farm Credit, an AgFirst facility in Bainbridge, Georgia

AgFirst, part of the US Farm Credit System, serves as a wholesale lender and business-service provider to a network of local farm credit associations in 15 southern and eastern states, Washington, D.C., and Puerto Rico. It was formed in 1995 by the merger of the Farm Credit Bank of Baltimore and the Farm Credit Bank of Columbia. The lender is cooperatively owned by 16 local associations. These associations, operating as Farm Credit and Ag Credit associations, provide real estate and production financing to about 80,000 farmers, agribusinesses, and rural homeowners.

AgFirst is headquartered in Columbia, South Carolina in the former Bank of America Plaza.
