= State-owned enterprises of the United States =

The United States federal government chartered and owned corporations operate to provide public services. Unlike government agencies such as the Environmental Protection Agency, the Bureau of Indian Affairs, or independent commissions, such as the Federal Communications Commission, the Nuclear Regulatory Commission, and others, they have a separate legal personality from the federal government. This gives them a higher level of political independence. Some receive federal budgetary appropriations, while some have independent sources of revenue.

== Federal-government-acquired corporations ==
Federal-government-acquired corporations' are a separate set of corporations that were originally chartered and created by an entity other than the U.S. federal government, but that were, at some point, nationalized by the federal government. Most of these are corporations temporarily in possession of the government as a result of a seizure of property of a debtor to the government, such as a delinquent taxpayer; usually, these are awaiting liquidation at auction, and most are too small to note. However, there are also corporations that the federal government has nationalized to ensure the continued provision of an essential service or services, such as the federal government's nationalization of the Alaska Northern Railroad in 1914 and Tanana Valley Railroad in 1917, now both part of the Alaska Railroad, which remained federally owned until being sold to the state of Alaska in 1985, and, on a larger scale, the nationalization of all U.S. railroads from 1917 to 1920 under the United States Railroad Administration, and nationalization of the northeastern freight railroads under Conrail in 1976. In 2025, the United States agreed to buy a 10% stake in Intel.

== List of partially or wholly federally owned enterprises ==
- Commodity Credit Corporation (CCC)
- Community Development Financial Institutions Fund
- Corporation for National and Community Service (AmeriCorps)
- Export-Import Bank of the United States
- Federal Agricultural Mortgage Corporation
- Federal Crop Insurance Corporation (FCIC)
- Federal Deposit Insurance Corporation (FDIC)
- Federal Farm Credit Banks Funding Corporation
- Federal Financing Bank (FFB)
- Federal Home Loan Banks
- Federal Home Loan Mortgage Corporation (Freddie Mac)
- Federal National Mortgage Association (Fannie Mae)
- Federal Prison Industries (UNICOR)
- The Financing Corporation
- Government National Mortgage Association (Ginnie Mae)
- Great Lakes St. Lawrence Seaway Development Corporation
- Legal Services Corporation
- Millennium Challenge Corporation (MCC)
- National Cooperative Bank
- National Corporation for Housing Partnerships (NCHP); Washington, D.C.
- National Credit Union Administration Central Liquidity Facility (CLF)
- National Endowment for Democracy
- National Flood Insurance Program (NFIP)
- National Railroad Passenger Corporation (Amtrak)
- Neighborhood Reinvestment Corporation
- Overseas Private Investment Corporation
- Pennsylvania Avenue Development Corporation
- Pension Benefit Guaranty Corporation
- Presidio Trust
- Resolution Funding Corporation
- Rural Telephone Bank
- Securities Investor Protection Corporation
- Tennessee Valley Authority (TVA)
- U.S. International Development Finance Corporation
- United States African Development Foundation
- United States Enrichment Corporation
- United States Postal Service

== States and local governments ==
There exists a second level of sovereign government in the United States which coexists with the federal government: the individual states of the United States. The vast majority of non-governmental corporations in the United States are chartered by the states of the United States. This includes most charitable corporations, non-profit corporations, and for-profit corporations. States also have the power to charter corporations that they own, control, or are responsible for the regulation and finance of. These include municipal corporations and state chartered and owned corporations. State government-chartered and -owned corporations are numerous and provide public services. Examples include North Dakota Mill and Elevator and South Dakota Public Broadcasting. Generally speaking, a statute passed by a state legislature specifically sets up a government-owned company in order to undertake a specific public purpose with public funds or public property. Lotteries in the United States are also run by government corporations, such as the Georgia Lottery Corporation and many others.

=== List of partially or wholly state owned enterprises ===
- Alaska
  - Alaska Industrial Development and Export Authority
- California
  - California Infrastructure and Economic Development Bank
  - California Low Cost Auto Insurance Program
- Georgia
  - Georgia Agricultural Development Authority
- North Dakota
  - Bank of North Dakota
  - North Dakota Mill and Elevator
- Maryland
  - Maryland Automobile Insurance Fund

=== List of partially or wholly territory owned enterprises ===
- American Samoa
  - Territorial Bank of American Samoa
- Puerto Rico - see List of government-owned corporations of Puerto Rico

== Tribal governments ==
There also exists a third level of sovereign government in the United States: the sovereignty of the Native American tribal governments. As such, the Native American (including Alaska Native) tribal governments have the power to charter corporations and undertake public undertakings that might benefit their citizens, Native Americans are therefore not only citizens of their particular tribes, but also citizens of their respective U.S. states, and of the United States. For example, a tribal council could establish a public service broadcaster along the lines of Ireland's Raidió Teilifís Éireann, partially-fund it with a television license on tribal land, and make up the difference through advertising, thereby making it both a means of uniting the tribe and giving it a voice and a commercial venture by the tribe.

The Alaska Natives are particularly advanced in using their tribal sovereignty to incorporate corporations that are owned by and for the benefit of their tribal citizens and often compete in highly competitive economic sectors through the Alaska Native Regional Corporations. The Native American tribes in the 48 contiguous states often use their sovereignty and their ability to charter to compete using regulatory easements; for instance, Native American tribal corporations often trade in goods that are highly taxed in surrounding states (such as tobacco), or engage in activities that surrounding states have (for reasons of public policy) forbidden, such as the operation of casinos or other gaming establishments. Most of these endeavors have proven very successful for Native American tribal sovereigns and their tribal corporations, bringing wealth into the hands of Native Americans.
