= Agriculture Mediation Program =

The Agriculture Mediation Program is program initially authorized by the Agricultural Credit Act of 1987 (P.L. 100-233, Title V, and recently amended by P.L. 106-472, Sec. 306; 7 U.S.C. 5101), to facilitate the use of mediation to settle disputes arising in conjunction with United States Department of Agriculture actions. If agreement is not reached through mediation, all parties remain free to pursue other available administrative appeals or legal actions. Typical areas of dispute include farm loans, farm and conservation programs, wetland determinations, rural water loan programs, grazing on national forest lands, and pesticides. This program is administered by the Farm Service Agency (FSA).
