= Jones–Connally Act 1934 =

US law, passed 1934, as part of the New Deal

The Jones–Connally Act was a New Deal Initiative passed by Congress in April 1934 as an extension to the Agricultural Adjustment Act. Largely in response to the great drought of 1933–1934, cattle ranchers acted against their former opposition to the commodification of cattle and appealed to the government for assistance in ridding of themselves of the millions of cattle they could no longer afford to feed or to keep alive without a loss on return.

The Jones–Connally Act made cattle a basic commodity, which gave the government authority over the distribution and processing of the cattle for public relief purposes. The act allocated $50 million to the Federal Surplus Relief Corporation for the purchase of dairy and beef products and to the elimination of diseased beef and dairy cattle. The Act was the first of its kind following the Agricultural Adjustment Act to give the FSRC legitimate congressional recognition and some more political bargaining power. Additionally, the act united the meat and dairy industry, who had previously been blaming each other for beef and dairy surpluses in the year leading up to the act.

Following the passage of the act, the secretary of agriculture purchased approximately 8.3 million head of cattle at a cost of $111,546,104 for use by the FSRC. 1.5 million of these animals were deemed unfit for human consumption and were buried while the rest were sent to the FSRC for immediate processing. After distribution to commercial packing houses, to SERAs (State Emergency Relief Association) for processing in work relief projects, to temporary pasturage until facilities became available, or for use as dairy or breeder cows, the FSRC had processed 657,396,312 pounds of fresh and canned beef. This represented 3.5% of the average annual consumption of pork and beef.
