= Farm Credit Act of 1933 =

United States federal law

- Long title: An Act to provide for organizations within the Farm Credit Administration to make loans for the production and marketing of agricultural products, to amend the Federal Farm Loan Act, to amend the Agricultural Marketing Act, to provide a market for obligations of the United States, and for other purposes.
- Enacted by: the 73rd United States Congress
- Effective: June 16, 1933

Citations
- Public law: 73-75
- Statutes at Large: 48 Stat. 257

Legislative history
- Introduced in the House as H.R. 5790 by John Marvin Jones (D–TX) on May 29, 1933; Passed the House on May 31, 1933 (passed); Passed the Senate on June 10, 1933 (passed); Reported by the joint conference committee on June 10, 1933; agreed to by the House on June 10, 1933 (agreed) and by the Senate on June 10, 1933 (agreed); Signed into law by President Franklin D. Roosevelt on June 16, 1933

The Farm Credit Act of 1933 (Pub. L. 73–75, 48 Stat. 257, enacted June 16, 1933) established the Farm Credit System (FCS) as a group of cooperative lending institutions to provide short-, intermediate-, and long-term loans for agricultural purposes. Specifically, it authorized the Farm Credit Administration (FCA) to create 12 Production Credit Associations (PCAs) and 12 Banks for Cooperatives (BCs) alongside the 12 established Federal Land Banks (FLBs), as well as a Central Bank for Cooperatives.

The Farm Credit Act of 1971 recodified all previous acts governing the Farm Credit System.

== See also ==
- Agricultural Marketing Act of 1929
- Federal Farm Loan Act
