= AgriBank =

American farm lending bank

AgriBank, FCB
- Type: Bank; Government-sponsored enterprise
- Industry: Agribusiness; Financial services
- Headquarters: Richfield, Minnesota
- Key people: Jeff Swanhorst, CEO
- Net income: ▲US$ 1.0 billion (2025)
- Total assets: ▲US$ 205.7 billion (2025)
- Website: Https://www.AgriBank.com

AgriBank, part of the U.S. Farm Credit System, serves as a wholesale lender and a Farm Credit Bank (FCB) to a 15-state network of local Farm Credit Associations in a District that stretches from Ohio to Wyoming and Minnesota to Arkansas. AgriBank is the second largest of the four Banks in the Farm Credit System and has over $200 billion in assets. Like AgFirst Farm Credit Bank and Farm Credit Bank of Texas, AgriBank is organized as an FCB while CoBank, the fourth Bank in the System, is organized as an Agricultural Credit Bank (ACB).

AgriBank is owned by member Associations, which are owned by agricultural borrowers. In 2026, it relocated its headquarters to Richfield, Minnesota.

Leadership includes an 17-seat board of directors and an executive team based in Richfield. Directors serve four-year terms.

== History ==
AgriBank is the product of mergers of several regional Farm Credit Banks:

- 1992 merger of the Farm Credit Bank of Saint Louis and Farm Credit Bank of Saint Paul to form AgriBank.
- 1994 merger with the Farm Credit Bank of Louisville.
- 1994 merger of the Farm Credit Bank of Spokane and Farm Credit Bank of Omaha to form AgAmerica Farm Credit Bank.
- 2003 merger with AgAmerica Farm Credit Bank.
