= Farm Credit Administration =

US federal government independent agency regulating farm loans

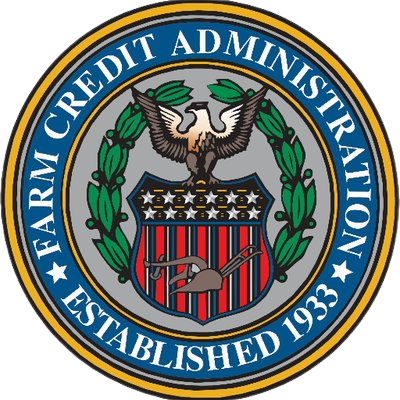
- Seal of the Farm Credit Administration

- Logo of the Farm Credit Administration

Agency overview
- Formed: March 27, 1933
- Preceding agency: Federal Farm Board
- Jurisdiction: United States
- Headquarters: McLean, Virginia
- Agency executive: Jeffery S. Hall, Chairman of the Board and CEO
- Key document: Farm Credit Act of 1971
- Website: www.fca.gov

The Farm Credit Administration is an independent agency of the federal government of the United States. Its function is to regulate the financial institutions that provide credit to farmers.

== Authority ==
The Farm Credit Administration is an independent agency of the executive branch of the federal government of the United States. It regulates and examines the banks, associations, and related entities of the Farm Credit System, a network of borrower-owned financial institutions that provide credit to farmers, ranchers, and agricultural and rural utility cooperatives, as well as provides oversight for Farmer Mac. It derives its authority from the Farm Credit Act of 1971. The FCA is headquartered in McLean, Virginia, near Washington, DC.

== History ==
The Farm Credit Administration was established by Executive Order 6084, which transferred most of the functions of the Federal Farm Board to the new Agricultural Adjustment Administration. The Federal Farm Board was then renamed the Farm Credit Administration.

The Farm Credit Act of 1933 provides for organizations within the Farm Credit Administration. The Farm Credit Act of 1933 was part of President Franklin D. Roosevelt's New Deal, to help farmers refinance mortgages over a longer time at below-market interest rates at regional and national banks. This helped farmers recover from the Dust Bowl. The Emergency Farm Mortgage Act loaned funds to farmers in danger of losing their properties. The campaign refinanced 20% of farmer's mortgages.

An executive order by Roosevelt in 1933 placed all existing agricultural credit organizations under the supervision of a new agency, the Farm Credit Administration. This included the Federal Farm Board. The Farm Credit Administration was independent until 1939, when it became part of the U.S. Department of Agriculture, but became an independent agency again under the Farm Credit Act of 1953. This Act created a Federal Farm Credit Board with 13 members (one from each of the 12 agricultural districts and one appointed by the Secretary of Agriculture) to develop policy for the Farm Credit Administration.

The Farm Credit Act of 1971 recodified all previous acts governing the Farm Credit System.

== FCA board ==
The FCA board consists of three members, who are appointed by the President, by and with the advice and consent of the Senate. The President appoints members of the Board who are experienced or knowledgeable in agricultural economics and financial reporting and disclosure; are experienced or knowledgeable in the regulation of financial entities; or have a strong financial, legal, or regulatory background. A maximum of two members may be members of the same political party. They each serve terms of six years, but they may continue to serve until their successor has been confirmed and taken office. The President designates one of the members to serve as Chairman of the Board for the duration of the member’s term.

=== Board members ===
The current FCA board as of September 24, 2026:

Position	Name	Party	Took office	Term expires
Chair	Jeffery S. Hall	Republican	March 17, 2015 (as member); January 20, 2025 (as Chair)	October 13, 2018
Member	Vacant	—N/a	—	May 21, 2028
Member	Vacant	—N/a	—	May 21, 2032

=== Nominations ===
President Trump has nominated the following to fill a seat on the board. They await Senate confirmation.

Name	Party	Term expires	Replacing
Carl Bednarski	Republican	May 21, 2028	Glen R. Smith
Carl Bednarski	Republican	May 21, 2034	Reappointment
John Grunewald II	Republican	May 21, 2032	Vincent G. Logan
James Russell Middleton	Democratic	October 13, 2030	Jeffery S. Hall

== List of chairpersons ==
List of chairpersons since 1986:

No.	Portrait	Chairpersons	Took office	Left office	Ref.
Acting		Donald E. Wilkinson	January 23, 1986	March 28, 1986	
Acting		Kenneth J. Auberger	March 29, 1986	May 21, 1986	
1		Frank W. Naylor Jr.	May 22, 1986	November 11, 1988	
Acting		Marvin Duncan	November 12, 1988	October 9, 1989	
2		Harold B. Steele	October 10, 1989	September 8, 1993	
3		Billy Ross Brown	August 31, 1993	October 17, 1994	
4		Marsha Pyle Martin	October 17, 1994	January 9, 2000	
5		Michael M. Reyna	January 13, 2000	December 1, 2004	
6		Nancy C. Pellett	May 22, 2004	May 21, 2008	
7		Leland A. Strom	May 22, 2008	November 27, 2012	
8		Jill Long Thompson	November 27, 2012	March 12, 2015	
9		Kenneth A. Spearman	March 13, 2015	November 21, 2016	
10		Dallas P. Tonsager	November 22, 2016	May 21, 2019	
11		Glen R. Smith	July 17, 2019	October 21, 2022	
12		Vincent G. Logan	October 21, 2022	January 20, 2025	
13		Jeffery S. Hall	January 20, 2025	present	

== See also ==
- Title 12 of the Code of Federal Regulations
- Commodity Credit Corporation
- Farm Service Agency
- Farm Credit System Insurance Corporation
- List of financial supervisory authorities by country
