= Farm Credit Council =

The Farm Credit Council is the national trade association of the Farm Credit System, a U.S. network of borrower-owned cooperative lending institutions and service organizations. The Farm Credit Council represents the Farm Credit System in legislative and regulatory lobbying before the United States Congress government and state legislatures.

The Farm Credit Council was established in 1983 and is headquartered in Washington, D.C. It is governed by a 23-person board that implements policy positions. The board consists of representatives from regional Farm Credit Council districts and banks within the Farm Credit System.

In recent years, the Farm Credit Council has sought to expand the mission of the Farm Credit System. Beginning in 2004, it coordinated efforts to leverage support for HORIZONS, a three-pronged program that would have broadened the Farm Credit System’s ability to increase its credit options for farm- and fishing-related businesses, readjust the requirements for the minimum requirements for Farm Credit System stock purchase requirements, and allow the Farm Credit System to expand its residential real estate lending outreach to communities with a population of up to 50,000 (a 1971 Congressional mandate limited Farm Credit System mortgage activities to communities with 2,500 people or less). HORIZONS was included in an original version of the 2007 Farm Bill, but it was removed before the bill went to a committee vote.

In 2008, in response to the declining number of Americans working in agriculture, the Farm Credit Council created a new staff position to encourage outreach and support for young and first-time farmers and ranchers and for minority farmers.
