= Federal Agricultural Mortgage Corporation =

Farmer agricultural bank

- Trade name: Farmer Mac
- Type: Government-sponsored public company
- Traded as: NYSE: AGM; NYSE: AGM.A; Russell 2000 Component (AGM)
- Industry: Financial services
- Founded: 1988; 38 years ago
- Headquarters: 2100 Pennsylvania Avenue N.W., Suite 450 N, Washington, D.C., United States of America
- Key people: Lowell Junkins (chair); Zachary N. Carpenter (president and CEO)
- Products: Agricultural finance and Infrastructure finance
- Revenue: ▲US$410.299 million (2025)
- Net income: ▲US$182.949 million (2025)
- Total assets: ▲US$35.370 billion (2025)
- Total equity: ▲US$1.718 billion (2025)
- Number of employees: 230 (2025)
- Website: www.farmermac.com

The Federal Agricultural Mortgage Corporation, also known as Farmer Mac, is a stockholder-owned, federally chartered corporation established by the U.S. Congress in 1988 under the Agricultural Credit Act of 1987. It was created to establish a secondary market for agricultural real estate and housing mortgage loans, to increase liquidity and the availability of long-term, stable credit for farmers, ranchers, and rural communities.

== Operations ==
Farmer Mac operates by purchasing eligible loans from agricultural and rural infrastructure lenders, guaranteeing securities backed by those loans, and providing loan funding and risk management solutions to rural financing institutions. This structure allows lenders to replenish capital and continue issuing loans, thereby contributing to liquidity in the agricultural and rural infrastructure sectors. Over time, its statutory authority has expanded to include loans for rural utilities, renewable energy, and other infrastructure projects.

Regulated by the Farm Credit Administration, Farmer Mac is one of the government-sponsored enterprises (GSEs) tasked with supporting targeted credit markets. According to the Congressional Research Service, the creation of Farmer Mac was intended to stabilize rural credit markets and attract investment into agriculture through securitization and secondary market mechanisms.

Farmer Mac supports markets such as including agriculture, agribusiness, rural broadband, power and utilities, and infrastructure financing, with the aim of enhancing the availability of long-term credit and providing greater liquidity and lending capacity for lenders to agriculture and infrastructure borrowers.

== Governance ==
Farmer Mac is under the management of the board of directors. The Board determines the general policies that governs Farmer Mac. It selects, appoints, and determines the compensation of qualified persons to fill the offices provided for in the bylaws, and it assign to them the executive functions, powers, and duties prescribed by the bylaws or by the board. These people are the executive officers of Farmer Mac and discharges the executive functions, powers, and duties of the corporation.

The board consists of 15 members. Five directors are elected by a plurality of the votes of the holders of Class A Voting Common Stock (stock that may be held only by banks, insurance companies and other financial institutions that are not Farm Credit System institutions). Five directors are elected by a plurality of the votes of the holders of Class B Voting Common Stock (stock that may be held only by Farm Credit System institutions). The final five directors are appointed by the President of the United States with the advice and consent of the United States Senate. These must be members of the general public and not be, or have been, officers or directors of any financial institutions or entities, and at least two must be experienced in farming or ranching. A maximum of three of these directors may be members of the same political party.

The members appointed by the President shall serve at the pleasure of the President. The President designates one of these members to serve as chairman. The other 10 members are elected annually for a term ending on the date of the next annual meeting of the common stockholders of the Corporation and serves until their successors takes office. Any seat on the Board that becomes vacant after the annual election of the directors shall be filled by the members of the Board from the same category of directors, but only for the unexpired portion of the term. Any member appointed to fill a vacancy occurring before the expiration of the term for which the predecessor of the member was appointed is appointed only for the remainder of such term.

The board meets at the call of the chairperson or a majority of its members. Eight members is necessary for the commission to have a quorum. Members who are fulltime officers or employees of the United States receive no additional pay by reason of service on the board.

=== Board members ===
The current members of the board appointed by the President as of October 11, 2026:

Position	Name	Party	Took office
Chair	Lowell Junkins	Democratic	June 13, 1996 (Note: Chair since March 30, 2022.)
Vice chair	LaJuana S. Wilcher	Republican	December 20, 2019 (Note: Vice chair since March 30, 2022.)
Member	Sara L. Faivre	Democratic	September 30, 2010
Member	Charles A. Stones	Republican	December 22, 2020
Member	Vacant	—N/a	—

=== Nominations ===
President Trump has nominated the following to fill seats on the board. They await Senate confirmation.

Name	Party	Replacing
Jeff Kaufmann	Republican	Chet Culver

== History ==
The Federal Agricultural Mortgage Corporation was created by the Agricultural Credit Act of 1987 (Pub. L. 100–233) as a federally chartered, private corporation responsible for guaranteeing the timely repayment of principal and interest to investors in a new agricultural secondary market. The secondary market allows a lending institution to sell a qualified farm real estate loan to an agricultural mortgage marketing facility, or pooler, which packages these loans, and sells to investors securities that are backed by, or represent interests in, the pooled loans. Farmer Mac guarantees the timely repayment of principal and interest on these securities and, under authorities granted in 1995, can also serve as a loan pooler.

The company was founded during a $4 billion bailout of the Farm Credit System, hoping to provide an alternative source of credit to farmers following the models of Fannie Mae and Ginnie Mae.

=== 2008 financial crisis ===
Farmer Mac had $47.2 million invested in Fannie Mae shares in June of the 2008 financial crisis. Over the next few months, during the Federal takeover of Fannie Mae and Freddie Mac, the investments lost about $44 million in value. The company also had significant investments in Lehman Brothers. In response, the Farm Credit System bailed the company out by purchasing $60 million in Farmer Mac stock, and Zions Bancorporation of Salt Lake City purchased another $5 million in stock.

== See also ==
- Fannie Mae
- Farm Credit System
- Freddie Mac
- Ginnie Mae
- Sallie Mae
