= Federal Farm Credit Banks Funding Corporation =

The Federal Farm Credit Banks Funding Corporation (FFCBFC) based in Jersey City, New Jersey is an entity within the Farm Credit System (FCS) that manages and coordinates the sale of system-wide bonds and notes in the national financial markets. Since the FCS, by law, is not permitted to accept customer deposits, these bonds and notes are the FCS’s primary source of loanable funds.
