= Federal Farm Board =

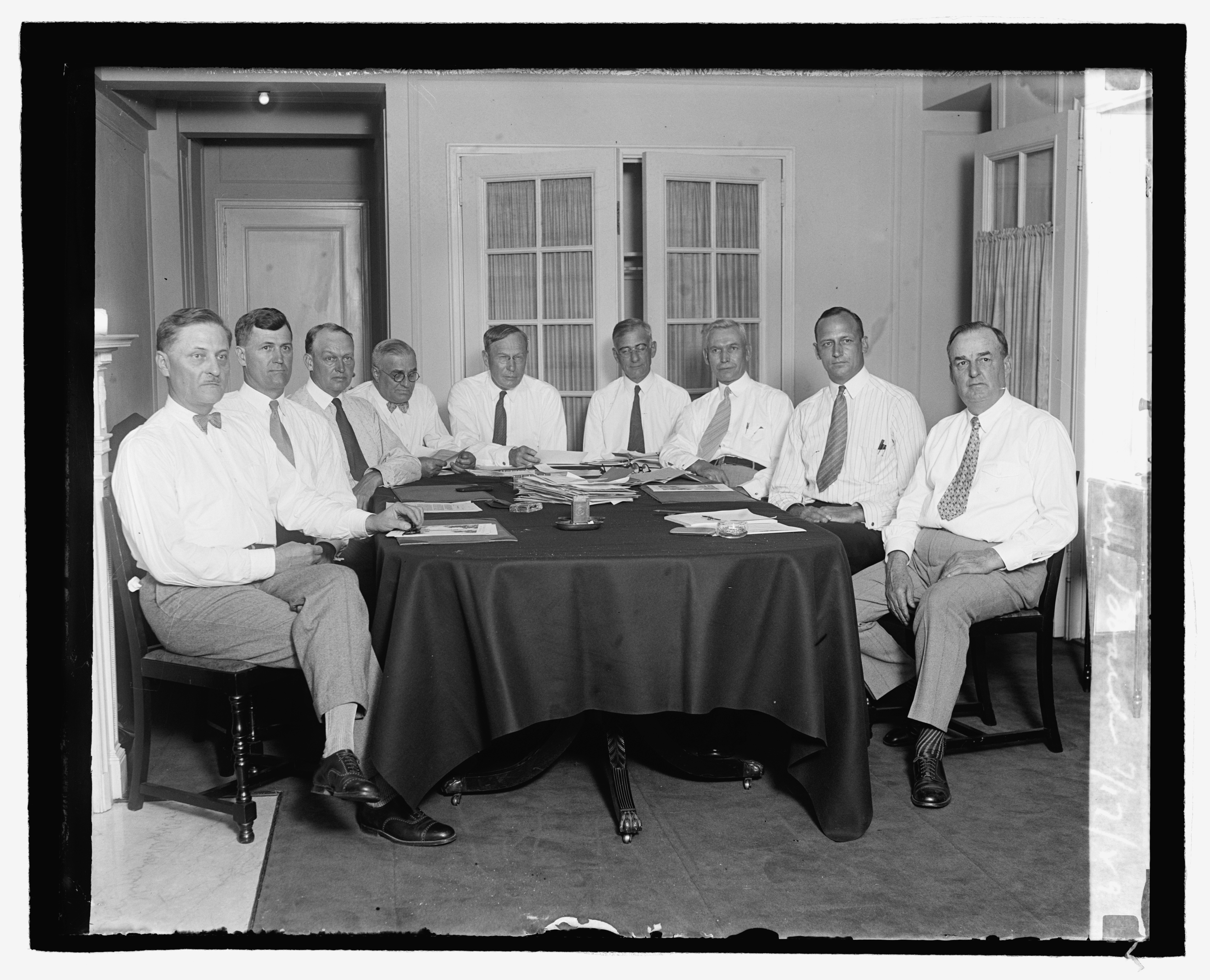
The Board in 1929

The Federal Farm Board was established by the Agricultural Marketing Act of 1929 from the Federal Farm Loan Board established by the Federal Farm Loan Act of 1916, with a revolving fund of half a billion dollars to stabilize prices and to promote the sale of agricultural products. The board would help farmers stabilize prices by buying and holding surplus grain and cotton in storage. The Farm Board was part of Herbert Hoover's response to the downward spiral of crop prices in the years leading up to the Great Depression.

Executive Order 6084 of the 26th of March, 1933, effective the 27th of May, 1933, changed its name to the Farm Credit Administration, abolished the functions vested in Federal Farm Board by section 9 of Agricultural Marketing Act, abolished the functions of Secretary of Agriculture and Secretary of Treasury as members of Board, and abolished the offices of appointed members of Federal Farm Board, except that of Chairman, which title was changed to Governor of Farm Credit Administration.
