= Agricultural Marketing Act of 1929 =

United States federal law

Agricultural Marketing Act
- Other short titles: Agricultural Marketing Act of 1929
- Long title: An Act to establish a federal farm board to promote the effective merchandising of agricultural commodities in interstate and foreign commerce, and to place agriculture on a basis of economic equality with other industries.
- Acronyms (colloquial): AMA
- Nicknames: Farm Relief Bill
- Enacted by: the 71st United States Congress
- Effective: June 15, 1929

Citations
- Public law: Pub. L. 71–10
- Statutes at Large: 46 Stat. 11

Legislative history
- Introduced in the House as H.R. 1 by Gilbert N. Haugen (R–IA) on April 17, 1929; Passed the House on April 25, 1929 (365-35); Passed the Senate on May 14, 1929 (54-33); Reported by the joint conference committee on June 13, 1929; agreed to by the House on June 13, 1929 (250-113) and by the Senate on June 14, 1929 (74-8); Signed into law by President Herbert Hoover on June 15, 1929

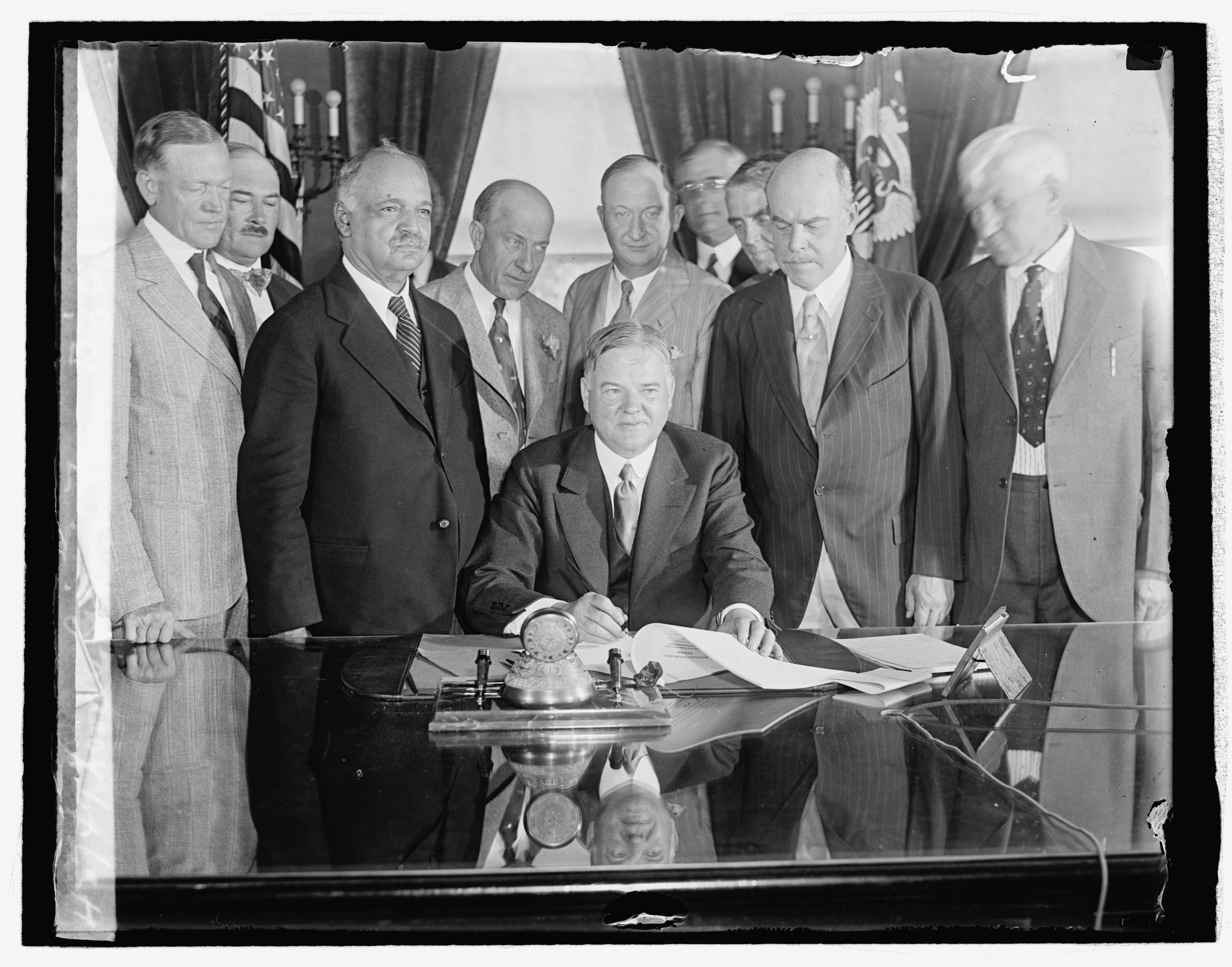
President Herbert Hoover signs the Farm Relief Bill (June 15, 1929)

The Agricultural Marketing Act of 1929, under the administration of Herbert Hoover, established the Federal Farm Board from the Federal Farm Loan Board established by the Federal Farm Loan Act of 1916 with a revolving fund of half a billion dollars. The original act was sponsored by Hoover in an attempt to stop the downward spiral of crop prices by seeking to buy, sell and store agricultural surpluses or by generously lending money to farm organizations. Money was lent out to the farmers in order to buy seed and food for the livestock, which was especially important since there had previously been a drought in the Democratic South. However, Hoover refused to lend to the farmers themselves, as he thought that it would be unconstitutional to do so and if they were lent money, they would become dependent on government money.

== Effects ==
The Federal Farm Board's purchase of surplus could not keep up with the production; as farmers realized that they could just sell the government their crops, they reimplemented the use of fertilizers and other techniques to increase production. Overall, the deflation could not be countered because of a massive fault in the bill: there was no production limit. Had there been a production limit, the deflation might have been helped somewhat. The funds appropriated were eventually exhausted and the losses of the farmers kept rising.

The H.R. 1 legislation was passed by the 71st Congressional session and enacted by the 31st President of the United States Herbert Hoover on June 15, 1929.

The Act was the precursor to the Agricultural Adjustment Act.
