= Agricultural Adjustment Act =

United States federal law of the New Deal era

Agricultural Adjustment Act (AAA)
- Other short titles: Agricultural Adjustment Act of 1933; The Farm Relief Bill
- Long title: An Act to relieve the existing national economic emergency by increasing agricultural purchasing power, to raise revenue for extraordinary expenses incurred by reason of such emergency, to provide emergency relief with respect to agricultural indebtedness, to provide for the orderly liquidation of joint-stock land banks, and for other purposes.
- Enacted by: the 73rd United States Congress
- Effective: May 13, 1933

Citations
- Public law: Pub. L. 73–10
- Statutes at Large: 48 Stat. 31

Codification
- Titles amended: 7 U.S.C.: Agriculture
- U.S.C. sections created: 7 U.S.C. ch. 26 § 601 et seq.

Legislative history
- Introduced in the House as H.R. 3835; Passed the House on March 22, 1933 (315-98); Passed the Senate on April 28, 1933 (64-20); Reported by the joint conference committee on May 10, 1933; agreed to by the House on May 10, 1933 (passed) and by the Senate on May 10, 1933 (53-28); Signed into law by President Franklin D. Roosevelt on May 12, 1933

United States Supreme Court cases
- United States v. Butler, 297 U.S. 1 (1936)

The Agricultural Adjustment Act (AAA) of 1933 was a United States federal law of the New Deal era designed to boost agricultural prices by reducing surpluses. The government bought livestock for slaughter and paid farmers subsidies not to plant on part of their land. The money for these subsidies was generated through an exclusive tax on companies that processed farm products.

The Act created a new agency, the Agricultural Adjustment Administration, also called "AAA" (1933–1942), within the U.S. Department of Agriculture, to oversee the distribution of the subsidies. The Agriculture Marketing Act, which established the Federal Farm Board in 1929, was seen as an important precursor to this act. The AAA, along with other New Deal programs, represented the federal government's first substantial effort to address economic welfare in the United States.

The AAA was in some ways controversial, with critics arguing the policies were misguided and harmful (particularly towards smaller farms). The AAA was ultimately ruled unconstitutional in 1936 with United States v. Butler, but the Agricultural Adjustment Act of 1938 tailored the program to avoid these Constitutional issues and influenced the United States farm bill which exists to the present.

== Background ==
When President Franklin D. Roosevelt took office in March 1933, the United States was in the midst of the Great Depression. "Farmers faced the most severe economic situation and lowest agricultural prices since the 1890s." "Overproduction and a shrinking international market had driven down agricultural prices." Soon after his inauguration, Roosevelt called the Hundred Days Congress into session to address economic problems.

From this Congress came the Agricultural Adjustment Administration, to replace the Federal Farm Board. The Roosevelt Administration was tasked with decreasing agricultural surpluses. Wheat, cotton, field corn, hogs, rice, tobacco, and milk and its products were designated as basic commodities in the original legislation. Subsequent amendments in 1934 and 1935 expanded the list of foods to include rye, flax, barley, grain sorghum, cattle, peanuts, sugar beets, sugar cane, and potatoes. The administration targeted these commodities for the following reasons:

1. Changes in the prices of these commodities had a strong effect on the prices of other important commodities.
2. These commodities were already running a surplus at the time.
3. These items each required some amount of processing before they could be consumed by humans.

== Goals and implementations ==
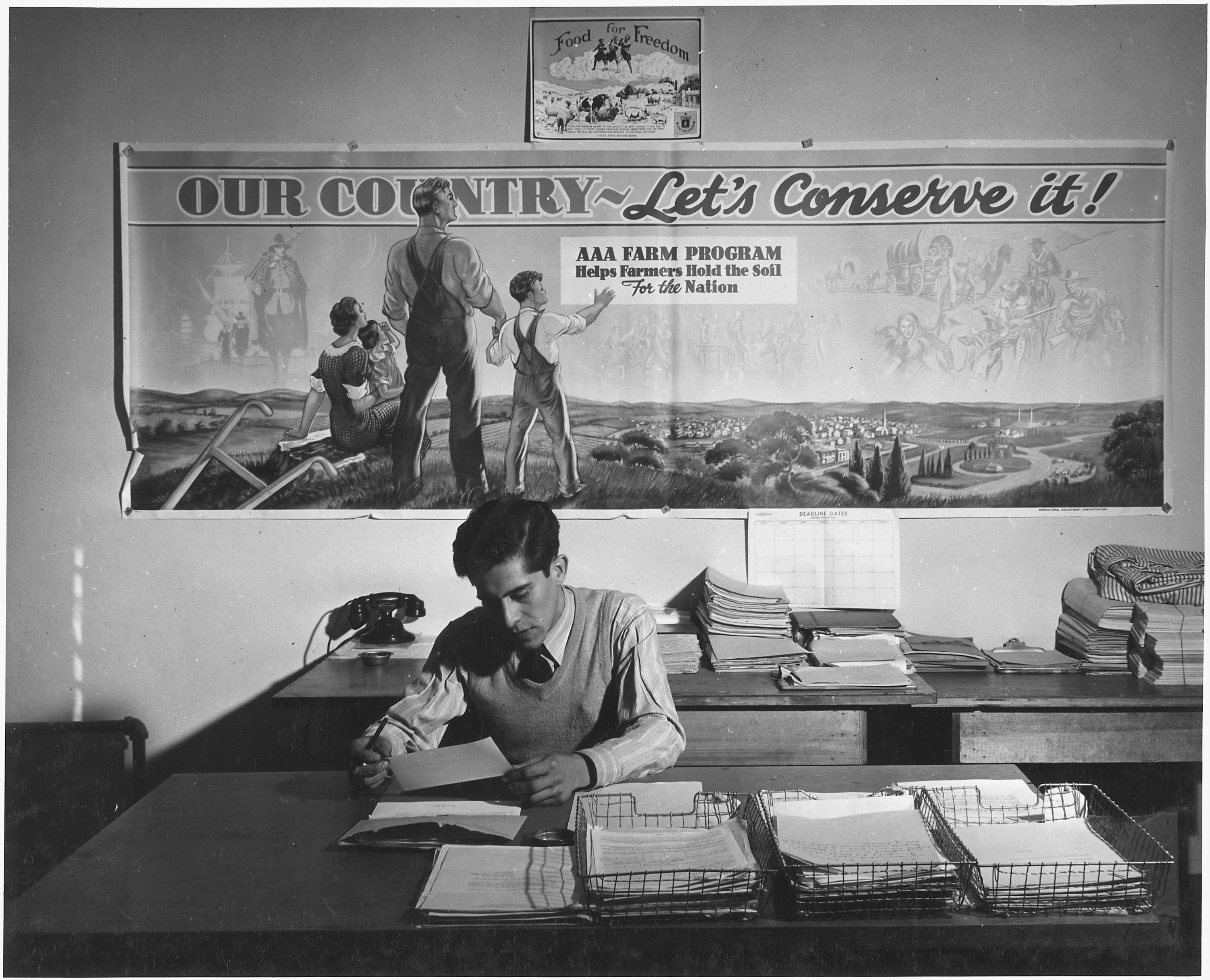
Agricultural Adjustment Administration representative in his New Mexico office (1941)

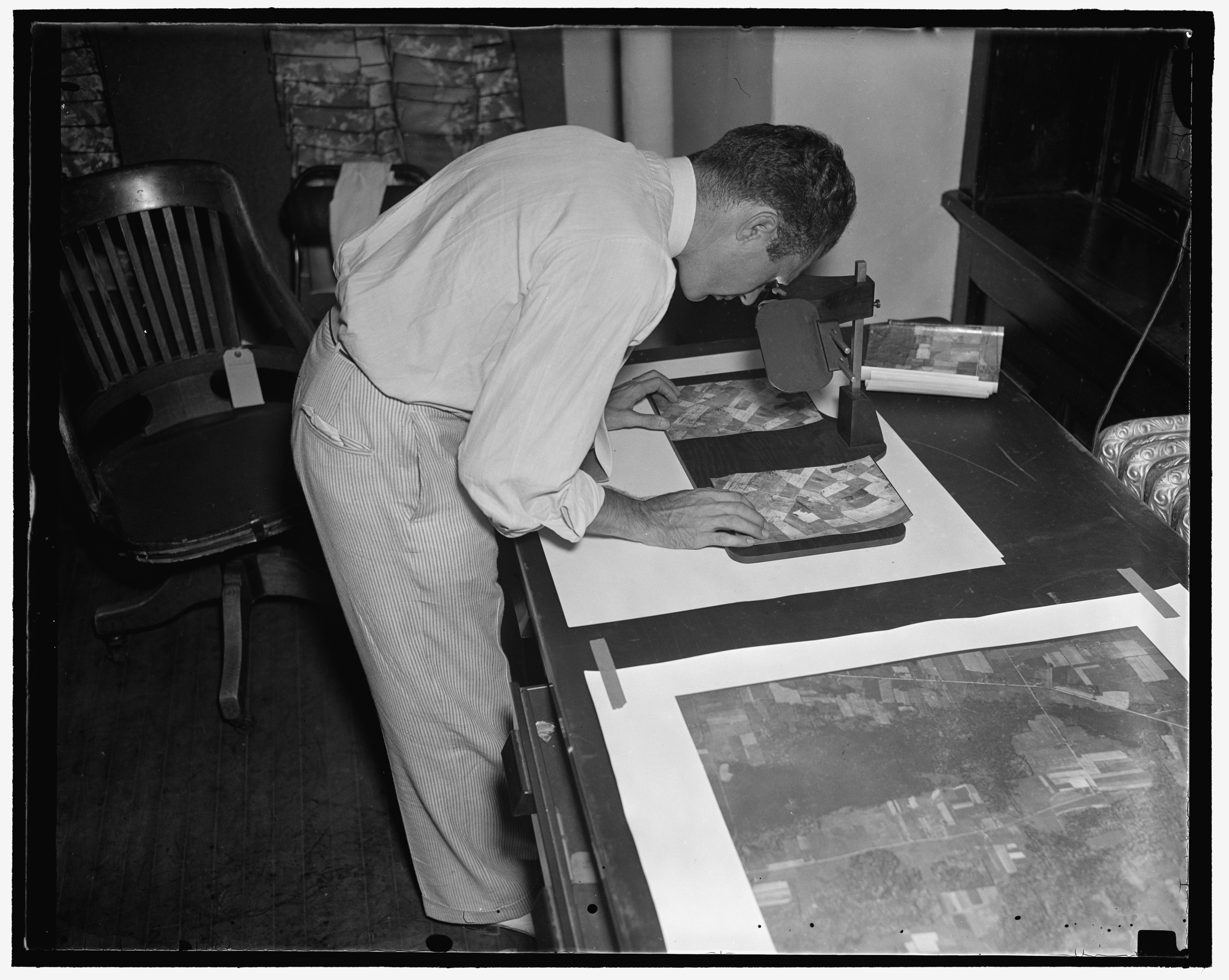
The AAA photographed one-third of the land surface of the U.S. and created a huge map to determine compliance in the agricultural conservation program, plan soil conservation and Public Works projects, lay out roads, forests and public parks, and improve national defense (1937).

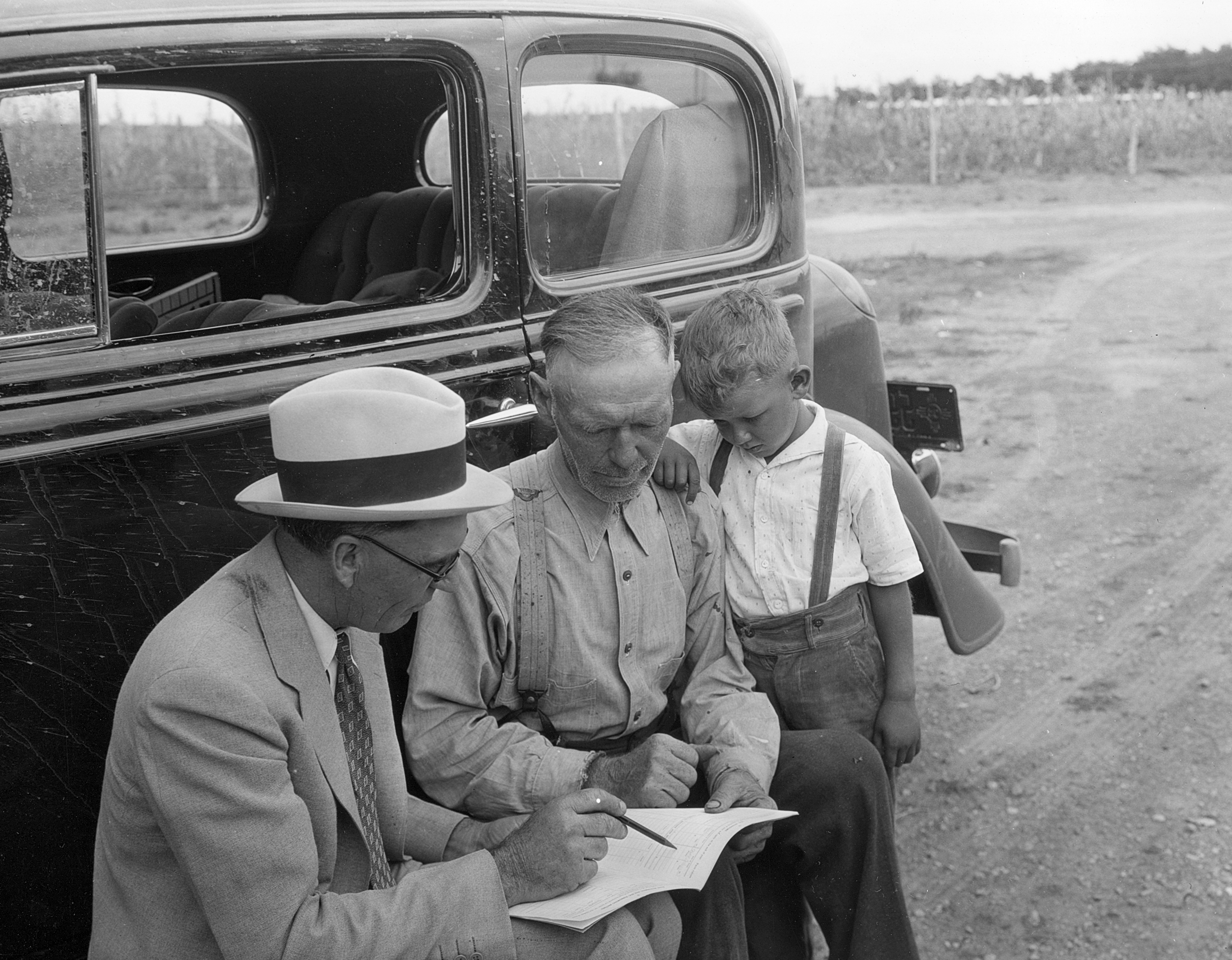
A Roosevelt County, New Mexico, farmer and a County Agricultural Conservation Committee representative review the provisions of the AAA farm program to determine how it can best be applied on that particular acreage in 1934.

"The goal of the Agricultural Adjustment Act, restoring farm purchasing power of agricultural commodities or the fair exchange value of a commodity based upon price relative to the prewar 1909–14 level, was to be accomplished through a number of methods. These included the authorization by the Secretary of Agriculture (1) to secure voluntary reduction of the acreage in basic crops through agreements with producers and use of direct payments for participation in acreage control programs; (2) to regulate marketing through voluntary agreements with processors, associations or producers, and others handling agricultural commodities to eliminate unfair practices or charges; (4) to determine the necessity for and the rate or processing taxes; and (5) to use the proceeds of taxes and appropriate funds for the cost of adjustment operations, for the expansion of markets, and for the removal or agricultural surpluses."

"Congress declared its intent, at the same time, to protect the consumers interest. This was to be done by readjusting farm production at a level that would not increase the percentage of consumers' retail expenditures above the percentage returned to the farmer in the prewar base period."

The juxtaposition of huge agricultural surpluses and the many deaths due to insufficient food shocked many, as well as some of the administrative decisions that happened under the Agricultural Adjustment Act. For example, in an effort to reduce agricultural surpluses, the government paid farmers to reduce crop production and to sell pregnant sows as well as young pigs. Oranges were being soaked with kerosene to prevent their consumption and corn was being burned as fuel because it was so cheap. There were many people, however, as well as livestock in different places starving to death. Farmers slaughtered livestock because feed prices were rising, and they could not afford to feed their own animals. Under the Agricultural Adjustment Act, "plowing under" of pigs was also common to prevent them reaching a reproductive age, as well as donating pigs to the Red Cross. In 1935, the income generated by farms was 50 percent higher than it was in 1932, which was credited to farm programs such as the AAA. Skeptics of the AAA characterized this higher income generation for farms as bad for the larger economy, as it forced food prices above levels dictated by basic supply and demand and made foodstuffs more costly for everyday Americans.

== Tenant farming ==
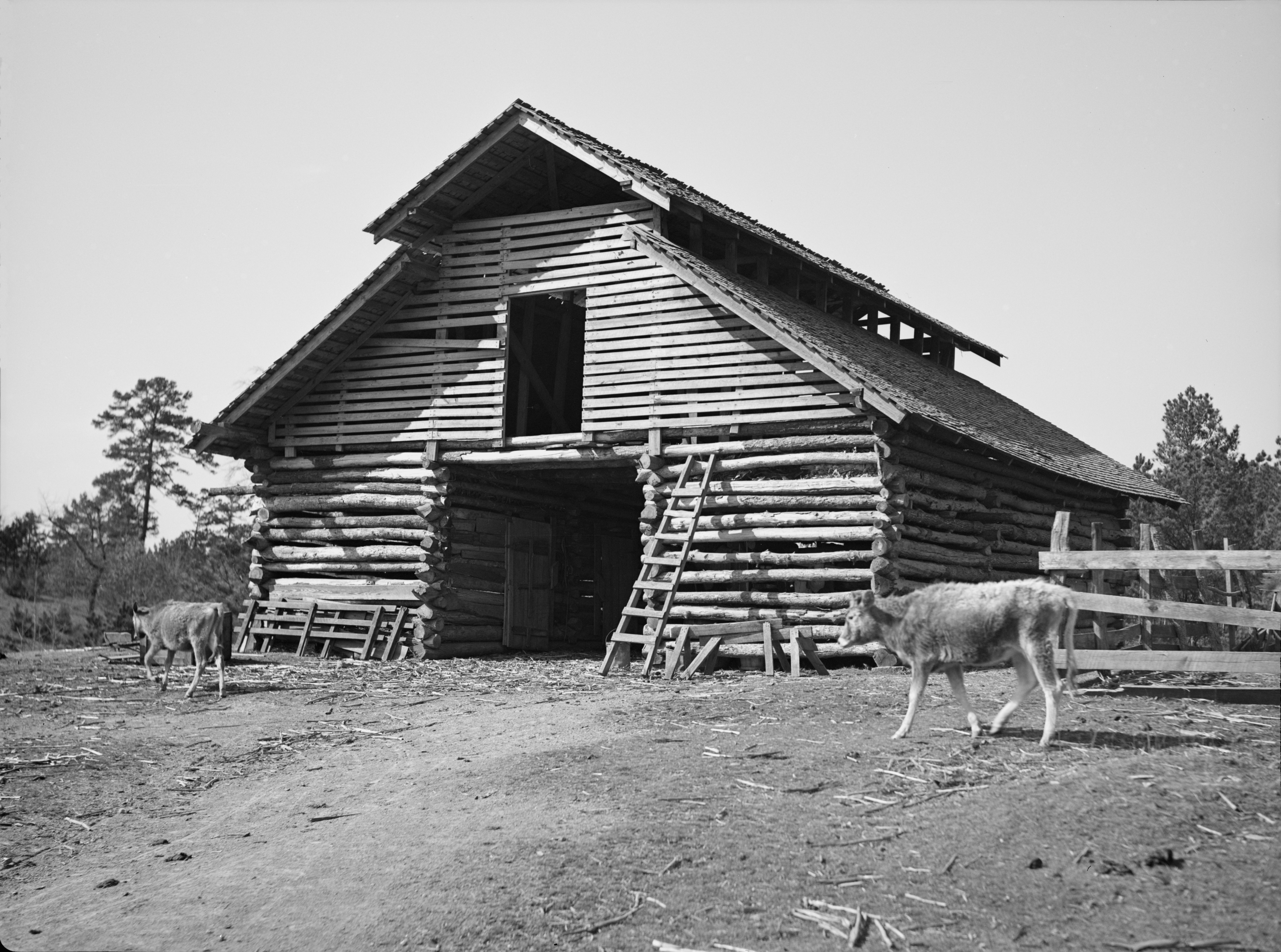
Barn on tenant's farm in Walker County, Alabama, 1937

Tenant farming characterized the cotton and tobacco production in the post-Civil War South. As the agricultural economy plummeted in the early 1930s, all farmers were badly hurt but the tenant farmers and sharecroppers experienced the worst of it.

To accomplish its goal of parity (raising crop prices to where they were in the golden years of 1909–1914), the Act reduced crop production. The Act accomplished this by offering landowners acreage reduction contracts, by which they agreed not to grow cotton on a portion of their land. By law, they were required to pay the tenant farmers and sharecroppers on their land a portion of the money; but after Southern Democrats in Congress complained, the Secretary of Agriculture surrendered and reinterpreted section 7 to no longer send checks to sharecroppers directly, hurting the tenants. The farm wage workers who worked directly for the landowner suffered the greatest unemployment as a result of the Act. Researchers concluded that the statistics after the Act took effect "indicate a consistent and widespread tendency for cotton croppers and, to a considerable extent, tenants to decrease in numbers between 1930 and 1935. The decreases among Negroes were consistently greater than those among whites." Another consequence was that the historic high levels of mobility from year to year declined sharply, as tenants and croppers tended to stay longer with the same landowner.

According to researchers Frey and Smith, "To the extent that the AAA control-program has been responsible for the increased price [of cotton], we conclude that it has increased the amount of goods and services consumed by the cotton tenants and croppers area." Furthermore, the landowners typically let the tenants and croppers use the land taken out of cotton production for their own personal use in growing food and feed crops, which further increased their standard of living. Another consequence was that the historic high levels of turnover from year to year declined sharply, as tenants and croppers tend to stay with the same landowner. These researchers concluded, "As a rule, planters seem to prefer Negroes to whites as tenants and croppers."

However, according to researcher Harold C. Hoffsommer, many landlords were concerned that aid given directly to tenant farmers would have a "demoralizing effect." An article appearing in the St. Louis Dispatch in 1935, quoted Hoffsommer's survey conducted for the Federal Emergency Relief Administration.

Tenant demoralization from relief had either one or both of two meanings to the landlord. In the first place, it might have been a fear that the tenant would escape from under his influence. It is probably not too much to say that the cropper system can only be maintained by the subordination of the tenant group. If the cropper were to become self-directing and take over his own affairs, the system would necessarily crumble. Hence anything that disrupts dependence is demoralizing. In the second place, the landlords were influenced by the belief that when members of any group are given privileges to which they are unaccustomed, they are likely in their inexperience to abuse them for a time. There can be no question that a considerable number of the sharecroppers reacted in this fashion, when under the Civil Works Administration, for example, they received more cash in a single week than they had been accustomed to receiving in an entire year. In their inexperience the money was spent foolishly and from this standpoint the outcome was demoralizing.

Delta and Providence Cooperative Farms in Mississippi and the Southern Tenant Farmers Union were organized in the 1930s principally as a response to the hardships imposed on sharecroppers and tenant farmers.

Although the Act stimulated American agriculture, it was not without its faults. For example, it disproportionately benefited large farmers and food processors, with lesser benefits to small farmers and sharecroppers. In his criticisms of the Act, Henry Wallace's assistant Paul Appleby described it as "an organization whose function had to do with the more successful farmers by and large." With the spread of cotton-picking machinery after 1945, there was an exodus of small farmers and croppers to the city.

== Thomas Amendment ==
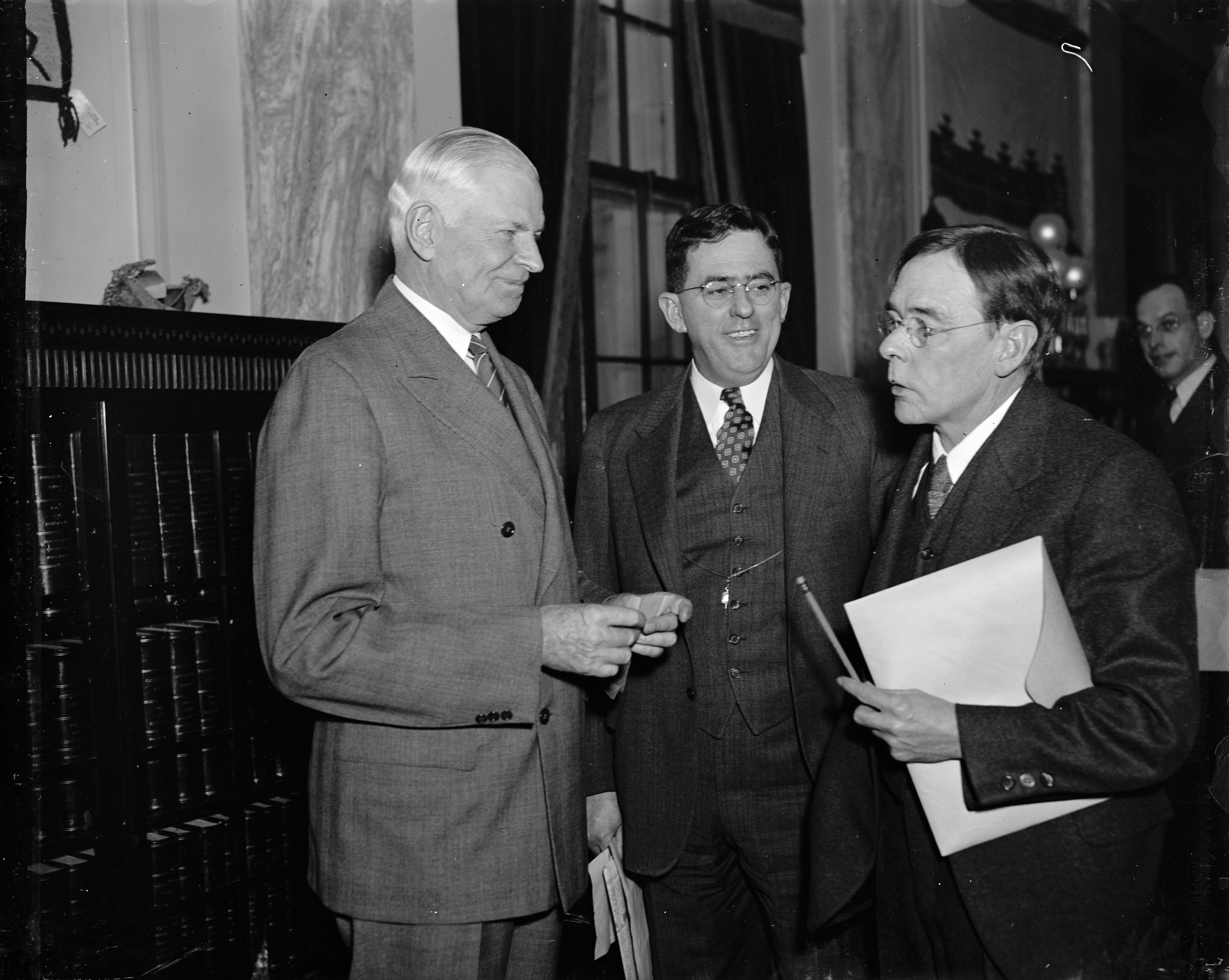
Senator Elmer Thomas (left) with Claude M. Hurst and John Collier, members of the Senate Indian Affairs Committee, and unassociated (directly) with the Thomas Amendment.

Attached as Title III to the Act, the Thomas Amendment became the 'third horse' in the New Deal's farm relief bill. Drafted by Senator Elmer Thomas of Oklahoma, the amendment blended populist easy-money views with the theories of the New Economics. Thomas wanted a stabilized "honest dollar," one that would be fair to debtor and creditor alike.

The Amendment said that whenever the President desired currency expansion, he must first authorize the Federal Open Market Committee of the Federal Reserve to purchase up to $3 billion of federal obligations. Should open market operations prove insufficient, the President had several options. He could have the U.S. Treasury issue up to $3 billion in greenbacks, reduce the gold content of the dollar by as much as 50 percent, or accept 100 million dollars in silver at a price not to exceed fifty cents per ounce in payment of World War I debts owed by European nations.

The Thomas Amendment was used sparingly. The treasury received limited amounts of silver in payment for war debts from World War I. On 21 December 1933, Roosevelt ratified the London Agreement on Silver (adopted at the World Economic and Monetary Conference in London on 20 July 1933). At the same time, Roosevelt issued Proclamation 2067, ordering the United States mints to buy the entire domestic production of newly mined silver at 64.5¢ per ounce. "Roosevelt's most dramatic use of the Thomas amendment" came on 31 January 1934, when he decreased the gold content of the dollar to 15 5/21 grains (0.98741 grams) .900 fine gold, or 59.06 per cent of the previous fixed content (25 8/10 grains, or 1.6718 grams). "However, wholesale prices still continued to climb. Possibly the most significant expansion brought on by the Thomas Amendment may have been the growth of governmental power over monetary policy.

The impact of this amendment was to reduce the amount of silver that was being held by private citizens (presumably as a hedge against inflation or collapse of the financial system) and increase the amount of circulating currency.

== Ruled unconstitutional ==
On January 6, 1936, the Supreme Court decided in United States v. Butler that the act was unconstitutional for levying this tax on the processors only to have it paid back to the farmers. Regulation of agriculture was deemed a state power under the 10th amendment. As such, the federal government could not force states to adopt the Agricultural Adjustment Act due to lack of jurisdiction. However, the Agricultural Adjustment Act of 1938 remedied these technical issues and the farm program continued.

== Ware Group ==
The following employees of the AAA were alleged members of the Ware Group of Soviet spies.

The group was identified by Whittaker Chambers during subpoenaed testimony to HUAC on August 3, 1948: Harold Ware, John Abt, Lee Pressman, Alger Hiss, Donald Hiss, Nathan Witt, Henry Collins, Marion Bachrach (husband Howard Bachrach was also an AAA employee), John Herrmann, and Nathaniel Weyl.

== See also ==
- Agricultural Adjustment Act Amendment of 1935
- Agricultural Adjustment Act of 1938
- Federal Emergency Relief Administration, May 1933
- Federal Surplus Relief Corporation
- Commodity Credit Corporation
- Jones–Connally Act 1934
- Jones–Costigan amendment
