= Agricultural Credit Act of 1987 =

United States Federal act

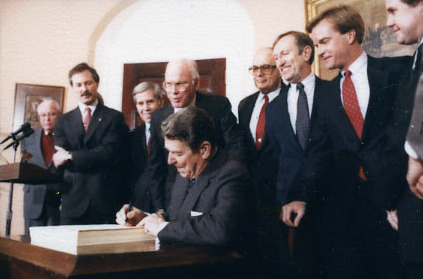
President Ronald Reagan signing the act

In United States federal agriculture legislation, the Agricultural Credit Act of 1987 (Pub. L. 100–233, 101 Stat. 1568, enacted January 6, 1988) was enacted in response to the severe financial crisis of the early- to mid-1980s, which affected both farmers and their lending institutions.

The Act authorized a $4 billion financial assistance package for financially vulnerable institutions of the Farm Credit System (FCS), protected the full value of FCS borrower stock when retired, established a permanent insurance mechanism to ensure the repayment of funds borrowed by the FCS for lending purposes, required the FCS and USDA’s Farmers Home Administration (now, the Farm Service Agency) to restructure severely delinquent farm loans that met certain criteria, mandated FCS consolidation, and established a secondary market for farm real estate loans, including creation of the Federal Agricultural Mortgage Corporation (Farmer Mac).

== See also ==
- Agriculture Mediation Program
- Financial Institutions Reform, Recovery, and Enforcement Act of 1989
