= Farm Credit System =

Network of financial institutions

The Farm Credit System (FCS) in the United States is a nationwide network of borrower-owned lending institutions and specialized service organizations. The Farm Credit System provides more than $373 billion (as of 2022) in loans, leases, and related services to farmers, ranchers, rural homeowners, aquatic producers, timber harvesters, agribusinesses, and agricultural and rural utility cooperatives. As of 2021, the Farm Credit System provides more than 45% of the total market share of US farm business debt.

Congress established the Farm Credit System in 1916 to provide a reliable source of credit for farmers and ranchers, by making loans to qualified borrowers at competitive rates and providing insurance and related services.

The Farm Credit Administration reported that system institutions made 175,068 loans with commitments totaling $38.2 billion in 2025 across its seven mutually exclusive categories for young, beginning, and small farmers. These represented 56.3 percent of loans made and 25.5 percent of loan volume in the agency's reporting, which covers real estate mortgages, production and intermediate-term loans, and processing and marketing loans. The dollar figures include disbursed funds and undisbursed commitments available to borrowers.

== Authority and oversight ==
Congress established the Farm Credit System as a government-sponsored enterprise (GSE) when it enacted the Federal Farm Loan Act of 1916. Current authority is granted by the Farm Credit Act of 1971. The Farm Credit System is considered the first GSE chartered by the United States.

The Farm Credit Administration (FCA), an agency of the federal government created in 1933, provides regulatory oversight for the Farm Credit System. The Farm Credit System Insurance Corporation (FCSIC), established by the Agricultural Credit Act of 1987, insures the timely repayment of principal and interest on FCS debt securities.

== Wholesale system banks ==
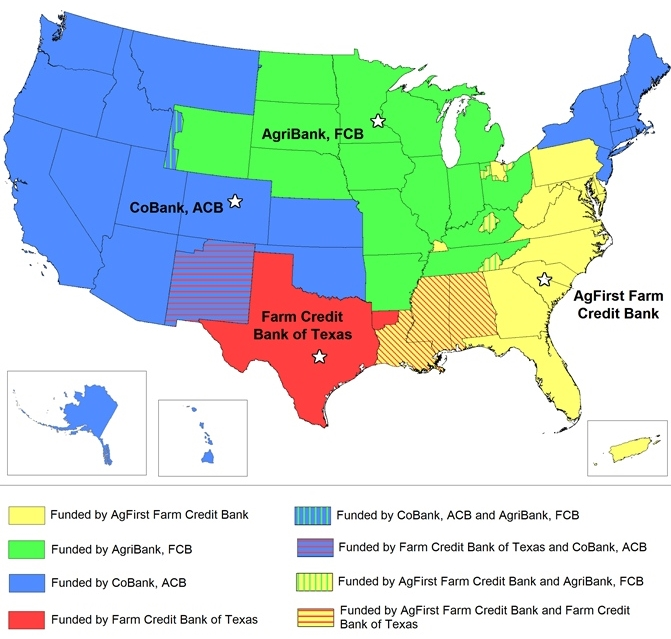
Farm Credit Bank (and Agricultural Credit Bank) charter territories

=== Farm Credit Bank (FCB) ===
Three Farm Credit Banks (FCBs) provide loan funds to 50 Agricultural Credit Associations (ACAs) and one Federal Land Credit Association (FLCA). In turn, ACAs make short-, intermediate-, and long-term loans, while FLCAs make long-term loans, to farmers, ranchers, producers and harvesters of aquatic products, rural residents for housing, and certain farm-related businesses.

The three FCBs are:

- AgFirst
- AgriBank
- Farm Credit Bank of Texas

There is also one Agricultural Credit Bank, with the authority of a FCB (and a Bank for Cooperatives):

- CoBank

FCBs were created on July 6, 1988, in 11 of the 12 then-existing Farm Credit System (FCS) districts, by merging the Federal Land Bank (FLB) and the Federal Intermediate Credit Bank (FICB) in each of those districts. Those mergers were required by the Agricultural Credit Act of 1987.

=== Bank for Cooperatives (BC) ===
A Bank for Cooperatives (BC) provides lending and other financial services to farmer-owned cooperatives, rural utilities (electric and telephone), and rural sewer and water systems. A BC is also authorized to finance U.S. agricultural exports and provide international banking services for farmer-owned cooperatives.

CoBank is an Agricultural Credit Bank (ACB) and has the authority of a Farm Credit Bank and a BC. The last standalone BC, the St. Paul Bank for Cooperatives, merged into CoBank on July 1, 1999.

== Retail lending associations ==
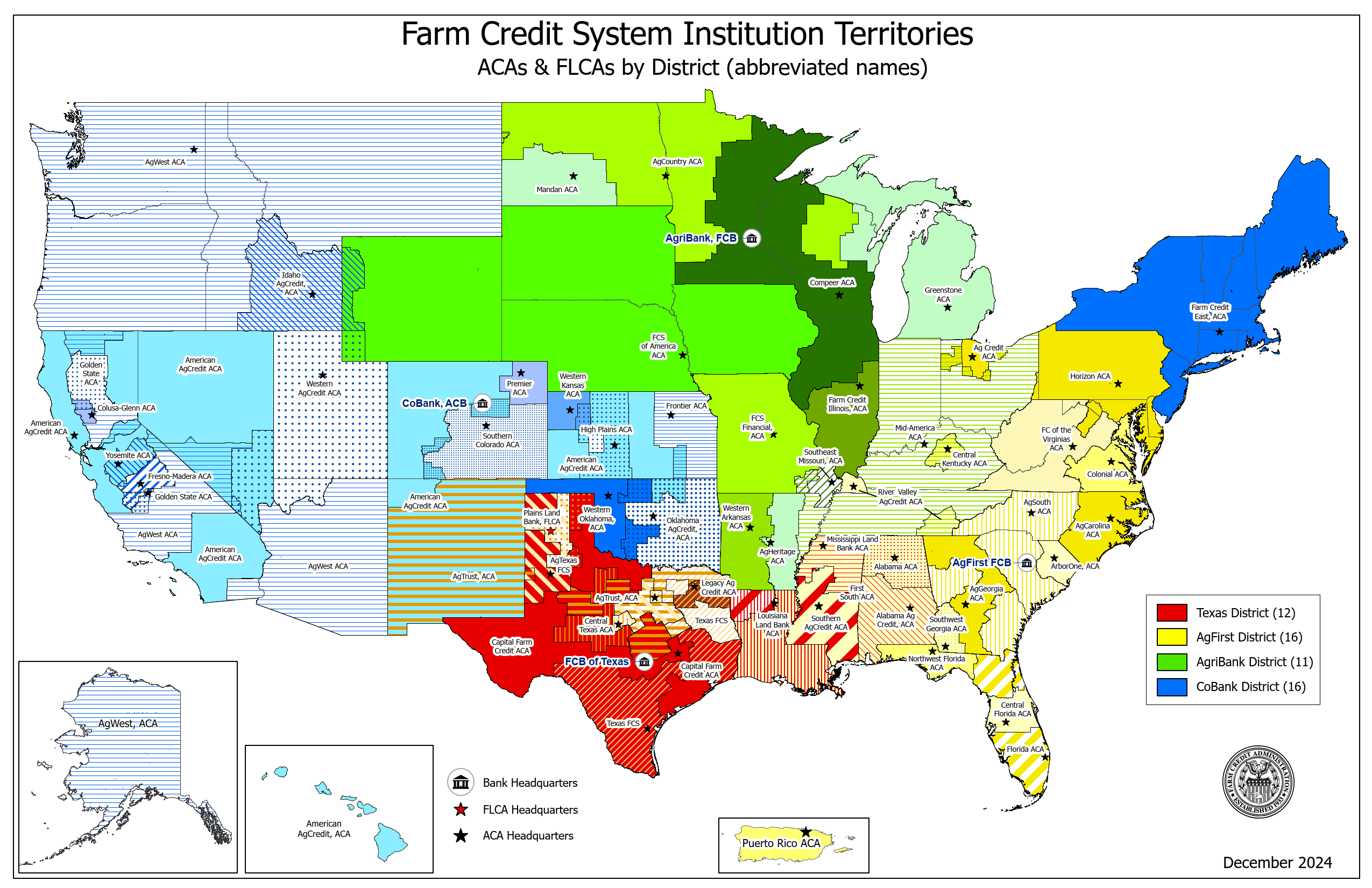
Agricultural Credit Association (and two Federal Land Credit Association) charter territories

=== Agricultural Credit Association (ACA) ===
An Agricultural Credit Association (ACA) is the result of the merger of a FLBA or a FLCA and a PCA and has the combined authority of the two institutions. An ACA obtains funds from a FCB or an ACB to provide short-, intermediate-, and long-term credit to farmers, ranchers, producers and harvesters of aquatic products, and to rural residents for housing. An ACA also makes loans to these borrowers for basic processing and marketing activities, and to farm-related businesses. All ACAs operate with a parent-subsidiary structure, with the ACA as the parent and a wholly owned PCA and FLCA as subsidiaries.

=== Federal Land Credit Association (FLCA) ===
The Agricultural Credit Act of 1987 authorized an FCS bank to transfer its direct-lending authority for long-term mortgage loans to a FLBA. These Associations are designated as FLCAs. Unlike a FLBA, a FLCA owns its loan assets. An FLCA obtains funds from an FCS bank to make and service long-term mortgage loans to farmers and ranchers, and to rural residents for housing. An FLCA also makes loans to these borrowers for basic processing and marketing activities, and to farm-related businesses. Most present-day FLCAs are now subsidiaries of ACAs. Only nine FLCAs operate independently.

== Funding institutions ==
=== Federal Farm Credit Banks Funding Corporation ===
The Federal Farm Credit Banks Funding Corporation issues a variety of Federal Farm Credit Banks Consolidated Systemwide Debt Securities (Farm Credit Debt Securities) on behalf of the Farm Credit System Banks with a broad range of maturities and structures.

=== Federal Agricultural Mortgage Corporation (Farmer Mac) ===
The Federal Agricultural Mortgage Corporation (Farmer Mac) is a government-sponsored enterprise with the mission of providing a secondary market for agricultural real estate and rural housing mortgage loans.

== Historical institutions ==
There are several institutions that have been authorized by law but which have been subsumed by other institutions, which usually retain their authority.

=== FCS Financial Assistance Corporation ===
Created by the Agricultural Credit Act of 1987 and chartered in 1988, the Assistance Corporation provided capital to the FCS by purchasing preferred stock from FCS institutions that received financial assistance authorized by the FCS Assistance Board. The Assistance Corporation provided approximately $1.26 billion before its authority to raise additional funds expired on December 31, 1992.

Following statutory requirements, the Assistance Corporation repaid its obligations in June 2005 and received a final audit in September 2005. After determining that the Assistance Corporation had completed its statutory mission, complied with applicable laws and regulations, and operated in a safe and sound manner, the FCA Board canceled the charter of the Assistance Corporation as of December 31, 2006.

=== Federal Intermediate Credit Bank (FICB) ===
The Agricultural Credits Act of 1923 provided for the creation of 12 FICBs to discount farmers' short- and intermediate-term notes made by commercial banks, livestock loan companies, thrift institutions, and, beginning in 1933, Production Credit Associations. On July 6, 1988, 11 of the 12 then-existing FICBs merged with the Federal Land Banks in their respective districts to form Farm Credit Banks. The mergers were required by the Agricultural Credit Act of 1987. The last remaining FICB, the FICB of Jackson, merged with the FCB of Columbia, which has since been renamed AgFirst Farm Credit Bank on October 1, 1993.

1921 newspaper ad for loans to farmers available under the program

=== Federal Land Bank (FLB) ===
The Federal Farm Loan Act of 1916 provided for the establishment of 12 FLBs to provide long-term mortgage credit to farmers and ranchers, and later to rural homebuyers. On May 20, 1988, the FLB of Jackson was placed in receivership and liquidated. On July 6, 1988, the 11 remaining FLBs merged with the Federal Intermediate Credit Banks in their respective districts to form Farm Credit Banks. The mergers were required by the Agricultural Credit Act of 1987.

=== Federal Land Bank Association (FLBA) ===
An FLBA was a lending agent for a Federal Land Bank and later the Farm Credit Bank and the Agricultural Credit Bank. FLBAs originated and serviced long-term mortgage loans to farmers and ranchers, and to rural residents for housing. FLBAs did not own the loan assets but originated loans on behalf of the Federal Land Banks/FCS banks with which they were affiliated. As of October 1, 2000, there are no longer any FLBAs in the FCS. They either merged with Production Credit Associations to form ACAs or became direct-lender Federal Land Credit Associations when Farm Credit Banks transferred their authority to make long-term mortgage loans to their affiliated FLBAs.

=== Production Credit Association (PCA) ===
The Farm Credit Act of 1933 authorized farmers to organize PCAs to deliver short- and intermediate-term loans to farmers and ranchers, and to rural residents for housing. A PCA also makes loans to these borrowers for basic processing and marketing activities, and to farm-related businesses. A PCA obtains funds from an FCS bank to lend to its members. PCAs own their loan assets. All present-day PCAs are now subsidiaries of ACAs.

== 1980s agricultural crisis ==
In the 1980s, the United States faced a major farm crisis. With low crop prices, and the value of farm land falling, many farmers were unable to service their debts. This severely affected the Farm Credit System, which experienced losses of $2.7 billion in 1985. Investor confidence in FCS bonds declined, with increased spreads over U.S. treasury debt. The federal government responded by amending the Farm Credit Act of 1971 in 1985 and 1986, and then enacting the Agricultural Credit Act of 1987 to help strengthen the FCS.

== Criticism ==
The Farm Credit System and a number of FCS banks have faced criticism of their practices. In March 2016, the FCS Funding Corporation disclosed that 45.5% of total FCS taxpayer-subsidized loans outstanding as of year-end 2015 had been borrowed by only 4,458 borrowers. Critics, such as the American Bankers Association, also charge that FCS banks only make large loans (more than $1 million) and are making loans with tax-exempt earnings that have almost nothing to do with farming, such as to Verizon Communications and Cracker Barrel; defenders justified CoBank ACB loans to Verizon and Frontier Communications because they provide landline voice service, Internet and wireless access and other services to rural areas.

== See also ==
- Farm Credit Administration
- The Farm Credit Council
- Farmer Mac
- Grange movement
