= Government-sponsored enterprise =

Type of financial services corporation created by the United States Congress

A government-sponsored enterprise (GSE) is a type of financial services corporation created by the United States Congress. Their intended function is to enhance the flow of credit to targeted sectors of the economy, to make those segments of the capital market more efficient and transparent, and to reduce the risk to investors and other suppliers of capital. The desired effect of the GSEs is to enhance the availability and reduce the cost of credit to the targeted borrowing sectors primarily by reducing the risk of capital losses to investors: agriculture, home finance and education. Well known GSEs are the Federal National Mortgage Association, known as Fannie Mae, and the Federal Home Loan Mortgage Corporation, or Freddie Mac.

Congress created the first GSE in 1916 with the creation of the Farm Credit System. It initiated GSEs in the home finance segment of the economy with the creation of the Federal Home Loan Banks in 1932; and it targeted education when it chartered Sallie Mae in 1972 (although Congress allowed Sallie Mae to relinquish its government sponsorship and become a fully private institution via legislation in 1995). The residential mortgage borrowing segment is by far the largest of the borrowing segments in which the GSEs operate. GSEs hold or pool approximately $5 trillion worth of mortgages.

== Backing of US currency ==
The U.S. Congress has specified that Federal Reserve Banks must hold collateral equal in value to the Federal Reserve notes that the Federal Reserve Bank puts into circulation. This collateral is chiefly held in the form of U.S. Treasury, federal agency, and government-sponsored enterprise securities.

== Business ==
Congress established GSEs to improve the efficiency of capital markets and to overcome market imperfections which prevent funds from moving easily from suppliers of funds to areas of high loan demand. This is primarily done by some form of guarantee that limits the risk of capital losses to those supplying funds. Presently, GSEs primarily act as financial intermediaries to assist lenders and borrowers in housing and agriculture. Fannie Mae and Freddie Mac, the two most prominent GSEs, purchase mortgages and package them into mortgage-backed securities (MBS), which carry the financial backing of Fannie Mae or Freddie Mac. Because of this GSE financial backing, these MBS are particularly attractive to investors and are also eligible to trade in the "to-be-announced," or "TBA" market.

In addition, the GSEs created a secondary market in loans through guarantees, bonding and securitization. This has allowed primary market debt issuers to increase loan volume and decrease the risks associated with individual loans. This also provides standardized instruments (securitized securities) for investors.

== Ownership and implicit guarantee ==
Some of the GSEs (such as Fannie Mae and Freddie Mac) have been privately owned but publicly chartered; others, such as the Federal Home Loan Banks, are owned by the corporations that use their services. GSE securities carry no explicit government guarantee of creditworthiness, but lenders grant them favorable interest rates, and the buyers of their securities offer them high prices. This is partly due to an "implicit guarantee" that the government would not allow such important institutions to fail or default on debt. This perception has allowed Fannie Mae and Freddie Mac to save an estimated $2 billion per year in borrowing costs. This implicit guarantee was tested by the subprime mortgage crisis, which caused the U.S. government to bail out and put into conservatorship Fannie Mae and Freddie Mac in September, 2008.

Every GSE prospectus contains the following text, or something virtually identical, in bold letters, and has since before the sub-prime loans were originated: "Neither the certificates nor interest on the certificates are guaranteed by the United States, and they do not constitute a debt or obligation of the United States or any of its agencies of instrumentalities other than Fannie Mae." Critics of the GSEs have challenged the "implicit guarantee" since before the sub-prime crisis.

== List of GSEs ==
=== Housing ===
- The eleven Federal Home Loan Banks (FHLBanks) (1932)
- Federal National Mortgage Association (Fannie Mae) (1938)
- Federal Home Loan Mortgage Corporation (Freddie Mac) (1970)

=== Veteran ===
- National Veteran Business Development Corporation (1999)

=== Farming ===
- Federal Farm Credit Banks (FCBanks) (1916)
- Federal Agricultural Mortgage Corporation (Farmer Mac) (1987)

=== Education ===
- SLM Corporation (Sallie Mae) (1972–1995)

== See also ==
- Crown corporations of Canada — Canada Mortgage and Housing Corporation
- Mortgage industry of Denmark
- Government National Mortgage Association
- State-owned enterprise
- Government-owned corporation
- Independent agencies of the United States federal government
- Nationalization
- Public Sector Undertaking (Indian state enterprise)
- Public company (public corporation)
- State ownership
- Quasi-corporation
- SLM Corporation, also known as Sallie Mae, a former GSE
- List of state-owned enterprises of New Zealand
- State-owned enterprises of the United States
- Statsforetak (Norwegian state enterprise)
- Unitary enterprise (Russian state enterprise)
- Volkseigener Betrieb (East German state enterprise)
