= O. E. Lofthus =

American politician (1868–1960)

Ole E. Lofthus
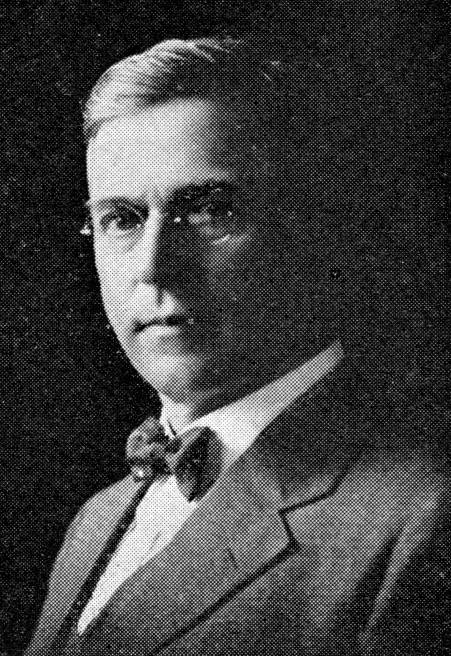
- Lofthus in C. 1919

North Dakota State Examiner
- In office June 1919 – November 1921
- Governor: Lynn Frazier
- Preceded by: James R. Waters
- Succeeded by: Gilbert Semingson

Personal details
- Born: July 7, 1868 Nicollet County, Minnesota, U.S.
- Died: January 16, 1960 (aged 91) Los Angeles, California, U.S.
- Party: Nonpartisan League
- Other political affiliations: Socialist
- Spouse: Christine Evenson (m. 1893; died 1935)

Ole E. Lofthus (July 7, 1868 – January 16, 1960) was a teacher, banker, and politician who served as North Dakota State Examiner from 1919 to 1921.

== Biography ==
=== Early years ===
Ole E. Lofthus was born on July 7, 1868, in Nicollet County, Minnesota. He was born to Norwegian parents, Ole O. Lofthus and Albertina (Beck) Lofthus. His father was a veteran of the Civil War. O. E. Lofthus grew up and attended school in Minnesota. He later became a schoolteacher and farmer for several years.

Sometime between 1890 and 1900, Lofthus moved to North Dakota. In 1907, he opened the First State Bank of Kloten, North Dakota, and worked as the bank's cashier until 1919. He also operated a farm near Kloten.

=== Politics ===
Lofthus was a believer in progressivism, and in the early 1900s, he became involved in the Socialist Party of Minnesota. In 1904, he unsuccessfully ran as the Socialist candidate for Lieutenant Governor of Minnesota. In 1906, he unsuccessfully ran as the Socialist candidate for Governor of Minnesota. In both of these elections, due to a state law restricting the use of the word "Socialist" on ballots, he was listed under the "Public Ownership Party."

At some point after his foray into Minnesota politics, he turned his attention to politics in North Dakota. In 1914, he ran unsuccessfully for the North Dakota Senate, running as a candidate in Nelson County. He became involved with the Socialist Party of North Dakota and ran as their candidate for North Dakota State Treasurer in 1916. Lofthus came in a distant third behind incumbent John Steen, running as a Republican, and Patrick M. Casey, running as the Nonpartisan League (NPL) candidate under the Democratic Party.

Around this time, the mid to late 1910s, saw the rise of the NPL in the state. Many members of the North Dakota Socialist Party left to join the NPL, Lofthus among them. The NPL had great appeal to many residents of North Dakota, and its membership and influence grew quickly. By 1919, the NPL had control over all three branches of state government.

=== North Dakota State Examiner ===
In June 1919, NPL Governor Lynn Frazier appointed Lofthus to be State Examiner, or state bank examiner. Lofthus replaced the outgoing James R. Waters, who became the first manager of the newly established Bank of North Dakota.

Only a few months after his appointment, Lofthus, as State Examiner, became engrossed with the issue over the Scandinavian American Bank in Fargo, which was one of the many controversies facing the NPL. The bank, which first opened in early 1911, was purchased by the NPL in October 1917. Allegedly, the bank was purchased by Porter Kimball, a former state legislator and wealthy farmer, and John J. Hastings, a former secretary of the NPL, at the direction of NPL leaders A. C. Townley and William Lemke. Lemke would later publicly deny this claim. The Scandinavian American Bank would be one of many banks that the NPL would eventually control.

Toward the end of September 1919, Lofthus was sent by the State Banking Board to Florida to investigate the U.S. Sisal Trust Company, which was a business venture with ties to the NPL. The State Banking Board consisted of William Langer (Attorney General), Thomas Hall (Secretary of State), and Lynn Frazier (Governor). Langer and Hall, making up a majority of the board, had been growing dissatisfied with the NPL's leadership.

Langer and Hall, already suspicious of the NPL and its banking practices because of previous issues with a bank in Valley City, used the power of the State Banking Board to investigate the Scandinavian American Bank of Fargo. In April 1919, Deputy Examiner P. E. Halldorson reviewed the bank and warned that it was in serious condition.

Also at the end of September 1919, coincidentally when Lofthus was temporary out of the state, Halldorson and Assistant Attorney General Albert E. Sheets arrived in Fargo to conduct another review of the bank. They concluded the bank was not financially stable and had excessive loans. The State Banking Board soon called a meeting and declared the bank insolvent, with Frazier voting against closing the bank and Langer and Hall voting for it. Halldorson was named temporarily receiver.

Lofthus quickly returned to the state and appealed, along with William Lemke, to the North Dakota Supreme Court so Lofthus could be put in charge of the bank. In early October 1919, the Supreme Court sided with Lofthus, and he took control from Halldorson. Lofthus would later fire Halldorson for his role in closing the bank.

Lofthus and other allies of the NPL disregarded the report from Halldorson and Sheets and conducted their own investigation. They concluded there were some excessive loans, but the bank was financially stable and should never have been declared insolvent. The pro-NPL press declared Langer and Hall tried to destroy the bank for political reasons.

The bank would be reopened in late October 1919. However, the bank closed permanently in February 1921. The scandal surrounding the bank would drag on for years, and many NPL members (like Townley), state officials (such as F. W. Cathro, Manager of the Bank of North Dakota), and bank employees (such as Halvor J. Hagen, President of the Scandinavian American Bank) were indicted or called to testify in various legislative hearings. Lofthus was indicted on charges of falsifying reports and perjury, but the charges would be dismissed.

By the end of 1919, scandals and infighting had weakened the NPL. In October 1921, the opponents of the NPL, particularly the Independent Voters Association (IVA), held a successful recall election that removed all members of the Industrial Commission, all of whom were NPL members (Gov. Frazier, Attorney General Lemke, and Commissioner of Agriculture and Labor Hagan).

Right before the new administration was set to take over the state, Lofthus resigned, and Gov. Frazier appointed Gilbert Semingson to replace him. It was largely assumed that Lofthus resigned before the newly elected governor, R. A. Nestos could remove him from office.

=== Later years ===
In the years following his resignation, Lofthus lived in Minnesota for many years (in Hawley and Minneapolis). He eventually moved to Los Angeles, California, where he remained until his death on January 16, 1960.

== Personal life ==
On April 5, 1893, O. E. Lofthus married Christine (or Christena) Evenson in Big Stone County, Minnesota. The couple had four children: Owen, Floyd, Adeline, and Irene.

== See also ==
- 1904 Minnesota lieutenant gubernatorial election
- 1906 Minnesota gubernatorial election

Party political offices
Preceded by Jay E. Nash	Public Ownership nominee for Governor of Minnesota; 1906	Succeeded by Beecher Moore
Political offices
Preceded by James R. Waters	North Dakota State Examiner; 1919–1921	Succeeded by Gilbert Semingson
