= Halvor J. Hagen =

American banker

- Born: 1860; Trondhjem, Norway
- Died: 1927–1930
- Occupation: Banker
- Title: President of the Scandinavian American Bank of Fargo
- Term: 1911–1920
- Spouse: Amy Wood

Halvor J. Hagen (1860 – death date unknown) was a prominent Norwegian-American banker from North Dakota who served as President of the Scandinavian American Bank in Fargo from 1911 to 1920. He also served on the North Dakota Depositors' Guaranty Fund Commission from 1919 to 1920.

== Early years ==
Halvor J. Hagen was born in Trondhjem, Norway, in 1860 to parents Jens and Gunhild Hagen. By 1872, the family had immigrated to the United States, settling in Wisconsin. In 1873, the family moved again to Dakota Territory (North Dakota), settling near Fort Abercrombie.

Hagen attended Willmar Seminary in Minnesota before returning to the Abercrombie area to farm. In 1892, he entered the banking industry, becoming involved in the National Bank of Wahpeton in Wahpeton, North Dakota. He then helped to organize the First State Bank of Abercrombie and served as its president.

== Scandinavian American Bank ==
=== Bank opens ===
In 1910, Hagen organized a new bank and became its president. On January 3, 1911, the Scandinavian American Bank opened for business on the corner of Broadway and 1st Avenue in Fargo, North Dakota. Under the leadership of Hagen, the bank prospered over the next several years.

=== Nonpartisan League bank ===
By 1917, the Scandinavian American Bank of Fargo had caught the attention of the Nonpartisan League (NPL), a farmer-backed political movement started in North Dakota in 1915. Between 1916 and 1919, the NPL expanded into business and industry, and one venture involved securing controlling interest in banks across North Dakota.

In October 1917, Hagen sold the bulk of his stock in the bank to the NPL. The bank was indirectly purchased by the NPL through two prominent members: John J. Hastings and Porter Kimball. Hagen also sold his stock in a bank in Lisbon, North Dakota. Hastings and Kimball joined the bank's board of directors, and Hastings became a vice president. The Scandinavian American Bank was to function as the NPL's main bank.

The bank was allegedly purchased by Hastings and Kimball at the direction of A. C. Townley and William Lemke, two leaders of the NPL. However, Townley and Lemke both denied this accusation.

The bank continued to thrive under the NPL. Reports indicated that 1917 was a prosperous year for the bank, and in February 1918, the bank expanded and leased additional space.

Hagen also prospered under the NPL. He continued to serve as President of the Scandinavian American Bank. In December 1918, it was rumored that he might be appointed North Dakota State Examiner. Instead, in July 1919, Hagen was appointed by Governor Lynn J. Frazier to the Depositor's Guaranty Fund Commission.

=== The Langer Raid ===
As the NPL reorganized banks across North Dakota, certain state officials, particularly William Langer (Attorney General), Thomas Hall (Secretary of State), and Carl R. Kositzky (State Auditor), were growing suspicious of the NPL's banking practices. The three state officials had been allies of the NPL, but they were becoming dissatisfied with its leaders, especially Townley.

The method the NPL used to purchase some banks was controversial. The NPL, or at least some of its members, essentially borrowed money from the banks, and then turned around and used this money to buy the bank. The NPL was securing a controlling interest in these banks without putting any money into them.

Scandinavian American Bank advertisement, Fargo, N.D., 1917

Langer and Hall were in a position to investigate NPL banks, as majority members of the State Banking Board. In April 1919, P. E. Halldorson, Deputy State Examiner, reviewed the Scandinavian American Bank. In his report, he warned that the finances of the bank were in poor condition, but no action was taken.

In late September 1919, Halldorson and Albert E. Sheets, Jr. (Assistant Attorney General), in what would become known as the "Langer Raid," arrived at the Scandinavian American Bank to conduct a surprise audit. Halldorson and Sheets concluded the bank was not financially stable and had excessive loans of over $700,000. Several large loans had been given to the NPL, certain NPL members, and NPL subsidiaries.

One suspicious loan involved Hagen. He had used the bank to loan himself money as an agent of the Bering Sea Fisheries Company, which fished off the coast of Washington and Alaska. Allegedly, the only collateral used for the questionable loan was uncaught salmon.

After receiving the Halldorson-Sheets report, the State Banking Board hurriedly met. On October 2, 1919, Langer and Hall voted to declare the bank insolvent, and it was shut down. Gov. Frazier, the board's third member, voted against the decision. Conspicuously, the "Langer Raid" occurred when the State Examiner, Ole E. Lofthus, was on assignment in Florida. With Lofthus absent, the State Banking Board named Halldorson as the temporary receiver of the bank.

On October 4, 1919, two days after the bank was closed, warrants were issued for the arrest of Hagen and P. R. Sherman (Cashier). They were charged with making false statements to a state bank examiner and attempting to conceal the bank's insolvency. The two were arrested without incident, and their cases would go to court.

During all of this, the NPL frantically tried to contact Lofthus in Florida. Once he was finally located, he began his journey back.

As the NPL waited for Lofthus to return, William Lemke, acting as counsel for the bank, petitioned the North Dakota Supreme Court for a restraining order that would prohibit further interference from the State Banking Board. Lemke claimed Langer and Hall had exceeded their authority, and he stated that the authority to close banks and install receivers rested solely with the State Examiner.

On October 7, 1919, the Supreme Court granted Lemke's petition and issued a temporary ruling. Langer, Hall, Halldorson, and Sheets were restrained from any further interference with the bank, and they were ordered to surrender possession of the bank to Lofthus. Having finally returned from Florida, Lofthus assumed control of the bank as its new receiver on the morning of October 8.

Lofthus, a loyal supporter of the NPL, disregarded the report from Halldorson and Sheets and conducted his own investigation. He concluded there were some excessive loans, but the bank was financially stable and should never have been declared insolvent.

=== Bank scandal ===
The closing of the Scandinavian American Bank became a full-blown scandal for the NPL and for the bank itself, and its closure made headlines across the country.

Other banks, including the newly formed Bank of North Dakota, would also be dragged into the controversy. James R. Waters, Manager of the Bank of North Dakota and member of the NPL, was accused of warning the Scandinavian American Bank of upcoming audits while serving as the previous State Examiner.

After the North Dakota Supreme Court issued the restraining order, Langer petitioned the court to modify its ruling so he could retain certain evidence for the prosecution of Hagen and Sherman, the two officials at the bank who had been arrested. The Supreme Court denied Langer's request, and he was ordered to surrender everything to Lofthus, the State Examiner.

Before completely complying with this order, the attorney general's office released letters to the public. On October 8, 1919, Langer released the "Halliday letters" or the "shoot it to the other banks" letters. These two letters dated back to June 1918, and they were from Roy M. Halliday (then Chief Clerk in the State Examiner's Office) and sent to John J. Hastings (then Vice President of the Scandinavian American Bank). In the letters, Halliday provided advice on how the bank could deviously outwit state examiners and receive a positive audit report.

On October 11, 1919, Sheets (Assistant Attorney General) released two more letters to the public. The letters were allegedly discovered during the investigation after the bank was closed. The letters were allegedly authored by Hagen and Sherman and sent to A. C. Townley, President of the NPL. The letters suggested the bank was concerned about its financial situation back in May 1919 and feared "embarrassment and disgrace." The senders looked to Townley for financial assistance and inquired about alleged promises he made to get the bank through this "dangerous period."

=== Rally to save the bank ===
The NPL claimed that its enemies were attempting to destroy it and its program, and the "bank wreckers" were attempting to bankrupt the NPL by closing its bank. The Scandinavian American Bank was the NPL's main bank, so after its closure, the NPL began to feel financial pressure. The North Dakota executive committee of the NPL issued a statement claiming this was the "gravest crisis in the history of the [NPL]."

The NPL's answer to this crisis was to hold a mass rally in Fargo to save the bank and the NPL. On October 21, 1919, hundreds attended, and thousands of dollars were deposited into the bank.

On October 24, 1919, the North Dakota Supreme Court, having previously heard agreements about the bank, issued its ruling on the bank's status. In a win for the bank and the NPL, the Supreme Court gave the bank a clean bill of health, finding the insolvency "not justified and unreasonably so determined." The bank was allowed to reopen.

=== Conviction ===
A political cartoon depicting the jury's verdict in the Halvor J. Hagen trial. The jury finds him guilty. Gov. Frazier shouts "Not guilty" at the bottom.

In early December 1919, Hagen was found guilty of exhibiting false records to bank examiners. Sentencing was delayed pending an appeal.

The NPL-controlled state legislature, meeting in a special session around the same time as Hagen's conviction, was quick to support the NPL and condemned the actions of Langer and Hall for closing the bank. Additionally, the North Dakota Senate expunged a resolution proposed by Senator Fred W. Mees calling for the immediate resignation of Hagen from the Depositor's Guaranty Fund Commission.

=== Resignation ===
In early April 1920, Hagen and his counsel, James Manahan, petitioned for a new trial, claiming the jury was unfair and the evidence was insufficient. A month later, this request was granted. It is unclear what happened with this case, but Hagen did continue to serve as the bank's president.

Although his retrial was still pending, Gov. Frazier, in July 1920, reappointed Hagen to the Depositor's Guaranty Fund Commission.

In late 1920, Hagen quietly resigned as President of the Scandinavian American Bank. He was replaced by Emil J. Headland, who had served on the bank's board of directors for many years. Also around this time, Hagen resigned from the Depositor's Guaranty Fund Commission. Additionally, he left North Dakota and moved across the country to the Pacific Northwest.

=== Bank closes ===
In the early 1920s, falling grain prices and an economic downturn caused banks in the state to feel financial strain because obligations to them were not being met.

In February 1921, the Scandinavian American Bank, unable to meet its liabilities, was again forced to close. This time the closure would be permanent. It was one of the many banks in the state that would be forced to close.

== Later years ==
=== Murder of Marie Wick ===
In the early morning hours of June 7, 1921, Hagen arrived in Fargo on a train and went to the Prescott Hotel. He visited briefly with William Gummer, the hotel clerk sometime after 1:00 AM, and then he was checked into room 31. A few hours later, Marie Wick, an 18-year-old from northern Minnesota who was also a guest of the hotel in room 30, was found dead in her room. She had been sexually assaulted and brutally murdered.

Since Hagen had been staying in the room next to Wick, and there was an adjoining door between the two rooms, he was questioned by police. Hagen proclaimed his innocence and said he had heard nothing. He told investigators that he had been on the train for days and had gone straight to sleep upon his arrival. The police ruled Hagen out, since his fingerprints were not found at the crime scene, and he had no wounds linking him to the assault. Evidence also suggested that the adjoining door was locked and had not been opened in some time.

The blame for the murder eventually fell on Gummer, who had been the first to discover the body.

Later, in early 1922, Hagen had to testify during the murder trial as a witness for the state. On cross-examination, the defense attempted to cast doubt on his credibility. Hagen was asked about the controversies sounding him and the Scandinavian American Bank, and he gave evasive answers to these questions. On redirect, the prosecution pointedly asked Hagen if he had murdered Wick. "No, sir," he replied. Hagen also added that he had never been in Wick's room, nor had he ever seen her before.

Gummer was found guilty and sentenced to life in the State Penitentiary. Gummer always maintained his innocence. Over the next 20 years, additional affidavits and interviews pointed the blame elsewhere. In 1944, Gummer received a pardon and was released.

=== Bank trials ===
After the special recall election in October 1921, the Independent Voters Association (IVA), the opposition to the NPL, gained the upper hand in control over North Dakota's state government. The IVA-controlled Attorney General's Office launched a crusade against those who had been connect with the NPL's Scandinavian American Bank. Leading the charge was Sveinbjorn Johnson (Attorney General) and George F. Shafer (Assistant Attorney General).

A grand jury was convened in Cass County. On May 18, 1922, the grand jury adjourned. 35 indictments against 13 individuals were issued, one of whom was Hagen. In April 1923, nearly a year after the indictments, the charges were dismissed.

Shafer, now Attorney General, had another grand jury convened. In November 1923, the grand jury adjourned and new indictments were issued. The charges against the individuals included accepting deposits in an insolvent bank, making false entries, embezzlement, and making false statements to a state bank examiner. Hagen was again indicted.

In late March 1924, Hagen was found guilty of "knowingly permitting, conniving at, and being accessory to the receiving of money on deposit in an insolvent bank." He was sentenced to two and a half years in the state penitentiary.

=== Prison ===
Hagen and his counsel, Usher L. Burdick, petitioned for a retrial, but this was denied. Hagen continued to fight and appeal, but these all failed. In 1926, Hagen was forced to serve his sentence in the North Dakota State Penitentiary, becoming inmate 4387.

At the state prison in Bismarck, Hagen joined William Gummer, who had been convicted in 1922 of murdering Marie Wick. Hagen had been a witness in the trial.

Hagen was soon joined by John J. Hastings, former vice president of the Scandinavian American Bank, who had purchased the bank for the NPL in 1917. Hastings entered the state prison in October 1926, after being convicted of embezzlement and violating state banking laws in connection with the failure of a bank in New England, North Dakota, in 1925.

In August 1927, Hagen was released from prison early by the state pardon board because of his failing mental and physical health, and his wife had recently suffered a stroke and needed care.

=== Death ===
Hagen died sometime between 1927 and 1930. He was released from prison in 1927, and his wife is listed as a widow in the 1930 federal census. He was likely living in Washington at the time of his death.

== Personal life ==
On July 4, 1894, Hagen married Amy Wood in Stearns County, Minnesota. She had been a teacher in Abercrombie. Halvor and Amy had three children: Allen, Horace, and Naomi.

Hagen was active in the affairs of the Fargo, Wahpeton, and Abercrombie areas, being involved with the Fargo Commercial Club, Wahpeton Commercial Club, Sons of Norway, Masons, El Zagal Shriners, Red River Valley Old Settlers' Association, and he was one of the founders of Fort Abercrombie State Park. He also served as deputy assessor for Richland County, school board member, and city council member for Abercrombie. Additionally, he served on the board of the State Historical Society of North Dakota.

One of Hagen's brothers, Olaf J. Hagen, was a distinguished physician and surgeon in the Fargo-Moorhead area.
