= Henry Teigan =

American politician (1881–1941)

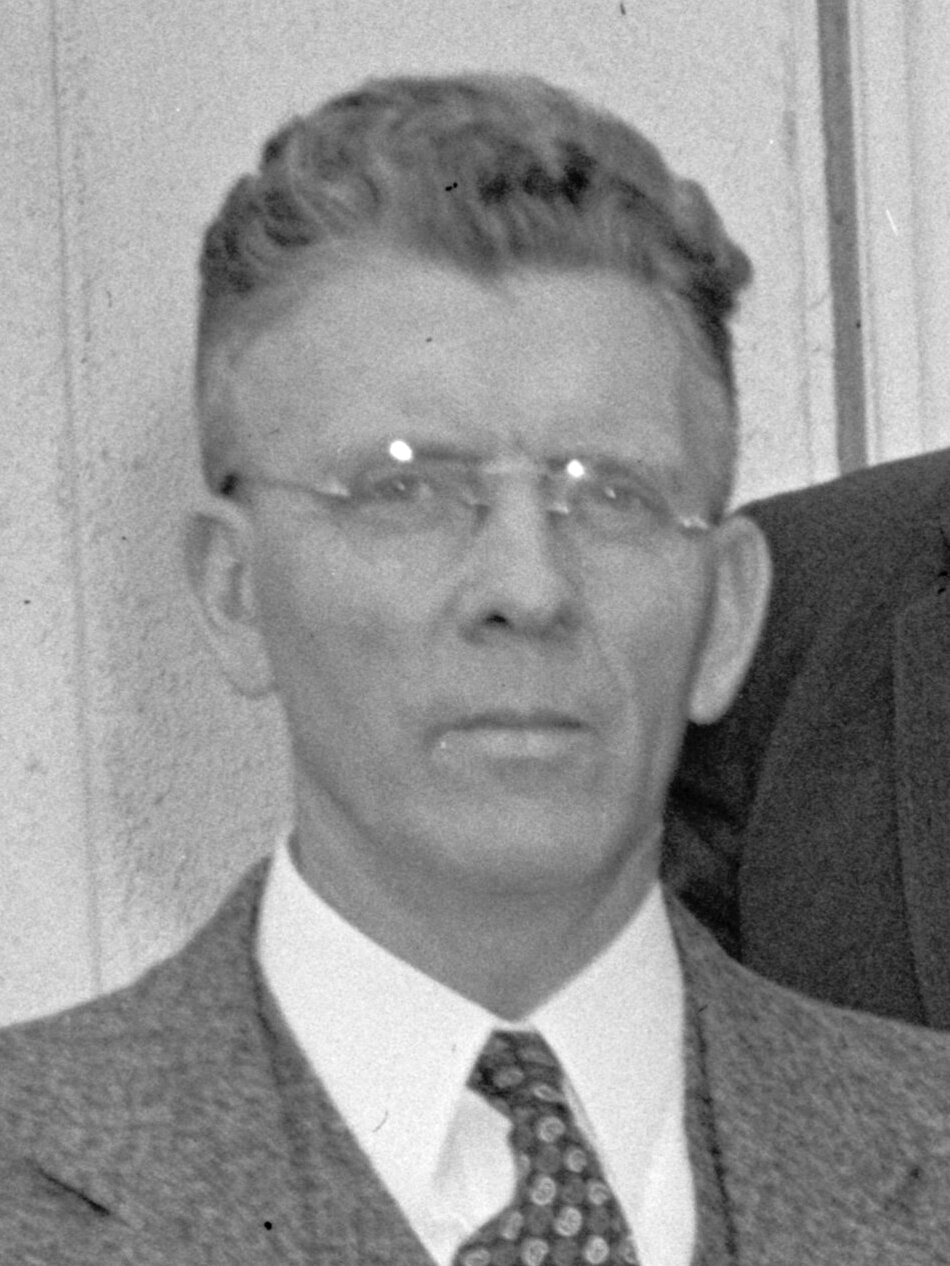
- Teigan in 1938

Member of the U.S. House of Representatives from Minnesota's 3rd district
- In office January 3, 1937 – January 3, 1939
- Preceded by: Ernest Lundeen
- Succeeded by: John G. Alexander

Member of the Minnesota Senate from the 29th district
- In office January 3, 1933 – January 6, 1935
- Preceded by: Lewis Duemke
- Succeeded by: Burton L. Kingsley

National Secretary of the Nonpartisan League
- In office 1916–1923

State Secretary of the Socialist Party of North Dakota
- In office 1913–1916

Personal details
- Born: August 7, 1881 Forest City, Iowa, U.S.
- Died: March 12, 1941 (aged 59) Minneapolis, Minnesota, U.S.
- Party: Socialist (1913–1916); Nonpartisan League (1916–1923); Farmer-Labor (after 1923)
- Education: Valparaiso University
- Occupation: Teacher, editor

Henry George Teigan (August 7, 1881 – March 12, 1941) was an American teacher and editor who served as a member of the United States House of Representatives from Minnesota.

== Background ==
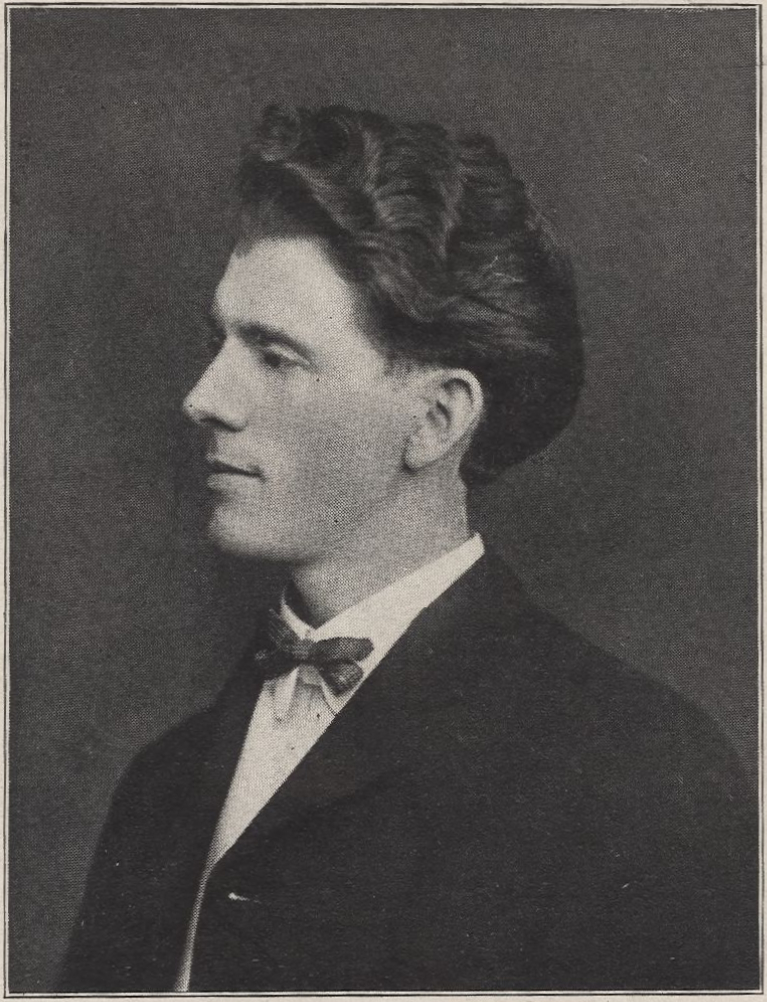
Teigan's Valparaiso University yearbook photo, 1909

Henry Teigan was born in Forest City, Winnebago County, Iowa. He attended Luther Academy in Albert Lea, Minnesota and Central College in Pella, Iowa, later graduating from Valparaiso University in 1908. He gave his commencement speech, published in the university's 1909 yearbook, on the merits of socialism. From 1900 to 1913 he was a teacher in various communities. (Iowa rural schools: 1900 – 1904, Des Lacs, North Dakota: 1909 – 1910, and Logan, North Dakota: 1912 – 1913).

== Career ==
He became involved in politics when he was elected state secretary of the Socialist Party of North Dakota in 1913, serving until 1916. In this position, he hired flax farmer Arthur C. Townley as a party organizer, whose efforts in the rural western part of the state laid the foundation of the Nonpartisan League. Teigan became secretary of the National Nonpartisan League in 1916 and moved to Minneapolis in 1917, serving in that position until 1923. From 1923 to 1925, he was secretary to Senator Magnus Johnson. At that time, he also began working as an editor and newspaper writer. In 1930 he was the Minnesota Farmer Labor Party nominee for state auditor, coming in second with 35.96% of the vote. He continued in newspaper work until 1932, when he was elected to the Minnesota Senate where he served one term.

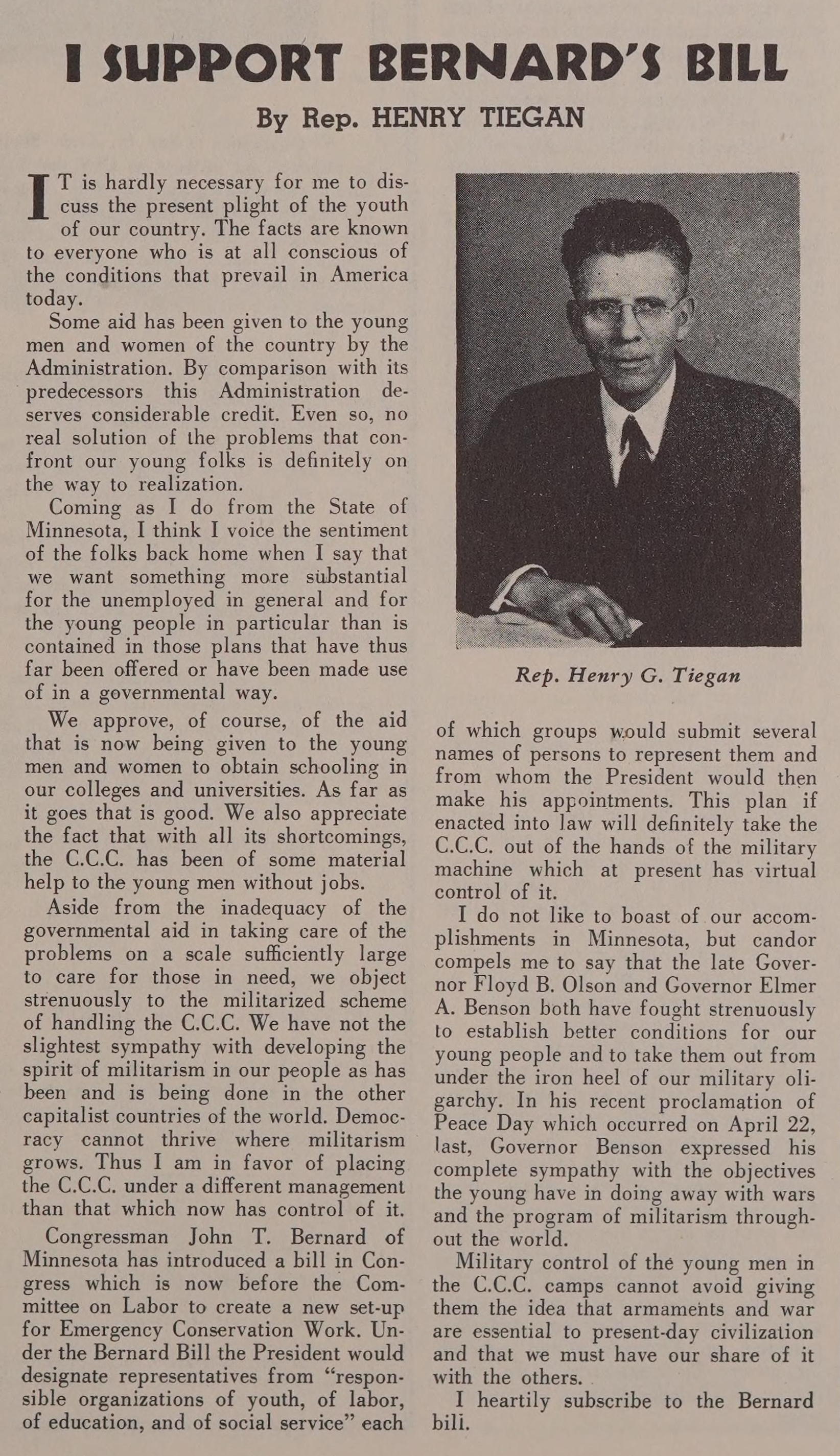
"I Support Bernard's Bill," an article by Teigan for the Champion of Youth, published Summer 1937

In 1936, he was elected as a candidate of the Minnesota Farmer Labor Party to the 75th congress. After one term, he failed to win reelection, and was also defeated in a 1940 bid to regain his seat. After leaving congress, he resumed newspaper and editorial work in Minneapolis, until his death on March 12, 1941. He is interred in Hillside Cemetery in Minneapolis. The papers of Henry George Teigan are maintained by the Minnesota Historical Society in St. Paul, Minnesota.

Party political offices
Preceded by S. O. Tjosvold	Farmer–Labor nominee for Minnesota State Auditor; 1930	Succeeded by John T. Lyons
U.S. House of Representatives
Preceded by Ernest Lundeen	Member of the U.S. House of Representatives from Minnesota's 3rd congressional district 1937–1939	Succeeded by John G. Alexander
