= Ibank =

ibank, iBank, or Ibank may refer to:

- iBank (software), a personal financial software package for Macintosh computers, made by IGG Software
- International Exchange Bank
- Investment banking, a form of banking practice
- Islamic Bank of Thailand
- California Infrastructure and Economic Development Bank

== See also ==
- Ibanking (disambiguation)
