= John G. Alexander =

American politician (1893–1971)

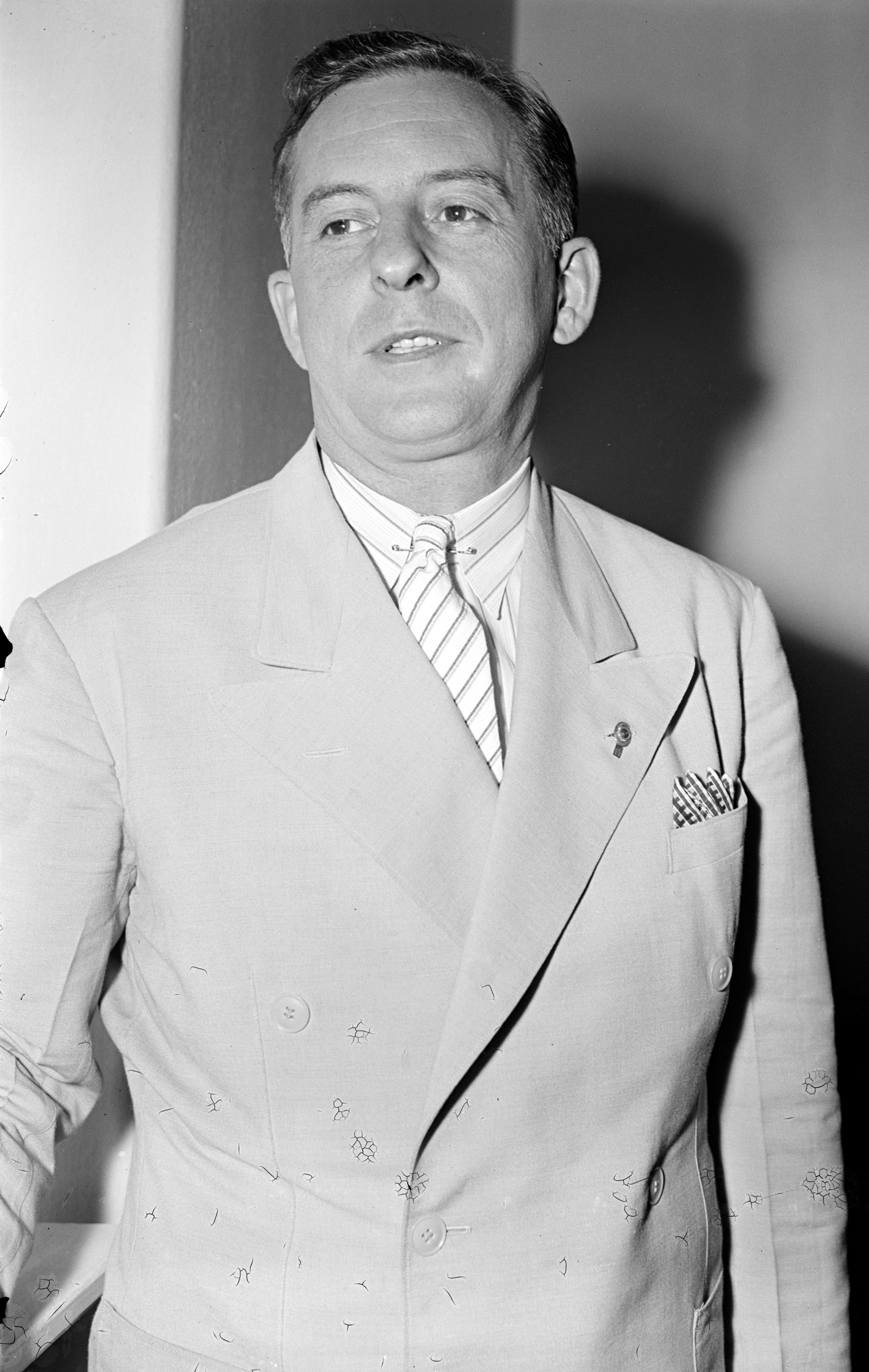
- Alexander in 1940

Member of the U.S. House of Representatives from Minnesota's 3rd district
- In office January 3, 1939 – January 3, 1941
- Preceded by: Henry Teigan
- Succeeded by: Richard Pillsbury Gale

Personal details
- Born: John Grant Alexander; July 16, 1893 Cortland County, New York, U.S.
- Died: December 8, 1971 (aged 78) Minneapolis, Minnesota, U.S.
- Resting place: Lakewood Cemetery
- Party: Republican
- Education: Cornell University
- Occupation: lawyer

John Grant Alexander (July 16, 1893 – December 8, 1971) was a Representative to the U.S. Congress from Minnesota.

== Biography ==
He was born in Texas Valley, Cortland County, New York; attended the public schools; was graduated from the law department of Cornell University, Ithaca, New York in 1916. He was admitted to the New York bar the same year; moved to Redwood Falls, in 1916.

== Career ==
He was admitted to the Minnesota bar in 1917 and commenced practice in Lynd; engaged in the banking business 1917 – 1923; during World War I served as a private in the Three Hundred and Eighty-sixth Ambulance Company in 1918; engaged in the insurance business and in real estate management in Minneapolis, in 1924; member of the Minnesota National Guard 1927 – 1937; elected as a Republican to the 76th congress, (January 3, 1939 – January 3, 1941); unsuccessful candidate for renomination in 1940; unsuccessful candidate for governor in 1942; resumed the business of real estate management and insurance; resided in Minneapolis, where he died December 8, 1971; interment in Lakewood Cemetery.

U.S. House of Representatives
Preceded by Henry Teigan	Member of the U.S. House of Representatives from Minnesota's 3rd congressional district 1939–1941	Succeeded by Richard Pillsbury Gale
