= James R. Waters =

American public servant

- James R. Waters, Manager of the Bank of North Dakota, circa 1919

North Dakota State Examiner
- In office 1917–1919
- Preceded by: G. J. Johnson
- Succeeded by: O. E. Lofthus

Manager of the Bank of North Dakota
- In office 1919–1920
- Succeeded by: F. W. Cathro

Personal details
- Born: December 18, 1867 Trumbull County, Ohio
- Died: September 3, 1929 (aged 61) Cass Lake, Minnesota
- Party: Nonpartisan League
- Spouse: Mary J. Brignon

James Ross Waters (December 18, 1867 – September 3, 1929) was an American rancher, real estate broker, banker, businessman, and government official from North Dakota. He served as North Dakota State Examiner from 1917 to 1919 and as the first Manager (or President) of the Bank of North Dakota from 1919 to 1920.

== Early years ==
Waters was born on December 18, 1867, in Trumbull County, Ohio. Around 1872, Waters moved with his parents, George A. Waters and Margaret E. (Davidson) Waters, to Poweshiek County, Iowa. After finishing high school in Montezuma, Waters received a degree from the Iowa Agricultural College and Model Farm.

After college, Waters worked in the railroad industry for several years and eventually moved to Minnesota. While in Minnesota, he switched to the real estate industry. In the early 1900s, this business brought him to North Dakota. He worked in Grand Forks, Minot, and then Beach.

== Career ==
=== Beach ===
Waters moved to Beach in 1909, and his business interests thrived. At the time, Beach was a prosperous city. Waters set up a real estate and loan business in Beach. Later in 1909, he helped establish the Bank of Yates in Yates, Montana, and served as its vice president. He was also associated with the Golden Valley Abstract Company and the Billings County Abstract Company, and he farmed and ranched on hundreds of acres of land.

Waters was active in the affairs of Beach. In 1910, he served as the secretary of the Beach Commercial Club, and about a year later in March 1911, he became its new president.

While in Beach, Waters became close friends with A. C. Townley, a local flax farmer. Townley, after his farm failed, would go on to found the Nonpartisan League (NPL) in 1915. Other future members of the NPL in Beach at this time included J. W. Brinton and John M. Baer.

In 1913, Waters received his first government appointment when Governor L. B. Hanna named him a Deputy Oil Inspector for Beach.

=== State Examiner ===
After the general election in November 1916, the NPL began taking control over state government in North Dakota. Governor-Elect Lynn J. Frazier was a Leaguer, and the NPL had a majority in the House. Leaguers were appointed to key government roles, such as Waters. Waters was a member of the NPL. In December 1916, Governor-Elect Frazier appointed Waters to be the next State Examiner, or state bank examiner. Waters accepted the nomination, and he was confirmed by the North Dakota Senate in early 1917.

As State Examiner, Waters became entangled in the controversial banking practices of the NPL. In order to manage its finances, increase its influence, and sustain the organization, the NPL expanded beyond politics into business. Several NPL-supported subsidiaries were started.

The NPL also moved into the baking industry and began taking a controlling interest in banks across North Dakota. Frequently, the bank reorganization work was done by prominent NPL members John J. Hastings and Thomas A. Box. However, the method in which some banks were purchased was devious. The NPL would essentially borrow money from the bank, and then use those funds to buy the bank. The NPL secured a controlling interest in the bank without putting any money in.

One NPL bank takeover particularly caught the attention of William Langer (Attorney General and member of the State Banking Board) in 1919. The American National Bank in Valley City, North Dakota, was reorganized into the American Exchange Bank. Waters' office reviewed the deal and was satisfied, and endorsed the deal to proceed. However, State Banking Board was suspicious of the deal and decided to investigate it further. The investigation determined that Box and Hastings had charged a hefty commission for services in reorganizing the bank, which was legal, but they had also purchased the bank for less than what had been represented to the stockholders. The State Banking Board made them repay the difference.

Waters continued to support the bank deal and said nothing was amiss. Langer disagreed, and he later wrote that Waters lied and was being deliberately deceptive about the bank. Despite the controversy surrounding the bank in Valley City, Waters was reappointed State Examiner by Gov. Frazier.

=== United States Sisal Trust ===
In 1918, prominent members of the NPL, including John J. Hastings and Thomas A. Box, established the United States Sisal Trust to cultivate sisal in Florida. It was believed that Florida had ideal soil and climate to compete with the Mexican sisal industry.

Sisal was an ideal fiber for binding twine, and twine was in high demand by North Dakota farmers in the 1910s. Sisal largely came from Mexico, which had turbulent political and economic conditions. This impacted the supply and price of sisal.

According to Waters, he and J. W. Brinton took over the sisal operation in March 1919. Waters claimed Townley begged him to take over the company, saying, "For God's sake, Jim, take this deal off my hands." Waters became the company's president. Brinton and Waters would later claim that Hastings and Box were removed from the sisal project at the direct orders of Townley, following the negative publicity the two earned for the NPL after they controversially reorganized a bank in Valley City.

The extent of Townley's involvement in the company is unclear. Brinton, Waters, and Hastings swore Townley was financially invested in the project, but was indirectly involved in its management. Waters also claimed Townley did not want it known that he was involved with the sisal operation in Florida, which had purchased over 22,000 acres of land in Dade County, near Miami, because he, Townley, was supposed to be bankrupt at the time. To protect Townley and take suspicion away from him, Waters said the plan was to insert large advertisements for the U.S. Sisal Trust into anti-NPL newspapers, which was done in September 1919.

The sisal operation was a tempting investment, but the project faced numerous problems from the start: Waters and Brinton had no experience in sisal cultivation, there was a lack of roads, the land was not close to a railroad, drainage, labor shortages, low funds, and the dropping price of sisal. The operation quickly started to lose money.

By the summer of 1921, the U.S. Sisal Trust was bankrupt. Waters sued Townley, claiming he was owed money for running the company on his behalf. This case was settled out of court in 1922.

== Bank of North Dakota ==
=== Bank opens ===
With control of the state legislature and the governor's office, the NPL made good on its promise to establish a state-owned bank, and legislation creating the Bank of North Dakota was passed and signed into law in February 1919.

The Industrial Commission, which was another recent creation of the NPL-controlled state legislature, appointed Waters to be Manager of the Bank of North Dakota on April 4, 1919. It was rumored that either Halvor J. Hagen, President of the Scandinavian American Bank in Fargo, or Neil C. Macdonald, former Superintendent of Public Instruction, would succeed Waters as State Examiner. Ultimately, the job went to O. E. Lofthus, a banker in Kloten, North Dakota.

Waters claimed to have twenty years of banking experience, but this claim was disputed. Langer (Attorney General) particularly disagreed with Waters' supposed experience, and, as a member of the Industrial Commission, he objected to his appointment. Langer would later write that Waters had never before managed a bank. Langer seemingly did not like Waters. Back in March 1918, he had attempted to block his re-endorsement as State Examiner at the NPL convention in Fargo.

Perhaps to quell the concerns over the experience of Waters or to add needed stability, F. W. Cathro was named Director General on April 9, 1919. Cathro was a respected and experienced banker from Bottineau, North Dakota.

The duties of the Manager included serving as the general agent of the Industrial Commission, hiring and firing staff, and approving surety bonds of banks wanting to become depository banks. The Director General was subordinate to the Manager, but directly supervised the bank's departments and oversaw the day-to-day operations of the bank.

The Bank of North Dakota officially opened for business on July 28, 1919, in downtown Bismarck.

Cathro, although subordinate to Waters, received a higher salary. Cathro was paid $10,000 annually, and Waters received $5,000. This was a major point of contention between the two men, and it was frequently reported that Waters and Cathro did not get along. The two often criticized each other's decisions.

With Waters increasingly gone from the bank, overseeing the United States Sisal Trust in Florida, more responsibility fell to Cathro. Waters' absence did not go unnoticed by his opponents, particularly Langer and Thomas Hall (Secretary of State). In late August 1919, the two men, making up a majority of the State Banking Board, banded together and passed a resolution calling on Waters to either resign as Manager of the Bank of North Dakota or step down as President of the United States Sisal Trust, stating he could not faithfully serve the people of North Dakota while serving in both roles. However, the State Banking Board had no authority over Waters, so the resolution went unanswered.

=== Scandinavian American Bank ===
In the fall of 1919, the Bank of North Dakota became entangled in the scandal surrounding the Scandinavian American Bank in Fargo. The Scandinavian American Bank was controlled by the NPL. Suspicious of the NPL's banking practices, the State Banking Board, meaning Langer and Hall, ordered an examination of the bank in what would become known as the "Langer Raid."

The Deputy Examiner, P. E. Halldorson, and Assistant Attorney General, Albert E. Sheets, concluded that the Scandinavian American Bank was not financially stable and had excessive loans. Stating the bank had violated state banking laws, the State Banking Board, over the objection of Gov. Frazier, voted to temporarily close the bank.

Several of the excessive loans had been given to NPL members and NPL subsidiaries, one of which was to the United States Sisal Trust.

Waters blamed the loans on his predecessors Hastings and Box. The State Banking Board temporarily revoked the permit of the United States Sisal Trust to sell stock in the state. Langer and Hall went further and adopted a resolution censuring Waters and accusing him of warning the Scandinavian American Bank of impending examinations from the state when he was State Examiner.

Proof of this accusation was found in a letter that was released to the public by Langer in October 1919, following the Scandinavian American Bank investigation.

The infamous "shoot it to the other banks" letter was sent to Hastings, Vice President of the Scandinavian American Bank, from Roy M. Halliday, Waters' chief assistant, on June 10, 1918. In the letter, Halliday seemingly gives Hastings advice from Waters on how to outwit bank examiners and how to help avoid giving the NPL's opposition any leverage over the bank. Halliday tells Hastings that if a bank examiner finds any issues during an audit, he (Hastings) should tell the examiner that the issue would be taken care of immediately to get a clean report, but instead the "bad paper" should be moved to other NPL banks and then transferred back later.

In a follow-up letter the next day, Halliday tells Hastings not to send anything to the NPL banks in Grand Forks or Buxton, but the NPL banks in Hatton, Hillsboro, and Lisbon were good options.

Later in December 1919, during the special session of the state legislature, at least one legislator petitioned for the immediate resignation of Waters and Halliday because of the "shoot it to the other banks" letter and their involvement with the Scandinavian American Bank. However, the NPL majority in the legislature voted this resolution down.

After the Langer Raid, documents were reportedly found linking the Scandinavian American Bank to the Bank of North Dakota. On October 6, 1919, citing these documents, Langer, as Attorney General, ordered Carl R. Kositzky (State Auditor) to immediately audit the Bank of North Dakota "for the protection of taxpayers of the state." Within hours, Kositzky, a Langer ally and NPL defector, arrived at the bank with a contingent of auditors, examiners, and accountants. Waters and Cathro were both absent, and the audit began without issue. However, when Waters arrived later and discovered Kositzky in charge of the bank's records, a verbal altercation reportedly ensued.

Kositzky and his team spent a few hours at the bank and then left for the day, stating they would return the following day to finish the audit. The next day, when members of the auditing team returned, they were denied entry. Cathro refused to allow the audit to continue. Cathro stated that he had halted the examination for the protection of the bank's clients and because the State Auditor did not have the legal authority to examine it.

The issue over the legal authority to audit the Bank of North Dakota went to court. The case began in district court, and the judge, William Nuessle, ruled in favor of the Bank of North Dakota. The case was then appealed to the North Dakota Supreme Court. On February 18, 1920, the N.D. Supreme Court also sided with the Bank of North Dakota. The ruling stated the bank was semi-private, so the State Auditor did not have the authority to audit it because that office was limited to public departments. Although the Bank of North Dakota was ultimately in the right when it challenged the audit, opponents used the situation to their advantage and claimed the bank must be hiding something, and the bank lost some support.

=== Resignation ===
In April 1920, the NPL's Courier-News published an article reporting the resignation of Waters as Manager of the Bank of North Dakota, and a copy of the resignation letter was included in the article. The Industrial Commission accepted the resignation and appointed Cathro to succeed Waters as Manager, while also continuing to serve as Director General. Waters was in Florida at the time, managing the struggling sisal operation.

Waters remained silent about his resignation for about four months. Then, in August 1920, he spoke out publicly and claimed he had been forced out as Manager. He further claimed that his resignation letter was a forgery, and its true author must have been William Lemke, a leader of the NPL and editor of the Courier-News, another member of the NPL, or an employee of the Bank of North Dakota.

== Later years ==
=== Essays and book ===
By the fall of 1920, Waters and Brinton had cut ties with Townley and the NPL. The two wrote a series of anti-NPL essays that were published in North Dakota newspapers, particularly the Grand Forks Herald. The essays were also put into a book and published by Brinton.

=== 1921 legislative session ===
In early 1921, the North Dakota Legislative Assembly convened for its regular session. After the general election in November 1920, the NPL maintained its majority in the Senate, but its opposition, the Independent Voters Association (IVA), gained control of the House. The legislature accomplished little as it awaited a report from the Bishop-Brissman firm, which had been hired to audit the state-run industries established by the NPL. Once the report was received, the IVA launched an investigation through the House Audit Committee, and the NPL followed suit with investigations through the Senate Audit Committee.

Waters and Brinton, having turned against the NPL, became star witnesses for the IVA. They testified about several NPL subsidiaries, since they had both been involved in many of them, such as the Scandinavian American Bank, the Bank of North Dakota, and the U.S. Sisal Trust.

For all of his accusations and statements, Brinton was charged with perjury. He had made several accusations against prominent members of the NPL, but he particularly insisted that Townley was directly involved with the U.S. Sisal Trust and that Lemke and Townley had embezzled NPL funds. The perjury case went to trial, and Brinton was acquitted in July 1921.

=== Minnesota ===
After cutting ties with the NPL and North Dakota, Waters moved to Minnesota. He worked in the insurance business in Minneapolis and then moved to Cass Lake, where he worked as a registrar of the federal land office.

=== Death ===
Waters died of kidney failure at his home in Cass Lake in September 1929. He was buried in Montezuma, Iowa.

== Personal life ==
Waters married Mary J. Brignon in Iowa on October 27, 1894. The couple had two children: George and Angeline. George died of heart disease in 1911 at age 15.

Waters was known for his love of horses and horse racing, and he trained his own prize-winning stallion, Major Ong. In August 1917, at a race in Iowa, Major Ong was seriously injured, but the horse recovered and continued to win races. In December 1918, Waters sold Major Ong to Danielson Bros. of Glyndon, Minnesota. Danielson Bros. was a prosperous farm that was connected to the NPL's Scandinavian American Bank in Fargo for receiving controversial and excessive loans.

Waters was a member of the Freemasons.

Waters was a sickly man and was frequently in and out of hospitals, especially in the 1910s and 1920s. In September 1913, he had an operation in a Dickinson hospital to remove a large abscess from his lower intestines. In 1914, he had an operation at the Mayo Clinic in Rochester and remained there for two months afterward recovering. In June 1918, he had an unidentified operation at a hospital in Bismarck. In early September 1918, he suffered from an attack of neuritis. Waters was a star witness for the IVA during the 1921 session of the state legislature. However, his testimony was delayed because of his hospitalization in Bismarck with an unidentified illness. After being released from the hospital, he testified before the House Audit Committee in late February 1921. Waters must have still been recovering because after testifying for two hours, he fainted on the stand and was carried out. Kidney trouble was the cause of Waters' death in 1929.

== See also ==
- Bank of North Dakota
