= Ibanking =

Ibanking may refer to:

- Investment banking
- Islamic banking

== See also ==
- ibank (disambiguation)
