= California Infrastructure and Economic Development Bank =

State owned bank

- Type: Public bank
- Industry: Banking financial services
- Founded: 1994; 32 years ago in Sacramento, California
- Headquarters: Sacramento, California, United States
- Area served: California
- Key people: Scott Wu (executive director
- Operating income: (2021)
- Net income: ▲US$519.14 million
- Owner: Government of California

The California Infrastructure and Economic Development Bank (IBank) is a state-owned, state-run financial institution based in Sacramento, California. The bank operates under the Bergeson-Peace Infrastructure and Economic Development Bank Act of 1994 and is governed by a five-member board of directors. Part of the banks purpose is to aid the development and financing of infrastructure projects, ranging from roads to the improvement of port facilities, by issuing bonds and providing financing to public agencies. Extending from this the bank created the California Lending for Energy and Environmental Needs Center (CLEEN) to help address greenhouse gas emissions within the state.

== See also ==
- Bank of North Dakota, another state-run financial institution
