= Banco Unión =

Bolivian bank

Banco Unión S.A.
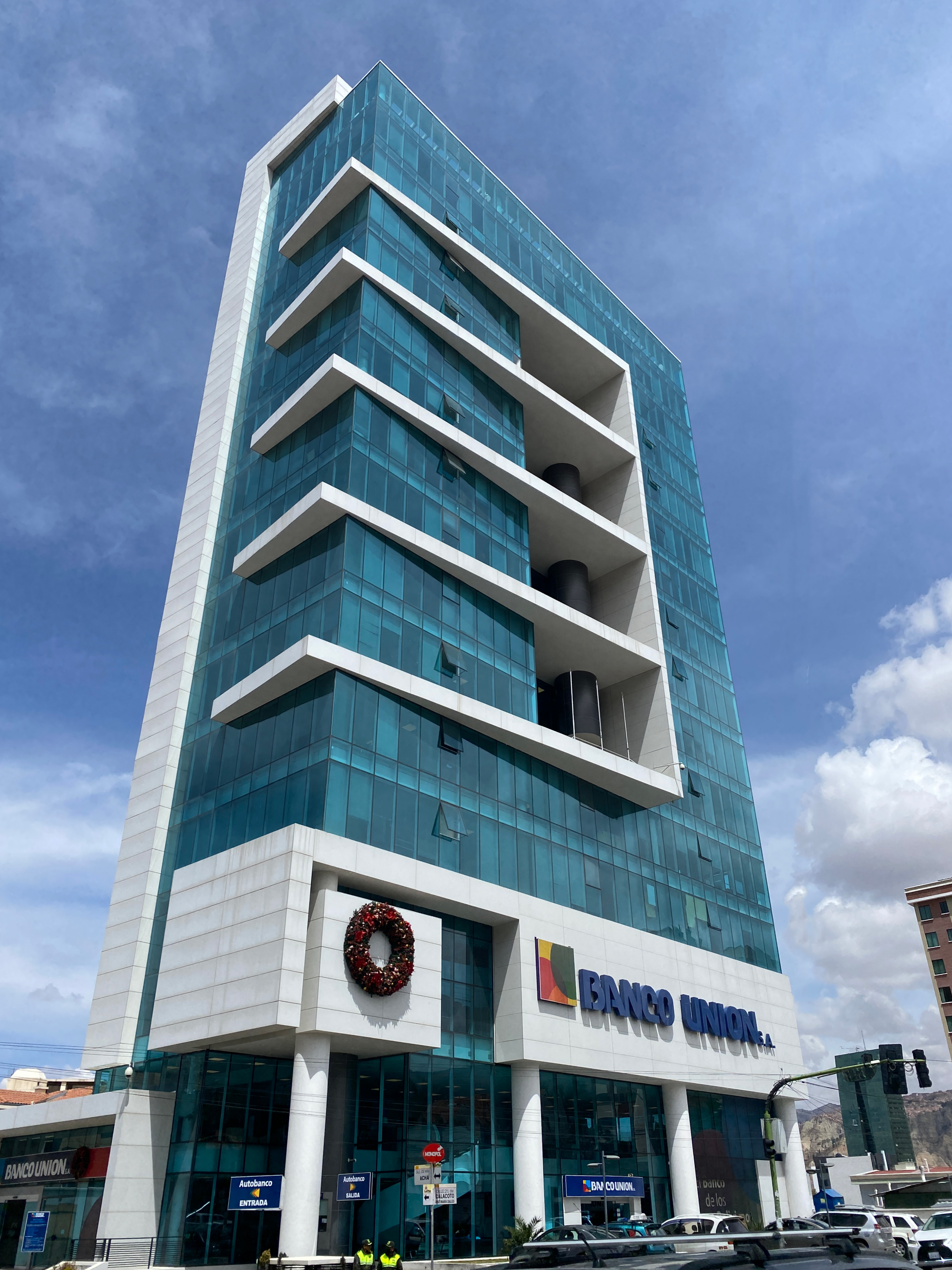
- Headquarters in La Paz
- Company type: Sociedad Anónima.
- Traded as: BBV: BUN
- Industry: Banking, Financial services
- Founded: November 5, 1981; 44 years ago
- Headquarters: La Paz, Bolivia
- Key people: Ronald Omar Pinto Ribera(Chairman), Ariel Rodrigo Barja Chamas(Vice President)
- Products: Consumer banking, corporate banking, credit cards, insurance, investment banking, mortgage loans, risk management.
- Total assets: ▲ Bs. 52.52 billion (2023)
- Number of employees: 4,489 (2023)
- Divisions: Seguros y Reaseguros Personales UNIVIDA S.A. Sociedad Administradora de Fondos de Inversión UNIÓN S.A. Unibienes Seguros y Reaseguros Patrimoniales S.A. Valores Unión S.A.
- Website: https://www.bancounion.com.bo

Banco Unión S.A. It is a Bolivian state bank based in La Paz. It was founded on November 5, 1981 and is one of the country's main institutions.

As a public financial intermediary, Banco Unión carries out financial operations for the public administration at different levels of government, as well as offering financial services to the general public. Banco Unión also manages the majority of deposits held by public and government entities. Along with the Central Bank of Bolivia, Banco Unión is one of the two financial instruments of the Bolivian state.

By 2022, Banco Unión had 255 branches and 475 ATMs in Bolivia's nine departments.

== History ==
On July 28, 1979, the Bolivian government established a new public financial entity called Banco de la Unión S.A. through public deed No. 93, which began operations on November 5, 1981. A year later, the bank opened its first office in La Paz and later in Santa Cruz de la Sierra. Through the National Treasury, the government established a 97% stake in the new bank, whose primary objective was to provide financial services to Bolivian public administration entities.

On October 17, 1996, the Financial System Supervisory Authority (ASFI) approved the change of the company name to Banco Unión S.A. Between 2004 and 2006, Banco Unión underwent a reorganization period thanks to increased financial income and increased banking assets. In 2009, the bank changed its legal domicile from Santa Cruz de la Sierra to La Paz, the country's seat of government.

== Corporate affairs ==
=== Board of directors ===
- Ronald Omar Pinto Ribera (Chairman)
- Ariel Rodrigo Barja Chamas (First Vice President)
- Martin Adolfo Iturri Peters (Second Vice President)
- Danny Ronald Roca Jimenez (Director)
- Karen Alanoca Saavedra (Director)
- Jorge Joaquín Hurtado Cárdenas (Secretary)
- Ranulfo Prieto Salinas (Syndic)
