= Richard P. Gale =

American politician

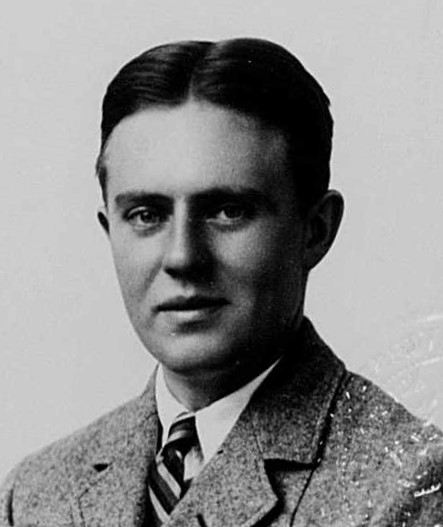
- Gale in 1922

Member of the U.S. House of Representatives from Minnesota's 3rd district
- In office January 3, 1941 – January 3, 1945
- Preceded by: John G. Alexander
- Succeeded by: William Gallagher

Member of the Minnesota House of Representatives from the 36th district
- In office January 3, 1939 – January 6, 1940
- Preceded by: Baldwin Hartkopf Sr. and Richard Tighe
- Succeeded by: Reuben Erickson and Lawrence Haeg Sr.

Personal details
- Born: Richard Pillsbury Gale; October 30, 1900 Minneapolis, Minnesota, U.S.
- Died: December 4, 1973 (aged 73) Minneapolis, Minnesota, U.S.
- Resting place: Lakewood Cemetery
- Party: Republican
- Spouse: Isobel Rising (m. 1923)
- Children: 2
- Relatives: John S. Pillsbury (grandfather)
- Education: Yale University
- Occupation: Farmer; politician

Richard Pillsbury Gale (October 30, 1900 – December 4, 1973) was an American politician and farmer who served as a U.S. representative from Minnesota. He was a member of the Republican Party.

Gale was a part of the Pilsbury family, a prominent Minnesota milling family that founded and owned the Pillsbury Company, one of the world's largest grain producers.

== Life ==
Gale was born in Minneapolis, Minnesota, the son of Edward Cheney and Sarah Bell (née Pillsbury) Gale. A member of the Pilsbury family, which founded and owned the Pillsbury Company, his grandfather was Minnesota governor John S. Pillsbury.

Gale attended Minneapolis public schools, The Blake School, Minnesota Farm School, and the University of Minnesota at Minneapolis. He graduated from Yale University in 1922 and became engaged in agricultural pursuits and securities in 1923.

Gale married Isobel Rising on August 8, 1923, in St. Paul, Minnesota. They had two children.

Gale returned to agricultural pursuits and resided at Wickham Farm near Mound. His son later donated the farm to the Three Rivers Park District. It remains open to the public. Gale died in Minneapolis on December 4, 1973, and was interred in Lakewood Cemetery.

== Political career ==
Gale was elected to the Minnesota House of Representatives in 1938 and served from 1939 to 1941. He was a member of the Mound School Board for eight years and a trustee of Blake School at Hopkins.

Gale was elected as a Republican to the 77th and 78th congresses (January 3, 1941 – January 3, 1945). He was an unsuccessful candidate for reelection in 1944.

Gale advocated biological warfare, or, in his words, "spore war", against German and Japanese food supplies during World War II, suggesting that planes spread grain rust, potato fungus, and rice fungus on crops. His collection of Japanese prints and scroll paintings from the Tokugawa period was considered one of the best privately owned collections in the U.S.

U.S. House of Representatives
Preceded by John G. Alexander	Member of the U.S. House of Representatives from Minnesota's 3rd congressional district 1941–1945	Succeeded by William Gallagher
