= 1906 Minnesota gubernatorial election =

- November 6, 1906
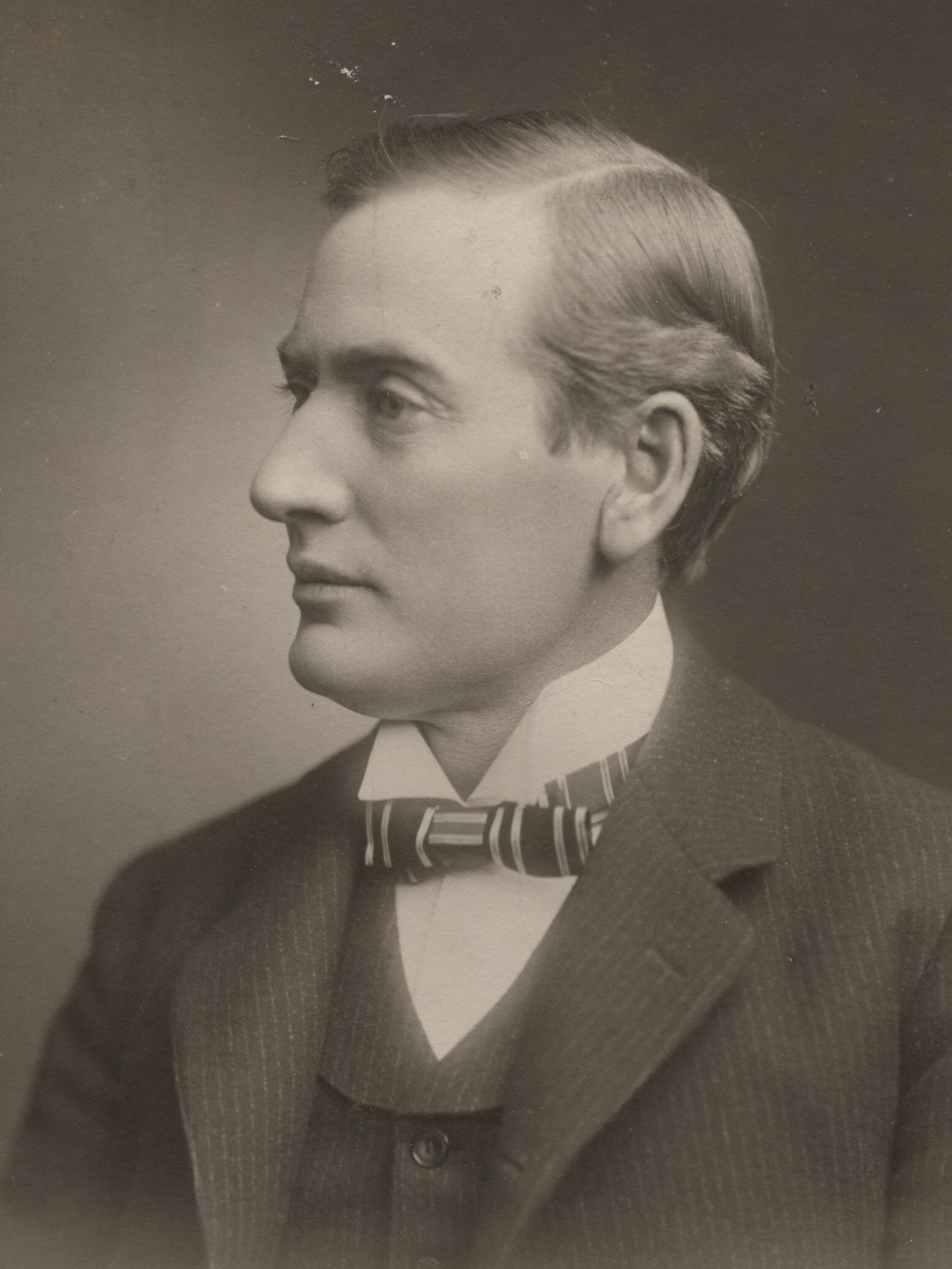

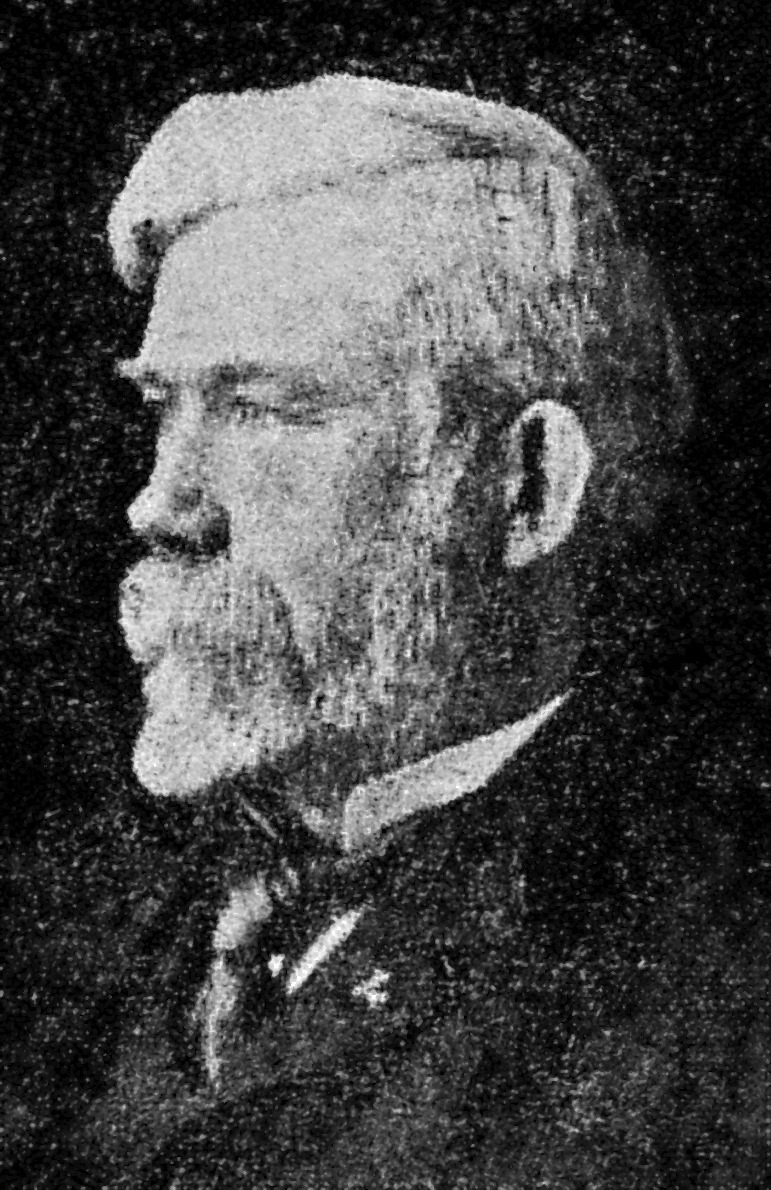
Nominee	John Albert Johnson	Albert L. Cole
Party	Democratic	Republican
Popular vote	168,480	96,162
Percentage	60.93%	34.78%
- County results Johnson: 40–50% 50–60% 60–70% 70–80% Cole: 40–50% 50–60%
Governor before election
John Albert Johnson
Democratic
Elected Governor
John Albert Johnson
Democratic

The 1906 Minnesota gubernatorial election took place on November 6, 1906. Democratic incumbent John Albert Johnson defeated Republican Party of Minnesota challenger Albert L. Cole.

== Candidates ==
- Albert L. Cole, member of the Minnesota House of Representatives (Republican)
- Charles W. Dorsett, attorney (Prohibition)
- John Albert Johnson, incumbent (Democrat)
- Ole E. Lofthus, teacher (Public Ownership)

== Campaigns ==
At the Republican State Convention, held in Duluth on June 13, 1906, Cole was unanimously nominated.

The Democratic State Convention was held on September 4, 1906. Johnson was renominated unanimously.

Johnson, a popular incumbent, increased his majority from the previous election in 1904 by over twelve points, nearly winning every county. This was, at the time, the best showing the Democratic Party of Minnesota for governor.

== Results ==
1906 gubernatorial election, Minnesota
Party	Candidate	Votes	%	±%
Democratic	John Albert Johnson (incumbent)	168,480	60.93%	+12.22%
Republican	Albert L. Cole	96,162	34.78%	−11.35%
Prohibition	Charles W. Dorsett	7,223	2.61%	+0.12%
Public Ownership	O. E. Lofthus	6,516	1.68%	−0.23%
Majority		72,318	26.15%	
Turnout		276,511		
Democratic hold		Swing		

== See also ==
- List of Minnesota gubernatorial elections
