= Socialist Party of North Dakota =

Semi-autonomous affiliate of the Socialist Party of America

North Dakota was the 39th state of the United States, gaining admission in November 1889.

The Socialist Party of North Dakota was the semi-autonomous affiliate of the Socialist Party of America established in 1902 in the state of North Dakota. The organization had roots in a socialist club founded by Norwegian immigrants in Fargo in 1900. One of the party's professional organizers, a former farmer named Arthur C. Townley, abandoned the group in 1915 to establish a new organization called the Non-Partisan League. The rapid growth of this organization spelled the demise of the official Socialist organization in the state.

== Organizational history ==
=== Forerunners ===
The first organized socialist group in North Dakota was a socialist club started by Arthur Basset in the town of Fargo, located just across the Minnesota border. A considerable number of Scandinavian immigrants had settled in the Upper Midwest, often bringing with them cooperative traditions from the old country. This was particularly true of the Norwegian community which congregated in the Red River Valley in the Eastern part of the state. This Fargo club would provide the initial core of the Socialist Party organization in the state of North Dakota.

=== Establishment ===
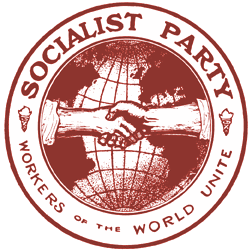
The Socialist Party of North Dakota was a semi-autonomous state affiliate of the Socialist Party of America, established in 1901.

The Socialist Party of America was established at a convention held in Indianapolis, Indiana in August 1901. The group made its initial national headquarters in Omaha, Nebraska and maintained a physical presence in the American Midwest. Two leaders of the Fargo socialist club — Basset and a young lawyer named Arthur LeSueur — decided to establish a North Dakota state organization of the new political party. This organization was formally launched in 1902.

After a slow initial phase, the Socialist Party of North Dakota began to show substantial growth as the second decade of the 20th century began. In 1911 LeSueur was elected president of the City Commission in the town of Minot, located in the North Central part of the state. This victory made LeSueur the most widely recognized face of the Socialist Party of North Dakota and helped to make the town the center of the party's activity. The North Dakota Socialist Party grew rapidly, touting 175 party locals and branches by 1912.

The Socialist Party of North Dakota maintained its own press, publishing a weekly newspaper called The Iconoclast in Minot from 1912. The organization also ran a full slate of candidates, garnering about 8 percent of the vote statewide in the election of 1912, the peak year of the party's existence.

=== The rise of Townley ===
A moderate, electorally-oriented faction controlled the Socialist Party of North Dakota throughout its existence. This group sought to appeal to the farmers of the state, putting together a program which would win their electoral support. Radical socialist ideas such as the collectivization of land were cast aside in favor of more modest economic reforms such as the establishment of state-owned grain elevators and flour mills and state-sponsored agricultural insurance to protect against natural catastrophes.

In 1913, Henry G. Teigan was elected State Secretary of the Socialist Party of North Dakota. Teigan sought to greatly expand the party's size and influence through a concentrated grassroots recruiting effort targeted in the rural western part of the state. Teigan hired a paid organizer for this task, Arthur C. Townley, a formerly prosperous flax farmer who had seen his substantial operation located on the Western border of the state near the town of Beach wiped out in 1912 by early winter weather and falling commodity prices. Townley set out on his organizing efforts late in 1913 but met with resistance among the farmers he approached, who supported the various economic ideas put forward by the Socialist Party but who refused to support that organization itself.

The following year Townley greatly expanded his efforts as a professional party organizer, establishing what the called the "Organization Department." Townley obtained an inexpensive Ford automobile from friends and took to the road to meet with farmers, charging them high dues of $1 a month to become a member of the "Organization Department" — omitting mention of the Socialist Party in his appeal. Townley's efforts proved wildly successful and he was soon able to raise enough money to purchase three more automobiles and to put his own organizers in the field.

While Townley expanded and prospered as a professional political organizer, the Socialist Party of North Dakota which ostensibly had employed him was less than enthusiastic. The state party was part of a national organization which charged dues of just 25 cents per month and was forced to function on a fraction of that amount and they objected to Townley's increasingly rogue political operation. The Socialist Party of North Dakota disavowed Townley's efforts and on December 15, 1914 when he and his trio of organizing associated refused to terminate their activities after being ordered to stop, Townley was expelled from the Socialist Party.

== Notable members ==
- Hans Amlie, commander of the Lincoln Battalion during the Spanish Civil War
- David C. Coates, Lieutenant Governor of Colorado (1901–1903)
- Arthur LeSueur, President of the Minot City Commission (1909–1911)
- O. E. Lofthus, North Dakota State Examiner (1919–1921)
- Signe Lund, composer and music teacher
- A. C. Miller, North Dakota State Representative (1925–1927)
- Henry Teigan, U.S. Representative (1937–1939)
- Arthur C. Townley, founder of the Nonpartisan League (1915)

== See also ==
- Non-Partisan League
- Socialist Party of Missouri
- Socialist Party of Oklahoma
- Socialist Party of Oregon
- Socialist Party of Washington
- Social-Democratic Party of Wisconsin

== SPND average paid memberships ==
Year	Average Paid Membership	Exempt Members	National SPA Membership
1901		n/a	4,759 paid (of 7,629)
1902	44	n/a	9,949
1903		n/a	15,975
1904		n/a	20,763
1905		n/a	23,327
1906		n/a	26,784
1907		n/a	29,270
1908		n/a	41,751
1909	177	n/a	41,470
1910		n/a	58,011
1911		n/a	84,716
1912		n/a	118,045
1913			95,957
1914			93,579
1915			79,374
1916	843		83,284
1917	225		80,379
1918	182 (first 6 mos.)		82,344
1919			104,822
1920			26,766
1921			13,484
1922			11,019
1923			10,662
1924			10,125
1925			8,558
1926			8,392
1927			7,425
1928			7,793
1929			9,560
1930			9,736
1931			10,389
1932			16,863
1933			18,548
1934			20,951
1935			19,121
1936			11,922

Sources: Carl D. Thompson, "The Rising Tide of Socialism," The Socialist (Columbus, OH), Aug. 12, 1911, pg. 2; St. Louis Labor, Feb. 22, 1902, pg. 5; "Dues Paid Last Year," The Worker, March 22, 1903, pg. 4; Socialist Party Official Bulletin and successors, Executive Secretary state-by-state membership summaries, January issues;"Socialist Party Official Membership Series,' (1932). Report to 1937 Convention, cited in "Socialist Party of America Annual Membership Figures," Early American Marxism website. Adoloph Germer, Report of Executive Secretary to the National Executive Committee: Chicago, Illinois — Aug. 8, 1918, pp. 5-6. "Exempt" members denote those receiving special dispensation from the state office due to unemployment starting 1913. 1909 figure from Socialist Party Official Bulletin, April 1910, pg. 4.
