= Territorial Bank of American Samoa =

Territory-owned and -run financial institution

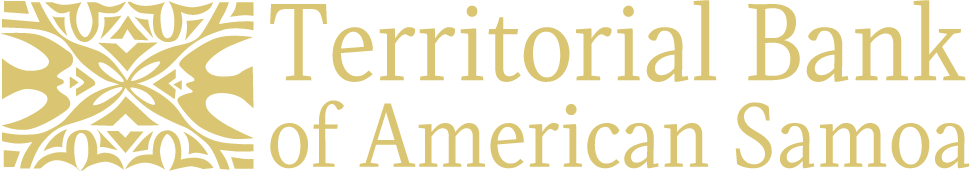
- Type: Public bank
- Industry: Banking; Financial services
- Founded: 2016; 10 years ago in Pago Pago, American Samoa
- Headquarters: Pago Pago, American Samoa, United States
- Area served: American Samoa
- Key people: Owen Peery (President and CEO)
- Total assets: US$28.8 million (2018)
- Owner: Government of American Samoa
- Website: mytbas.com

The Territorial Bank of American Samoa (TBAS) is a state-owned, state-run financial institution based in Pago Pago, American Samoa. It is one of only two government-owned general-service banks in the United States.

The bank was established in response to an announcement in 2012 from the Bank of Hawaii that it planned to leave the territory. The bank is unique in that it does not have FDIC insurance and its deposits are instead backed by the government of American Samoa.
