= William Gallagher (politician) =

American politician

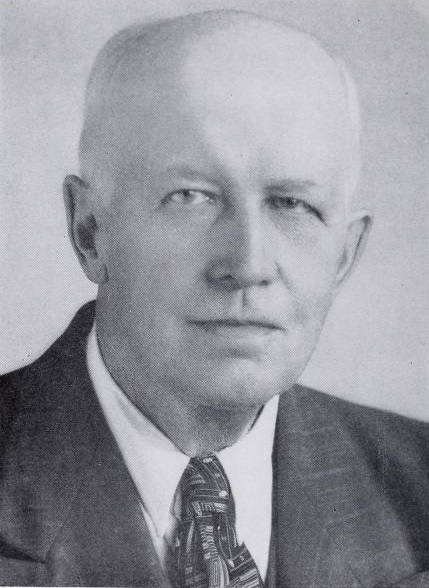
- Frontispiece of 1949's William J. Gallagher, Late a Representative

Member of the U.S. House of Representatives from Minnesota's 3rd district
- In office January 3, 1945 – August 13, 1946
- Preceded by: Richard Pillsbury Gale
- Succeeded by: George MacKinnon

Personal details
- Born: William James Gallagher; May 13, 1875 Minneapolis, Minnesota, U.S.
- Died: August 13, 1946 (aged 71) Rochester, Minnesota, U.S.
- Party: Democratic
- Occupation: editor, proofreader, street sweeper

William James Gallagher (May 13, 1875 – August 13, 1946) was a representative to the U.S. Congress from Minnesota; born in Minneapolis, Hennepin County, Minnesota; attended the public schools, and was graduated from North High School in 1894; engaged as an editorial employee and proofreader in Minneapolis, MN, in 1895 and 1896; moved to Spokane, Washington, in 1897 and continued his former pursuits with a labor journal until 1899; returned to Minneapolis, and engaged as a trucker and clerk in freight houses until 1919; employed as a street sweeper for Hennepin County 1919–1927 and for the city of Minneapolis, from 1927 until his retirement in 1942; was elected as a Democrat to the 79th congress, and served from January 3, 1945, until his death; had been renominated to the 80th congress in 1946; died in a hospital at Rochester, Minnesota, August 13, 1946; interment in Crystal Lake Cemetery, Minneapolis, Minnesota.

== See also ==
- List of members of the United States Congress who died in office (1900–1949)

U.S. House of Representatives
Preceded by Richard Pillsbury Gale	U.S. Representative from Minnesota's 3rd congressional district 1945 – 1946	Succeeded by George MacKinnon
