= Texas Valley =

Coordinates: 34°23′55.65″N 85°12′30.73″W

Texas Valley is the name of two valleys in Floyd County, in the U.S. state of Georgia.

The twin valleys are more precisely called Big Texas Valley and Little Texas Valley. There are two stories on the origin of the name Texas Valley; both involve pioneers who were passing through on their way to Texas.
