= Public bank =

State-owned or noncommercial financial institution

A public bank is a bank, a financial institution, in which a state, municipality, or public actors are the owners. It is an enterprise under government control. Prominent among current public banking models are the Bank of North Dakota, the Sparkassen-Finanzgruppe in Germany, and many nations' postal bank systems.

Public or 'state-owned' banks proliferated globally in the late 19th and early 20th centuries as vital agents of industrialisation in capitalist and socialist countries alike; as late as 2012, state banks still owned and controlled up to 25 per cent of total global banking assets.

Proponents of public banking argue that policymakers can create public-sector banks to reduce the costs of government services and infrastructure; protect and aid local banks; offer banking services to people and entities underserved by private-sector banking; and promote particular kinds of economic development reflecting polities' shared notions of social good. The 2015 Addis Ababa Financing for Development Action Agenda noted that public banks should have an important role in achieving the new Sustainable Development Goals. Increasingly, major international financial institutions are recognising the positive and catalytic role public banks can serve in the coming low carbon climate resilient transition. Further, international NGOs and critical scholars argue that public banks can play a significant role in financing a just and equitable energy transition.

== Definitions of public banking ==
According to the Public Banking Institute, "[a] Public Bank is a chartered depository bank in which public funds are deposited. A Public Bank is owned by a government unit—a state, county, city, or tribe—and mandated to serve a public mission that reflects the values and needs of the public that it represents." According to Ellen Brown, public ownership of a bank is distinct from state-socialism in that the latter is government ownership of the means of production, whereas public banking involves government oversight of the credit and debit system that facilitates economic exchange, including that of free markets.

=== Public banks compared to credit unions ===
Public banks are owned and operated by governments, while credit unions are private entities collectively owned by their members. In the United States, federal law forbids credit unions from making commercial loans that exceed 12.25% of their total assets. This effectively prevents credit unions from operating as mainly credit-issuing institutions.

== How public banks work ==
Public banks come in a variety of models. A public bank might be capitalized through an initial investment by the city or state, as well as through tax and fee revenue. A public bank, like a private bank, can take tax revenues and other government income as deposits, create money in the form of bank credit, and lend at very low interest rates. Where private banks are committed by their business model to take advantage of low interest rates by charging higher rates to borrowers, a public bank has no shareholders to pay, and so can pass the low rates onto borrowers such as public agencies, local businesses, residents, and students. At the same time because much of a public bank's funding comes from state deposits that would otherwise earn more from a private bank, there is a hidden subsidy that acts as a transfer from taxpayers to borrowers.

Public banks can also partner with (underwriting or guaranteeing the loans of) local banks to fund projects that might otherwise go unfunded. Such partnering with local banks leads practitioners of public banking to say, like Bank of North Dakota President Eric Hardmeyer, that public banks are partners, rather than competitors, with local private financial institutions.

Public savings banks, such as postal banks, typically offer individual savings accounts, savings bonds, remittances and other services. Around three out of four postal systems worldwide offer such banking services, and such a system existed in the United States from 1911 to 1967.

== History of public banking ==
=== Ancient history ===
In the ancient world, prior to the emergence of price-adjusting markets, temples provided and oversaw weights and measures critical to exchange. The expanded legal regime of Mesopotamia included price administration and fixed interest rates set by public custom, such as one shekel per mina, a rate which stayed stable for a thousand years.

=== Medieval, renaissance and modern Europe ===
Most prominent in the 14th century, Mons Pietatis (Mount of Piety) were charitable institutions of credit that lent money at low- or no-interest, upon the security of objects left in pawn, with the stated aim of protecting clients from usury. Profits were used to pay employees and extend the scope of their charitable work. The institutions took the form of either autonomous entities or municipal corporations. Periodically, net profits from interest were applied to the entities' capital reserves, with surplus profit being used to lower interest rates in the subsequent cycle.

Many kinds of church banks served as early public banks. In their essay on the history of credit, Elise Dermineur and Yane Svetiev say that church structures "(abbeys, convents, Mons pietatis) could extend credit and recorded the transactions in their own account books. Parish wards also extended credit."

Early Catalan public banks included the Taula de Canvi (established 1401 in Barcelona), designed to draw deposits away from private banks and finance short-term debt; the first and second Banco di San Giorgio (1408 and 1530), with mission statements reflecting goals of extinguishing public debt and steering banking practices to the public good; the Banco della Piazza di Rialto, Venice (1587) to pay public debts; and the Banch de la Ciutat (1609), allowing the limited use of inferior coinage by the general public.

In the rest of Europe, the Bank of Amsterdam (1609) set out to simplify and standardize coins and other exchange and was soon joined by other Dutch exchange banks, many of which survived well into the 19th century. In Germany and Switzerland, many municipalities formed banks between the fifteenth and seventeenth centuries. The charter of the Basel city council stated that "our municipal bank is being founded to benefit the public good." The Bank of Hamburg (1619) was a public bank based on the Amsterdam model but with an expanded credit role and a grain store for the city.

Currency-issuing public banks later appeared in Sweden, England, France, Vienna, and Prussia.

=== Contemporary Germany ===
According to OECD studies, the German public banking system controls 40% of total banking assets in Germany. According to the Association of German Public Banks (VOB), the total assets of public banks in Germany at the end of 2016 was 2,900 billion euros, and German public banks have 75,000 employees.

The Landesbanken in Germany are a group of state-owned banks primarily engaging in wholesale banking. Sparkassen-Finanzgruppe banks are public savings banks operated with a mandate of public service and local development. Anyone can open a personal account in a Sparkassen bank, and they provide loans for small businesses and home buyers.

Sparkasse executive vice president Wolfram Morales has pointed out that public banks played a major role in Germany's transition from centralized fossil fuel energy to diverse renewables, and that Germany's Sparkassen banks have been significant contributors to the renewables transition.

Finance writer Frances Coppola argues that Germany's Landesbanken are in various stages of "zombification," inefficient and poorly profitable, following the global economic crisis of 2008. Coppola also argues that the Sparkassen banks are suffering from low returns to savers, low profits, and increased competition from online lenders. Writing for the Public Policy Institute for Wales, Craig Johnson similarly argues that Sparkassen banks have had problems producing profits because of its inability to give robust returns to savers. However, Ellen Brown writes that the Landesbanken and Sparkassen have supplied local economies in Germany with liquidity when private banks stopped lending and instead engaged in risky behaviors, behaviors which helped cause the 2008 global economic downturn.

=== Australia ===
The Commonwealth Bank of Australia was established by the Commonwealth Bank Act and opened in 1911. Prior to privatization (the bank became fully privatized in 1996), the bank could issue the credit of Australia to citizens in the form of loans.

Additionally, all six Australian states had established government-owned banks, most notably the Queensland Government Savings Bank, the State Bank of Victoria, the State Bank of South Australia, the State Bank of New South Wales, Bankwest (Western Australia), and the Trust Bank of Tasmania.

=== Canada ===
Established as a private bank in 1934, the Bank of Canada was nationalized in 1938 with a mandate to lend to the federal government and the provinces. This lending made public debt interest-free. In the Second World War, the Bank of Canada financed a large war effort, helping create the world's third largest navy. Following the war, the bank subsidized farmland and education for veterans, funded infrastructure, airports, and technology, and helped the government establish pensions and Medicare. Beginning in the 1960s, the Bank of Canada began restricting the nation's monetary supply to curb inflation, and by 1974 the bank was no longer lending to the government.

=== United States in the 17th, 18th, and 19th centuries ===
In the 17th and 18th centuries, governing colonial assemblies in the thirteen colonies began taking on the lending functions of banks to generate revenue and finance farming and development. The governments would establish offices called "land banks," and would issue and lend paper currency. The loans would return on a regular payment schedule to prevent inflation and ensure adherence with English sterling. The low taxes resulting from these public finance mechanisms were partly responsible for the rapid economic expansion of the colonies. The Bank of Pennsylvania, chartered in 1793, allowed the state to use its dividends to finance government expenses without any direct taxes for the next 40 years.

In the early part of 19th century America, before the Second Bank of the United States was closed, states scrambled to establish fully public or partially-public banks. There was considerable variation on how much public and how much private was in their design. In nearly all cases, state legislatures created central banks to provide money and regulate other banks in their states. By 1831, over 400 banks had been chartered through acts of specific legislation in the 24 existing states. In many instances, legislatures made policy decisions about the types of loans and credits these banks were to provide. Some of these state-run institutions duplicated the success of colonial assembly land banks in meeting government expenses. For example, the Georgia Central Bank covered all the state's expenses from 1828 to 1842.

Concerning the various state-owned or state-involved banks in the United States during the first half of the 19th century, Susan Hoffmann writes:

Between the two extremes of mostly private commercial banks and almost entirely public state central banks there existed just about every arrangement imaginable. The state shared in ownership of some banks but not in governance (beyond specifying the banks' constitutions). When the state was involved in a bank's governance, its representation on the board of directors ranged from minimal to a majority plus public selection of the president. The capital of state banks consisted of various combinations of specie, mortgages on land and slaves, and bonds issued by the chartering state, other states, or the United States. Banks were authorized to provide different proportions of commercial versus real estate and agricultural loans.

At least two state banks were entirely publicly owned: the Vermont State Bank, and the Bank of Kentucky (which was later replaced by the equally public Bank of the Commonwealth of Kentucky). These banks, like the Bank of North Dakota later, were owned entirely by the state, governed by legislatively-appointed officials, and banked on the credit of the state.

=== The Bank of North Dakota ===
The Bank of North Dakota (BND) is a state-owned and state-run financial institution, based in Bismarck, North Dakota. Under state law, the bank is the State of North Dakota doing business as the Bank of North Dakota. The state and its agencies are required to place their funds in the bank.

The Bank of North Dakota was established by revolutionary populists in the Non-Partisan League, or NPL, whose platform was "public ownership of economic infrastructure." Limited access to credit exacerbated farmers' crises in the latter years of the 19th century and was instrumental to agrarian populist revolt. In response to price manipulation and market domination from Minneapolis and Chicago, the NPL advocated state control of mills, grain elevators, banks and other farm-related industries.

Initially, the Bank of North Dakota struggled for legitimacy. Minnesota and east coast banks made considerable efforts to undermine the BND. In 1931 and 1932, delinquencies on the bank's debts were sixty six percent of the total due.

Today, the BND plays an integral role in North Dakota's economic development. Its mission is to "promote agriculture, commerce, and industry" and "be helpful to and assist in the development of... financial institutions... within the State." Half of its loan portfolio is business and agricultural loans originated by community banks, with partial funding by BND. This allows BND to expand the lending capacity of North Dakota's community banking industry and reduces the role of out-of-state banks in North Dakota's financial system. BND also funds disaster and farm relief, public infrastructure, schools, and student loans. Interest payments are annually paid back to the state in the form of dividend payments.

In 2017, the Bank of North Dakota recorded record profits for the fourteenth year in a row.

Yolanda K. Kodrzycki and Tal Elmatad of the Federal Reserve Bank of Boston's New England Public Policy Center argued in a report in 2011 that North Dakota's model was inapplicable to Massachusetts, which has a much larger population and more complex lending needs. They argue that the costs of starting up a state-owned bank "could be significant," requiring "funds roughly equal to one-fifth of the state's general obligation debt." They also conclude that certain market failures might call for "establishing a public bank that differs from the one in North Dakota . . . "

=== The Reconstruction Finance Corporation ===
Between 1932 and 1957, a government corporation in the United States called the Reconstruction Finance Corporation (RFC) provided financial support to state and local governments and made loans to banks, railroads, mortgage associations, and other businesses. RFC loans were "self-liquidating," meaning that they drew revenue from the income streams created by the loans, such as the tolls from RFC-financed bridges and tunnels. RFC-financed projects included the San Francisco Bay Bridge, the California Aqueduct, bridges over the Mississippi River, and the Pennsylvania Turnpike.

=== Public banking movements in the United States ===
Between the Great Depression and the present time, many states attempted to create public banks through referendums or legislation. These attempts were often opposed by state chambers of commerce and other private financial interests, such as in the 1970s when the New York State Assembly filed legislation to establish a state-owned bank but was opposed by the New York Chamber of Commerce and the New York Stock Exchange.

In 2016 and 2017, several candidates nationwide ran on public banking platforms, with some, like New Jersey Governor Phil Murphy, achieving victory. A renewed interest in municipal public banks has driven movements in Los Angeles, Oakland, Seattle, Santa Fe, San Francisco, and other cities. Meanwhile, states' moves towards cannabis legalization, because of the complications in cannabis-related banking deposits and financial transactions, has led to calls for state- and city-owned banks to serve cannabis businesses, culminating in the California State Senate's passage of a bill in 2018 to create such banks. The bill was signed into law by Governor Gavin Newsom on October 2, 2019.

=== Public banking efforts in California ===
The California state legislature approved AB 857 (the Public Banking Act) on September 13, 2019. On October 2, 2019, Governor Gavin Newsom signed AB 857 into law. AB 857 allows local governments to start their own public bank - specifically, to "authorize the lending of public credit to public banks and authorize public ownership of stock in public banks for the purpose of achieving cost savings, strengthening local economies, supporting community economic development, and addressing infrastructure and housing needs for localities." AB 857 was conceived of by the California Public Banking Alliance, a grassroots network of activists representing 10 California cities, and introduced in the legislature by Assemblymembers David Chiu and Miguel Santiago on February 19, 2019. AB 857 received wide popular support with 180 major labor unions, civic, community organizations, and the California Democratic Party endorsing the bill. In a show of support by local governments, 17 California cities and counties passed local resolutions to endorse AB 857, the Public Banking Act, including: the cities of Los Angeles, San Diego, Oakland, Long Beach, Santa Rosa, Beverly Hills, Berkeley, Richmond, Santa Cruz, Huntington Park, Eureka, and Watsonville, the Counties of Alameda and Santa Cruz, and the City and County of San Francisco.

In 2018, the Los Angeles City Council introduced Measure B, a ballot measure to allow Los Angeles to form a municipal bank. The Measure B campaign was led by Public Bank LA, a volunteer organization advocating for a Los Angeles municipal bank. With only four months to organize and limited funding, Measure B was able to gain 44 percent of the vote, although the measure did not pass. In light of the fact that many progressive ballot issues that challenged well-funded business interests routinely get buried by 3–1 margins, this strong showing was all the more impressive. The Los Angeles Times Editorial Board called a public bank "risky, expensive and a potential waste of tax dollars," while a contributing writer to the Los Angeles Times Opinion and executive editor of the American Prospect highlighted the success of the Bank of North Dakota and the 250-year old German public banking system in the growing support for a public bank in Los Angeles, stating "No serious look at L.A.'s housing supply or its small-business climate would give anyone the impression that our existing mega-banks are interested in making the city great again. That will require a dedicated commitment to local investment... Any new public enterprise is likely to encounter such obstacles. Newness has been California's stock in trade since its founding, and when accompanied by talent and judgment, innovation has produced many of the state's signature enterprises."

In March 2019, the San Francisco Office of the Treasurer & Tax Collector published a 151-page feasibility study for a public bank. The study analyzed three approaches to start a public bank in San Francisco, with an estimated appropriation required to for the bank to break even between $184 million and $3.9 billion, but highlights "[i]t is important to note that the length of time a model projects for annual bank breakeven depends on a variety of factors such as expenses, revenue, and growth rates. Adjusting any of these levers can shorten or lengthen the time it takes for the bank model to break even for the year for the first time.

=== Public banking efforts in New York ===
The New York public banking act, or S5565C, was introduced by NY State Senator James Sanders Jr. in 2019. The act would allow public banks to exist, clarify how they would run, and require them to incorporate as a benefit corporation.

== Theoretical perspectives on public banking ==
=== Interest ===
Interest, or payment from a borrower or deposit-taking institution to a lender or depositor, increases the overall costs of goods and services. Critics of high interest payments say that 35% to 40% of the money paid for goods and services actually goes to interest payments to finance the chains of supply, production, and distribution necessary for delivery of products. Governments pay similarly high rates of interest for capital projects such as infrastructure and schools. Thus, public banks, which do not need to charge high interest rates the way private banks must do in the service of shareholders, would arguably lower the cost of interest on public projects, and on those private endeavors a public bank was directed to support.

=== Money creation ===
Banks are often held to be mere financial intermediaries, taking deposits and lending money from those deposits. Others disagree with this view and point out that banks create money through lending, and that banks lend far more than their deposit base. For example, Robert C. Hockett of Cornell Law School argues that the belief that banks are mainly intermediaries between savers and borrowers is false. Rather, the capacity to lend at a rate not strictly tied to a bank's deposits is, for Hockett, a reason for the function of banking to be a public utility instead of a strictly private enterprise.

Banks hold less in reserve than their deposit liabilities, but those deposit liabilities are also functionally money. Thus, the very practice of fractional reserve banking grows the money supply beyond banks' deposit bases. Nations' central banks attempt to regulate that growth through interest rates, reserve requirements, and capital adequacy requirements, although most advanced economies today have deprioritized reserve requirements.

Acceptance of the view that banks create money is widespread. Authors writing on behalf of the Bank of England have explained that, rather than banks receiving and then loaning deposits specifically, banks loan money, creating matching deposits in borrowers' bank accounts, thus creating "new money." Western Michigan University political scientist Susan Hoffmann, author of Politics and Banking, opens that book by declaring that Congress has historically struggled with the reality that banks create money and that money itself arises "in an institutionalized decision process." This became apparent to the directors of the Bank of Amsterdam in the 17th century, when they realized that loaning out deposits created money for borrowers while the same amount still sat in the accounts of the original depositors.

Professor Richard Werner of the University of Southampton has utilized empirical research to conclude in favor of the credit creation theory, and that "banks can individually create money out of nothing." Two former members of the Federal Reserve Bank of Minneapolis, Chari and Phelan, refer to the process of fractional-reserve banking as "private money creation."

Some scholars and authors disagree with the argument that banks create money by lending it. Austrian School economists, for example, emphasize that only one party at a time can have a legitimate claim on the same unit of deposit. Those who deny that banks create money may argue that the process of lending gives the outsider the false appearance of money creation due to the recording of the same asset twice, once as a deposit entry and once as an asset account entry. Rather, the two figures are transactional representations of the same unit of money.

Other scholars and authors qualify their belief that banks create money by following up with an account of what happens to that money when loans are repaid. Thus, Mcleay, et al. point out: "Just as taking out a new loan creates money, the repayment of bank loans destroys money."

David Korten and others from the New Economy Working Group argue that the power to create and allocate money ought to be decentralized and democratized by making such power reside in community banks.

=== Public banks and economic growth ===
Svetlana Andrianova, Pancios Demetriades, and Anja Shortland use data from several countries for 1995-2007 and conclude that a high degree of government ownership of banks facilitates faster growth than little government ownership.

Mark A. Calabria of the Cato Institute cites the corruption of Fannie Mae and Freddie Mac as evidence of public sector finance's mismanagement. Calabria also argues that the Bank of North Dakota's success is exaggerated and that public-sector banking decreases economic growth. He concludes, "When the government owns the banks, lending decisions become increasingly driven by politics rather than economics." The Public Banking Institute has argued that Calabria's conclusions are based on research that doesn't incorporate the Bank of North Dakota; that Calabria doesn't compare the performance and corruption histories of public banks to private banks, and that he uses an insufficient number of examples to reach his conclusions.

Researchers at the John F. Kennedy School of Government Department of Economics at Harvard University, Rafael La Porta, Florencio Lopez-de-Silanes, and Andrei Shleifer noted in a 2000 paper that government ownership of banks is pervasive around the world and in particular countries with low levels of per capital income and underdeveloped financial systems. The researchers wrote "that higher government ownership of banks is associated with slower subsequent development of the financial system, lower economic growth, and, in particular, lower growth of productivity."

== Public banks by country ==
=== Argentina ===
- Banco de la Nación Argentina
- Banco Ciudad
- Banco Provincia

=== Australia ===
- Export Finance and Insurance Corporation

=== Belgium ===
- Belfius

=== Bolivia ===
- Banco Unión

=== Brazil ===
- Caixa Econômica Federal
- Public companies controlled by the government
  - Bank of Brazil
  - BANESE
  - BASA
  - Banrisul
  - Banestes
  - Bank of Brasilia
- Development finance institutions
  - Brazilian Development Bank
  - BADESC
  - BDMG
  - BANDES
  - Banco do Nordeste

=== Canada ===
- ATB Financial (Alberta Treasury Branches)

=== Chile ===
- Banco del Estado de Chile

=== China ===
- Industrial and Commercial Bank of China
- Bank of China
- Agricultural Bank of China
- China Construction Bank
- Postal Savings Bank of China
- Bank of Communications

=== Costa Rica ===
- Banco de Costa Rica
- Banco Nacional de Costa Rica
- Banco Popular
- Banco Hipotecario de la Vivienda

=== France ===
- La Banque Postale (Created on January 1, 2006, through the transfer of financial services of La Poste)
- Caisse des Depots et Consignations
- Crédit Municipal de Paris

=== Germany ===
- Sparkassen-Finanzgruppe

=== Iceland ===
- Landsbankinn
- Íslandsbanki

=== India ===
Public banks (Government Shareholding %, as at end-June 2021)

- Punjab & Sind Bank (98.07%)
- Indian Overseas Bank (96.4%)
- UCO Bank (95.39%)
- Bank of Maharashtra (93.33%)
- Central Bank of India (93.08%)
- Union Bank of India (83.5%)
- Bank of India (81.41%)
- Indian Bank (78.86%)
- Punjab National Bank (73.1%)
- Canara Bank (69.33%)
- Bank of Baroda (64.0%)
- State Bank of India (55.0%)

=== Italy ===
- Tavola Pecuniaria, first historical model of the system of public banks (15th century)
- Cassa Depositi e Prestiti
- BancoPosta
- Banca Monte dei Paschi di Siena

=== Kenya ===
National Bank of Kenya is a commercial bank founded in 1968. Its shares are listed on the Nairobi Stock Exchange and are majority owned (70%) jointly by the Government of Kenya and by the state owned National Social Security Fund of Kenya.

=== Malaysia ===
- Bank Simpanan Nasional

=== Mexico ===
- Banco del Bienestar

=== New Zealand ===
- Kiwibank

The New Zealand government formerly owned two other banks in New Zealand: The Bank of New Zealand, from 1945 to 1992 when it was privatised and sold, and Post Office Savings Bank, which was created as a separate entity with the privatisation of New Zealand Post. PostBank was sold to ANZ New Zealand in 1989.

=== Norway ===
- DnB NOR

=== Portugal ===
- Caixa Geral de Depósitos

=== United Kingdom ===
- NatWest Group (UK Government owns 48.15)

=== Russia ===
- Vnesheconombank

=== United States ===
- Bank of North Dakota
- Export–Import Bank of the United States
- Puerto Rico Government Development Bank
- Territorial Bank of American Samoa

=== Vietnam ===
- Vietcombank
- Agribank
- Vietinbank
- BIDV

== See also ==
- State Ownership
- Social Ownership
- Postal Bank
- History of banking
- Modern Monetary Theory
- Community development bank
