= Burton L. Kingsley =

American politician (1879–1944)

Burton L. Kingsley (March 9, 1879 – February 16, 1944) was an American businessman and politician.

Kingsley was born in Minneapolis, Minnesota and went to the Minneapolis public schools. He served in the Minnesota National Guard and was commissioned a captain. He lived in Minneapolis with his wife and family and was a sales representative. He also worked in the Minneapolis City Engineer office and in the liquor and telegraphy businesses. Kingsley served in the Minnesota House of Representatives in 1919 and 1920 and from 1931 to 1934. He then served in the Minnesota Senate from 1935 until his death in 1944. He died at the University of Minnesota Hospital in Minneapolis, Minnesota and the funeral was in Minneapolis.
