= Bank of North Dakota =

State-owned and -run financial institution

- Type: Public bank
- Industry: Banking; Financial services
- Founded: 1919; 107 years ago in Bismarck, North Dakota
- Headquarters: Bismarck, North Dakota, United States
- Area served: North Dakota
- Key people: Don Morgan (president and CEO)
- Operating income: ▲US$200.4 million (2024)
- Total assets: US$10.836 billion (2024)
- Owner: State of North Dakota
- Number of employees: 173
- Website: bnd.nd.gov

The Bank of North Dakota (BND) is a state-owned, state-run financial institution based in Bismarck, North Dakota. It is the only government-owned, general-service bank in the United States. (Note: Limited-service governmental or quasi-governmental banks include the Federal Reserve Banks, the Federal Financing Bank and the California Infrastructure and Economic Development Bank.) It is the legal depository for all state funds in North Dakota and uses these deposits to fund development, agriculture, and small businesses.

The bank was established in the early 20th century to promote agriculture, commerce, and industry in the state. It has received praise and media attention in the wake of the 2008 financial crisis and for its actions during the COVID-19 pandemic.

According to available data, the bank has turned a profit every year since its founding. The BND has a favorable reputation among North Dakotans. Other states have tried to replicate the BND elsewhere but have been limited by political gridlock and the power dynamics in banking.

== Organization ==
Under state law, the bank is the State of North Dakota doing business as the Bank of North Dakota. The bank is the only legal depository for all state funds. The state and its agencies are required to place their funds in the bank, helping it hold 15% of the total deposits of banks operating within the state. Profits from the bank are either deposited in North Dakota's general fund, or are used to support economic development in the state. $1.88 billion of profits have been deposited into the North Dakota general fund since the bank's inception.

The bank is overseen by the North Dakota Industrial Commission, which is composed of the Governor, the Attorney General, and the Agriculture Commissioner (formerly the Agriculture and Labor Commissioner) of North Dakota. Various chapters in the North Dakota Century Code deal with the bank's role within the state. Additionally, the bank is overseen by an advisory board of seven members appointed by the Governor, two of which must be officers of banks who are majority-owned by North Dakotans and one of which must be an officer at a state-chartered or federally-chartered financial institution.

== Services ==
The bank uses its funds in three basic ways: short-term loan and bond financing for local and state infrastructure projects, direct lending to private borrowers, and banking services for local banks.

=== Public sector ===
The state sometimes uses BND's profits to help balance its budget.

=== Private sector ===
The BND also guarantees student loans (through its Student Loans of North Dakota division) and business development loans, especially for agricultural startups. While ordinary checking and savings accounts at the bank can be opened by any resident of North Dakota, the BND deliberately does not offer "convenience products" such as debit cards or online bill pay in order to avoid competing with private banks for retail deposits.

=== Bank-to-bank services ===
The BND serves as a wholesale bank for the state's community banks and credit unions. It participates in loans created by the local banks by expanding their size, providing loan guarantees, and "buying down" interest rates. Additionally, it buys loans from bank portfolios as well as community bank stocks. The bank provides other banking services to local banks, such as clearing checks, acting as depository for their reserves, and providing federal funds.

Other entities may also open accounts at the Bank; however, BND has only one office and offers fewer retail services than other institutions. Its competitiveness in consumer banking is therefore limited. The bank has an account with the Federal Reserve Bank, but deposits are not insured by the Federal Deposit Insurance Corporation. Instead, deposits are guaranteed by the general fund of the state of North Dakota and the taxpayers of the state.

BND also provides recovery funding after disasters, such as in the cases of the 1997 Red River flood and the 2011 Missouri River Flood. They additionally provide agricultural relief loans in cases of weather-related crises.

== History ==
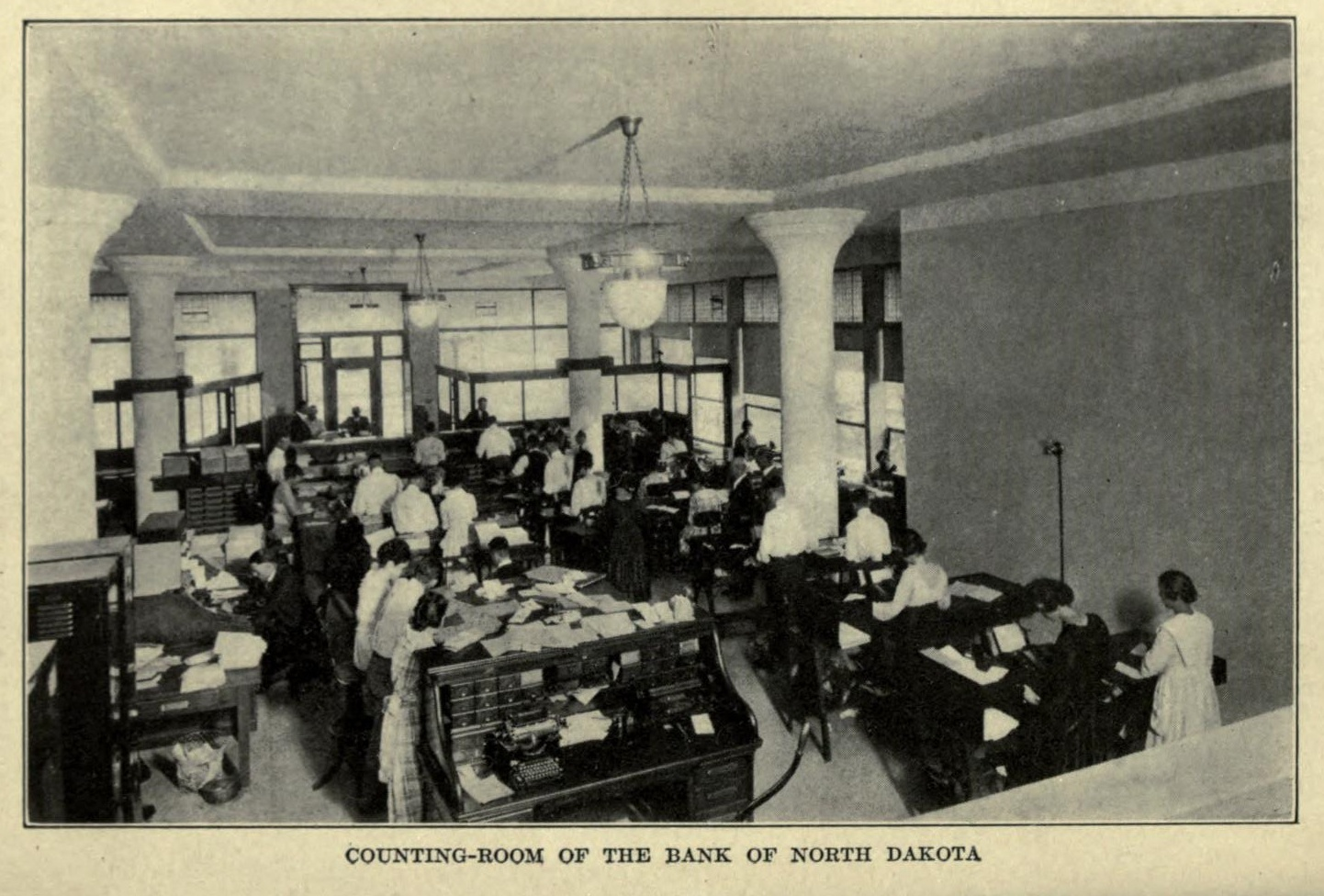
Counting-room of the Bank of North Dakota, c. 1920

The Bank of North Dakota was established by legislative action in 1919 with $2 million (equivalent to $37,140,115 in 2025) to improve access to credit within the state and thereby promote agriculture, commerce and industry in North Dakota. At the time, the economy of North Dakota was based on wheat farming. Droughts, price suppression by grain dealers, price increases by farm suppliers outside the state, as well as the high interest rates (up to 12%) set by commercial banks in the Twin Cities and New York City on farm loans made it hard to make a living as a farmer in the state.

The bank was initially conceived by populists in the Non-Partisan League, who wanted to reduce farmers' dependence on out-of-state corporations via regulation and public ownership of economic infrastructure. Grain, railroad, and banking trusts strongly opposed the new bank, and sought various measures to prevent or limit its creation. These included funding an opposition party, suing in state courts to prevent the bank's sale of bonds, and then boycotting said bonds. These actions delayed the bank's capitalization until 1921.

Originally proposed as a credit union-style institution to free the farmers of the state from predatory lenders in Minneapolis and Chicago, the business-backed Independent Voters Association then pursued political processes to force the bank's closure. The recall of NPL Governor Lynn Frazier effectively ended that plan, with BND taking a more conservative central banking role in state finance.

During the Great Depression, teachers were paid with warrants of payment. The BND paid teachers in the state full price, as opposed to the 15%-discounted payments they would have received elsewhere. In the 1940s, the Bank sold back farmland that had been foreclosed in the 1930s to the same families at below-market prices.

In the 1940s and 1950s, BND shifted towards a more passive policy, focusing less on farm loans and more into managing the state's investments and providing services to local banks. It began making transfers (akin to dividends) to the state's general fund in 1945.

The services provided by and scope of the Bank increased significantly under the governorship of William L. Guy. During this period, the bank increased partnerships with other financial institutions to provide participation loans, making its first Small Business Administration loan and first participation loans in 1965. It also provided the first federally-insured student loan in the US in 1967.

=== COVID-19 pandemic ===
The BND's support of small commercial banks was important in their ability to provide relief during the COVID-19 pandemic, leading to North Dakota having the highest density of approved paycheck loans in the United States. Larger banks were slower to move due to their increased layers of decision-making, while smaller local banks were able to take advantage of their local communication networks, understanding of their customers, and the fact that paycheck loans tended to fit their average loan size to be faster at approving loans.

== Assessment ==
A 2011 report by the Boston Fed found that the BND "enhances the viability of small banks" in North Dakota through its partnerships with them. 50% of the bank's loans consist of these loan participations or loans purchased from community banks. Additionally, 50% of total deposits in the state are in banks with less than $500 million in deposits, so BND's ability to share these banks' risks is crucial. In fact, many of these banks would be unable to service larger-scale loans without the presence of the BND. This improves the ability of community banks to compete with the lending capacity and range of services provided by nationwide and international banks within the state. Additionally, in other states where small banks need to partner with larger banks to provide these loans, the larger banks have an incentive to use their participation as an opportunity to gather information on the borrowers and poach clients from the small banks. Thus, smaller banks are led to either grow and consolidate or withhold information while losing access to larger loans. Alongside historical policies that prevented the entry of out-of-state holding banks until 1991, BND's participation in loans can be seen as the reason why there are so many small banks in the state.

As a result, BND has been described as creating an "alternative, decentralized, and regionally based circuit of capital for North Dakota [...] retying banking and the financial sector to the local economy and small business development". North Dakota has more bank branch offices per capita, far less concentrated than the United States or similar states like South Dakota and Wyoming, and has "steadily declined" in concentration since 1995.

The BND is also seen as quicker to act during disasters than the federal government, meaning it is able to provide liquidity during and reduce the financial effects of crises. The services done by the BND are done in other states through various separate agencies, such as Massachusetts' Development Finance Agency. However, the greater consolidation of the BND might mean that as they only have one reporting standard, there is increased transparency, lending efficiency, and optimal state fund allocation in ND compared to other states.

This, however, does not mean that they are themselves the source of liquidity. For example, a statement from BND during the 2008 crisis mentioned that their efforts to assist ND banks with liquidity "must be tempered with existing federal programs incl. the Federal Home Loan Bank, FDIC, and the Department of the Treasury". Additionally, North Dakota did not enjoy significantly more financial stability than other states in the 2008 crisis due to the BND, with this being more attributable to the stability of key sectors in the state's economy such as agriculture and energy. In fact, the state's economy is more volatile than that of neighboring South Dakota or the United States as a whole.

The state sometimes uses BND's profits to help balance its budget, but this may cause additional financial stress on the state if it were to do so in a year the bank was making a loss. So far, the bank has made a profit every year since its founding. While transfers from the BND have historically been a very minor part of the state's budget (less than 1%), at times they have very helpful in dealing with budget shortfalls. In 2001–2003, for example, the state used $25 million from the bank to lessen a $43 million budget deficit, reducing the need for spending cuts and tax increases.

Other states have explored the idea of setting up a similarly-organized bank. For example, New York State Assembly speaker Stanley Steingut led a proposal in 1975 for New York to start its own bank as private banks in the city were both refusing to buy the city's bonds or lend to citizens in underdeveloped areas, thus contributing to the decay of the city.

== Assets and liabilities ==
As of December 31, 2012, the Bank of North Dakota held $6.1 billion in assets, including loans of $3.3 billion. The bank's capital in that year was $463 million. The bank turned a profit of $81 million in 2012.

In 2019, the Bank of North Dakota recorded profits of $169 million on $7 billion of assets and $4.5 billion of loans.

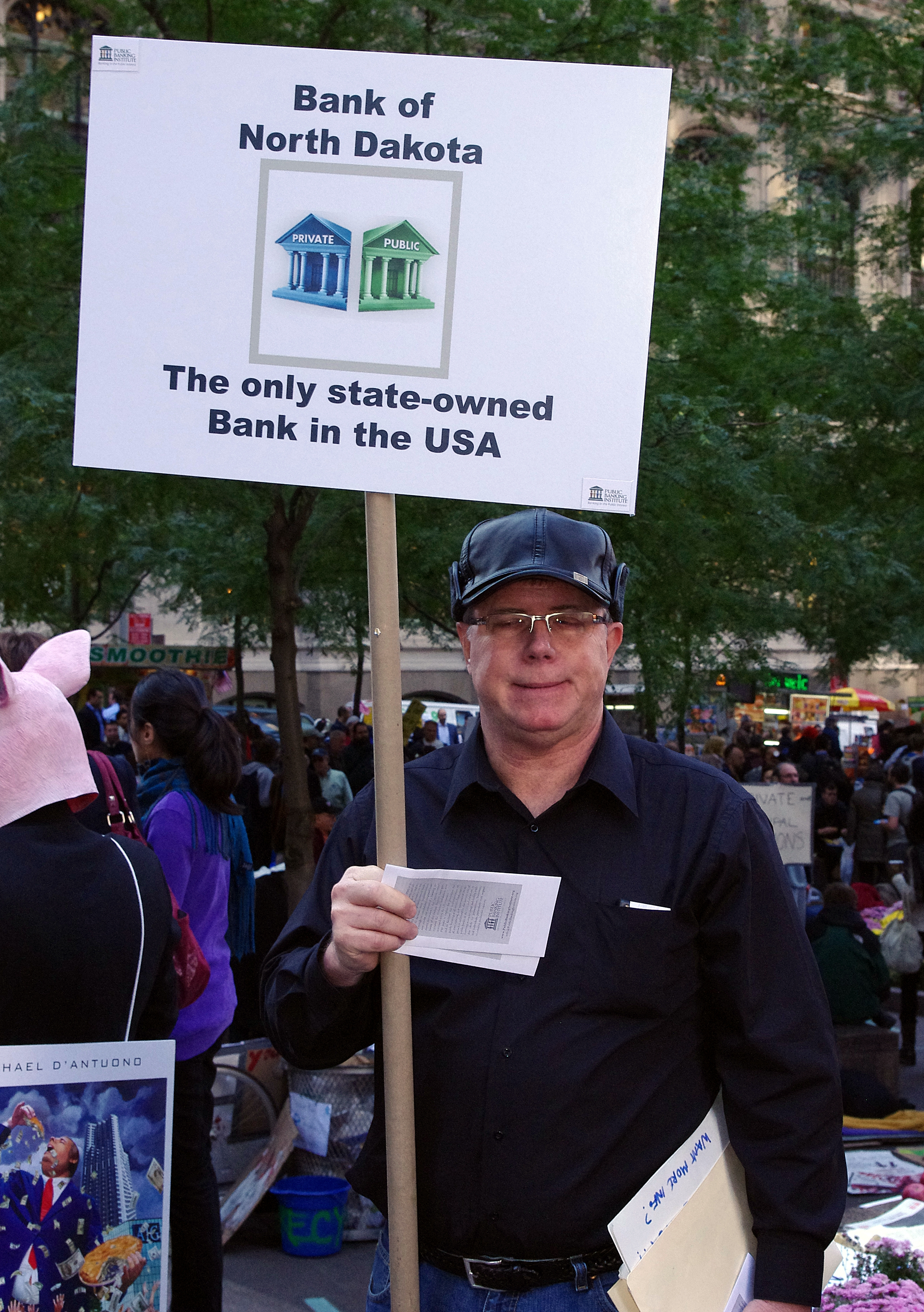
A man in October 2011 advertising the bank at Occupy Wall Street.

== Presidents ==
Presidents of the Bank of North Dakota
Number	Name	Term
1	James R. Waters	1919–1920
2	F. W. Cathro	1920–1921
3	C. R. Green	1922–1929
4	C. F. Mudgett	1930–1932
5	R. M. Stangler	1933–1936
6	F. A. Vogel	1937–1944
7	H. C. Bowers	1945–1956
8	T. W. Sette	1957–1961
9	G. M. Thompson	1962–1968
10	H. L. Thorndal	1969–1986
11	Joseph Lamb	1986–1992
12	John Hoeven	1993–2000
13	Eric Hardmeyer	2001–2021
14	Todd Steinwand	2021–2024
15	Don Morgan	2024–
