= Kashf Foundation =

Non-profit organization

- کشف فاؤنڈیشن
- Formation: June, 1996 (24 years ago)
- Founder: Roshaneh Zafar
- Founded at: Lahore, Punjab, Pakistan
- Type: NGO
- Purpose: Social equality; gender equality; women empowerment; women's rights
- Headquarters: Lahore, Punjab, Pakistan
- Region served: Pakistan
- Services: Capacity building; microcredit; microinsurance; female education
- Official language: Urdu
- COO: Mr. Kamran Azim
- Website: kashf.org

Kashf Foundation (Urdu: کشف فاؤنڈیشن) is a Pakistani non-profit organization, founded by Roshaneh Zafar in 1996. Kashf is regarded as the first microfinance institution (MFI) of Pakistan that uses village banking methodology in microcredit to alleviate poverty by providing affordable financial and non-financial services to low income households - particularly for women, to build their capacity and enhance their economic role. With headquarters in Lahore, Punjab, Kashf has regional offices in five major cities and over 200 branches across Pakistan.

Recipient of many accolades, particularly in the microfinance sector, it was awarded the Microfinance Excellence Award by the Grameen Foundation and won the AGFUND Second International Prize for Microcredit, competing against 95 countries. In 2008, Kashf was ranked no. 34 among the Top 50 MFIs of the World by Forbes. In 2016, Kashf became the first MFI of Pakistan to win a European Microfinance Award for Microfinance and Access to Education.

== History ==
=== Background ===
In 1993, Zafar, an Ashoka Fellow, was a Development economics student at Yale, where she came to know about the pioneer of microcredit and microfinance sector, Muhammad Yunus of Grameen Bank and abandoned her plans to become an investment banker. Despite this she joined the World Bank in Islamabad in the Water supply and sanitation department, where she attended a meeting about women and children in Islamabad sponsored by UNICEF and met Dr. Yunus and briefly talked about this work. During her fieldwork trip to Tharparkar, she noticed that the desire of women who wanted to work and generate income for their families. She decided to work for their sustainability and quit her job at the World Bank and wrote to Dr. Yunus about her intentions, who flew her to Bangladesh where she spent ten-weeks at Grameen Foundation, attending workshops, sessions, trainings, visiting branches of Grameen Bank and studying their business model, and researching with the clients of the foundation. Zafar traveled for a year touring Nepal and India understanding the structure of low-income households and was given a $10,000 loan from Dr. Yunus to start her own organization. There with the help of Institut Européen d'Administration des Affaires (INSEAD) summer interns, she developed feasibility and business plan for women's businesses and female entrepreneurship in Pakistan.

=== Foundation ===
After an extensive preliminary work in 1995, Zafar registered, Kashf as a "research" based program in Lahore, in June 1996, with a total staff of five women, with Zafar working as a loan officer. It took six-month for the Foundation, before anyone would borrow the money and by November 1996 it had distributed 15 loans, all of whom were women, who also became associated with the Kashf. According to Roshaneh, it was a "trust building" period. After the initial rounding Kashf, started training women through numeracy training and made the process of loan easier. The first amount of loans given were 4,000 PKR (roughly $80).

The initial two years were spent in understanding the market and the needs of clients in peri-urban and urban settings. The importance of standardized products, systems and policies, the simplification of procedures and reporting requirements, along with the significance of focusing on client satisfaction and developing clear cut financial performance indicators was highlighted. The action research phase was followed by a more focused approach to manage growth in the years 1999 – 2001. The following years were focused on growth of organization, with the main aspect of this phase was to make the branch structure leaner and more efficient; an aspect which was critical for ensuring the long term viability of the programme, along with setting up a cash flow model which would ensure the sustainability of a branch within a set time period. By early 2001, Kashf had a network of five branches in Lahore and a client base of 5,088 customers located in 214 centers. Pakistan Poverty Alleviation Fund, Department for International Development, and the Agha Khan Foundation provided core funding.

Years, 2001-2004 saw the enhance outreach and deepen product offerings through cost effective and sustainable Kashf branches. Growing with quality was emphasized, adequate controls were established and the collection system was revamped. Kashf followed a lateral growth path by entering new markets and managing dispersed units. Kashf managed growth by widening outreach and deepening access by pioneering new products like micro-insurance. By end 2004, Kashf was providing financial services to over 68,000 clients through a network of 30 branches. As of April 2007, Kashf have 94 branches, 182,000 clients and operate in 12 different districts in two provinces of Pakistan.

In 2018, Kashf signed a $5 million loan by PROPARCO of French Development Agency (AFD) for its "commitment to financial inclusion and women empowerment in developing and emerging countries."

=== Etymology ===
Kashf originates from Arabic word (Arabic: كشف), which translates as "unveiling" - Sufi concept rooted in Gnostic ideals dealing with knowledge of the heart rather than of the intellect. On naming the foundation Zafar explained, "I believe some things can get pre-ordained. One of most famous Sufi philosophers is buried here in Lahore. Kashf is a Sufi word, which means miracle or revelation or self-actualization. It’s a belief that God is within you, God is in humanity. Any individual can be a good individual. When I was in Bangladesh [with Grameen], the word 'Kashf' came to me."

=== Loans ===
Due to the economic downturn, Kashf only provides income-generating loans. Apart from that Kashf had granted the business ‘surmaya’ loan to the Kashf Microfinance Bank, small entrepreneurship loans above US$1,000 have been given. However, the purpose of the bank was to focus on job creation as 65% of the Pakistani population is below 25 years of age. About 2 to 3% loans are rejected. If people are late with three or four payments, they will be rejected the next time they ask for a loan. In cases of emergencies Foundation, we reschedule the loan to sustain the family. Kashf focuses product design, frequent small paybacks, and group dynamics in order to make micro-according financing successful, according to organization, "It’s important for clients to pay back their loans in regular and small amounts on a monthly basis."

== Mission ==
The mission of Kashf is to "Serve all with dignity by providing quality and cost effective microfinance services to low income households that alleviate poverty and enable women to become active agents of social and economic change, through building alliances, promoting linkages and developing entrepreneurship." Kashf became the first MFI to use mainstream media for social change. Today, Kashf has enabled access to over 1 million low-income individuals to micro-health insurance and has distributed over $496 million funds to its clients. Kashf piloted research in women development has 55% rate of business led by women.

== Business model and strategy ==
Zafar's organization, Kashf Holdings (Pvt) Limited, is one of major shareholders in FINCA Microfinance Bank Limited of Pakistan, one of 20 community-based microfinance institutions and banks that offers financial services to low-income clients, which itself is a part of FINCA International's, FINCA Impact Finance Network. It follows FINCA International model, sustaining itself from the income earned through its loan portfolio. Its approach leverages available capital and promotes greater transparency, sustainability and higher standards of business practices. Initially Kashf used, "solidarity" methodology similar of Grameen, wherein groups of people take out loans together.

In 2009, Kashf established the "Kashf Microfinance Bank," which provides a savings source and deposits are usually regulated by State Bank of Pakistan. Kashf targets women and families and helping in family enterprises. The foundation assess families for their business plan, validity of their proposal, future prospects, and their reputation within their community. And together they develops a business plan with the whole family looking into their debt management capacity and proceeds with the loan. Kashf is a third-largest private microlender in Pakistan.

== Innovation and Partnerships ==
Kashf Foundation was the first MFI to demonstrate a women centric model in Pakistan, they developed women friendly microfinance products and a delivery methodology that addressed women's unique collaborative strengths. Kashf introduced micro-savings for low-income households and achieved both operational and financial self-sufficiency in 2003. Kashf was the first micro-finance institute to generate a consumer protection code. The Foundation raised commercial debt through the issuance of term finance certificates in 2007 and scaled up an appraisal backed lending model for low-income clients with two tiered financial education program for clients. Kashf has achieved progress in poverty status elevating 30% of its clients above the poverty line with households have a greater ability to save and quality life. They get better nutrition and can afford better health care. On the social side, women are more empowered and about 50% of the microfinance clients are Pakistani women.

In 2015, Kashf became the first institution to offer financial services to the low-cost private school sector in Pakistan, by initiating its pilot program, Kashf School Sarmaya (KSS). Since its inception it has worked with more than 400 schools across Pakistan. Approximately 90 percent of KSS borrowers serve students from households making less than 400 PKR ($4) a day.

Kashf has worked with a multitude of bilateral and multilateral donors, both national and international partners and NGOs including: Global Affairs Canada, FINCA International, Ernst and Young, Department for International Development, Grameen Foundation, Acumen Fund, ShoreBank, Women's World Banking, Consultative Group to Assist the Poor, United Bank Limited, Askari Bank, JS Bank, Jubilee Insurance Company Limited, Kiva, Meezan Bank, OMV, HBL Pakistan, MCB Bank Limited, Skoll Foundation, Triodos Bank, Agha Khan Foundation, and among other local and international microfinance state and private sectors.

== Media and social platforms ==
Kashf had used theater for social development. Issues regarding education of girls, dowry, or violence against women have been approached through this medium. According to Zafar, "It’s part of our communication strategy in the field." In 2013, Kashf Foundation started collaborating through entrainment medium particularly of television, highlighting the issues of women in Pakistan, creating popular and acclaimed television series such as Rehaai, Udaari, Aakhri Station and Zard Patton Ka Bunn. Kashf also has several other training and mentoring programs such as the Business Incubation Lab, which enables rising entrepreneurs to expand their businesses by learning to make networks, showcasing products and studying competition. These programs have successfully trained thousands of women leading them running them own businesses. Kashf has been praised for its initiatives towards these issues.

== Awards and honors ==
- Microfinance Excellence Award by the Grameen Foundation, 2002
- Social Entrepreneur Award by Schwab Foundation for Social Entrepreneurship, 2003
- Tamgha-i-Imtiaz (Medal of Excellence) from the President of Pakistan, 2005
- 5 Diamond Statuses Award by Microfinance Information Exchange, 2005
- AGFUND Second Category International Prize for Microcredit, 2005
- Certified by Pakistan Center for Philanthropy, 2005
- CGAP Financial Transparency Merit Award, 2005 & 2006
- The Social Entrepreneur of the Year by Skoll Foundation, 2007
- Top 50 MFIs of the World by Forbes, 2008
- The One Woman Initiative Award by USAID, 2009
- The Global Leadership Award for Economic Empowerment by Vital Voices, 2010
- Pakistan Power 100 Excellence Award, 2012
- Consumer Protection and Responsible Finance award by The Smart Campaign, 2012
- Community Service Award by KFC Pakistan, 2013
- European Microfinance Award for "Microfinance and Access to Education", 2016

== See also ==
- FINCA International
- John Hatch
- Village Banking
- Microcredit
- Microfinance
- Opportunity International
