= Microfinance Focus =

- Company type: Public
- Industry: Microfinance, news media
- Founded: 2006; 20 years ago
- Founder: Vikash Kumar
- Headquarters: Bangalore, India
- Area served: Worldwide
- Website: www.microfinancefocus.com

Microfinance Focus is an Indian online news media and publication company that focuses on microfinance. It is based in Bangalore, India. Microfinance Focus publishes news and articles daily and is considered as a resource centre for the microfinance sector globally.

== History ==
Microfinance Focus was started in July 2006 by Vikash Kumar.

Microfinance Focus was awarded the "Microfinance Community Knowledge Promoter Award for Outstanding Community Support" by Solution Exchange (a wing of the United Nations in India) in the year 2007.

Microfinance Focus was launches as a publication under the Centre for Microfinance Promotion Trust in September 2008.

== Activities ==
Microfinance Focus was set up to provide a daily news source and analysis on microfinance current affairs. The publication provides daily news, interviews, analysis and reports on the microfinance sector. The website is Microfinance Focus's main platform for communication. It publishes news about the sector on a daily basis, under topics ranging from outlook of social investment, to risk management, to microinsurance, to incorporation of information systems ICT or MIS in NGOs, mobile banking, loan repayment and liquidity crisis. The online publication has also interviewed several Microfinance leaders including Muhammad Yunus, Princess Maxima, Vikram Akula, Sam Daley Harris, John Hatch, and Nachiket Mor.

== Media coverage and citations ==
Several Microfinance Focus articles have been cited by international media and blogs including IBtimes, Huffington post, The Washington Post, Guardian, Devex, Wall Street Journal, CGDEV, and Yesmagazine.

Articles of Microfinance Focus have also been cited in many research papers such as COMMERCIAL MICROFINANCE AND SOCIAL RESPONSIBILITY: A CRITIQUE, DFID - Social health insurance Protocol, and USAID-A Guarantee to Root Capital Report.
