= FINCA Afghanistan =

- Company type: Nonprofit Organization
- Founded: 2004
- Headquarters: Kabul, Afghanistan
- Products: Financial services Microfinance
- Website: www.FINCA.org

FINCA Afghanistan is a nonprofit microfinance organization and an affiliate of FINCA International. Its headquarters is in Kabul, Afghanistan.

== Background and history ==
FINCA Afghanistan was founded on August 1, 2003 through grants and loans supplied by several donors and funding agencies. Her Majesty Queen Rania of Jordan announced the launching of the program in 2002. FINCA Afghanistan began lending operations in the city of Herat on February 24, 2004. By the end of its first year in operation, the organization had reached over 4,500 clients, an outstanding loan portfolio of almost $700,000, and a repayment rate of 100%.

FINCA expanded its operations to Kabul and Nangarhar in 2005, followed by Balkh, Laghman, Kunar and Parwan in 2006, and Kunduz in 2007. In each of these provinces, FINCA established branch and market offices in the provincial capital, as well as outlying cities and districts.

== FINCA Afghanistan's Islamic banking products ==
Since its inception, FINCA Afghanistan has offered a line of sharia-compliant microfinance products, developed after careful vetting with local religious leaders, and confirmed through a fatwa acquired from Al-Azhar University in Cairo, Egypt. FINCA Afghanistan's Murabaha loan products are based on an agreement where the seller (FINCA) expressly mentions the cost incurred for the commodities to be sold and sells it to another person (the client) at a markup on the original cost. It is one of the most popular modes of exchange used by banks in Islamic countries to promote interest-free transactions (interest being forbidden by sharia law). Aside from being Afghanistan’s first sharia-compliant microfinance organization, FINCA can perhaps claim to have created one of the world’s first Murabaha group-lending products.

== Partnerships ==
FINCA Afghanistan is a board member of the Afghanistan Mircrofinance Association (AMA).

== See also ==
- FINCA Uganda Limited
- John Hatch
- Microcredit
- Village Banking
