= Zurd Paton Ka Bunn =

2024 Pakistani drama television series

- زرد پتوں کا بن
- Written by: Mustafa Afridi
- Directed by: Saife Hassan
- Starring: Sajal Aly; Hamza Sohail
- Composer: Sami Khan
- Country of origin: Pakistan
- Original language: Urdu

Production
- Executive producer: Momina Duraid
- Camera setup: Multi-camera setup
- Production companies: MD Productions; Kashf Foundation

Original release
- Network: Hum TV
- Release: 11 May – 23 November 2024

Zard Patton Ka Bunn is a Pakistani drama television series, written by Mustafa Afridi, and directed by Saife Hassan. It is produced by Momina Duraid of MD Productions in collaboration with Kashf Foundation. The series is about the struggle and journey of a rural girl to become a doctor. It stars Sajal Aly and Hamza Sohail as leads. The series debuted on Hum TV on 9 May 2025, and aired a weekly episode.

Zard Patton Ka Bunn earned widespread critical acclaim for its social messaging.

== Themes ==
The series focuses on issues of contemporary rural Pakistan like including family planning, its impact on women and their health, drug-addiction, lack of education facilities, child labor and violence against them, and gender-based violence.

== Plot ==
Meenu lives with her large family, including her father, who loves cockfighting, her five brothers, and her nephew Roshan. Restricted from education for years, Meenu surprises everyone by topping the district matriculation exam. Her brothers, threatened by her success, try to marry her off, but their father demands a high amount for the ceremony, delaying the plan. Meanwhile, in the city, Dr. Nofil, an idealistic young physician, clashes with colleagues after exposing medical negligence that kills a patient. His investigation implicates Dr. Sidra and complicates his relationship with her fellow doctor and beloved Dr. Malaika, who lies to protect her.

Back in the village, Meenu’s brothers forbid her from attending college after discovering Roshan’s secret music lessons with Gulzar Dhola, whose daughter Muqaddas is loved by Roshan. Meenu supports Roshan’s confidence and walks to college when no transport is available. A new doctor, Dr. Nofil, is posted to the village dispensary after Malik Nadir, the local councilor, promises Meenu a doctor as a reward for saving Safia’s life during a difficult night birth. Meenu convinces the disillusioned Dr. Nofil to stay despite poor facilities and village politics. She helps him with practical solutions, like climbing a giant tree for mobile signals, and begins receiving tutoring from him for her studies.

Tensions rise as Malik Nadir resents Dr. Nofil’s refusal to let villagers misuse the dispensary phone and tries to turn the community against him. Meenu faces social ostracism at college for discussing family planning. The village’s toxic dynamics worsen when Ashraf, a gambler, fails to get proper treatment for his daughter Rani, beaten by her employer. Rani dies due to neglect, and Meenu, in grief, blames Dr. Nofil. She later apologizes after learning the truth, and he agrees to continue tutoring her.

Meenu’s brothers grow desperate to marry her off, especially after her brother Meirajuddin returns ill with hepatitis from drug addiction. Roshan and Muqaddas face obstacles to their love, as her parents arrange her marriage to Jahangir, who returns from Dubai unemployed. Meenu and Dr. Nofil grow closer as he tutors her, and he eventually confesses his feelings through a letter. Meenu reciprocates, but their romance is threatened when jealous classmate Nadia falsely accuses Dr. Nofil of harassment, and Malik Nadir uses the accusation to pressure Nasreen, Rani’s mother, to withdraw an FIR against Rani’s killer.

Dr. Nofil is arrested on Malik Nadir’s orders, but after social media exposure by Dr. Nofil and his journalist friend, Fatima, the corrupt SHO is suspended and Malik Nadir loses political backing. Nadia retracts her accusation, and Dr. Nofil is released. Malik Nadir tries to blackmail Nasreen, but she, supported by Meenu and village women, publicly exposes him. Roshan and Muqaddas’ relationship is also revealed, and despite initial resistance from Meenu’s family, Ameer Mohammed agrees to their marriage on the condition that Meenu marries first.

In the finale, Meenu’s father accepts Dr. Nofil’s proposal. Meenu marries Dr. Nofil under her conditions which include autonomy over having children, support for her medical education, and a promise to build a hospital in Kesar Kalan. Nasreen gets justice for Rani and sends her children to school. Malik Nadir faces backlash and illness. Years later, Meenu graduates as a doctor and honors those who helped her in her convocation speech, marking her triumph over the obstacles.

== Cast ==
Name	Role	Note
Sajal Aly	Memoona "Meenu" Khanum	
Hamza Sohail	Dr. Nofil	
Mubashir Mehmood	Roshan	
Rehan Sheikh	Malik Nadir	
Samiya Mumtaz	Nasreen	
Ali Tahir	Afzal "Fazlu"	
Syed Tanveer Hussain	Ustaad Bhoora	
Adnan Shah Tipu	Moulvi Yousuf	
Saad Azhar	Ammer Mohammed	
Adeel Afzal	Mairajuddin	
Minal Qureshi	Muqaddas	
Syed Mohammad Ahmed	Nofil's father	
Noreen Gulwani	Dr. Malaika	

== Production ==
In January 2024, it was reported that Sajal Aly and Hamza Sohail would play the leads in Saife Hassan's directorial which is written by Mustafa Afridi.

A launch event of the series along with a pannel discussion on "A fine Balance Entertainment for Social Change", co-hosted by Roshaneh Zafar and Muneeza Hashmi, was held in late May in Lahore.

The entire principal photography took place in Dera Bakha, Bahawalpur.

== Soundtrack ==
"Zard Patton Ka Bunn"

Song by Zaw Ali & Sohail Shehzad
- Released: 27 May 2024
- Recorded: 2024
- Length: 5:19
- Label: Hum
- Composer: Sami Khan
- Lyricist: Fatima Najeeb

Music video
- "Zard Patton Ka Bunn" OST on YouTube

The official soundtrack of the series is performed by Zaw Ali and Sohail Shehzad on the lyrics of Fatima Najeeb with music composition by Sami Khan.

== Reception ==
=== Audience reception ===
The series ranks among the most watched Pakistani television series of 2024.

=== Critical reception ===
The series received positive reviews from the major local publications like The News International, The Express Tribune and DAWN Images.
