= David Bussau =

Australian businessman (born 1940)

David Thomas Bussau
- Born: 10 November 1940 (age 85)

David Thomas Bussau AM (born 10 November 1940) is a pioneer of microfinance, having founded Opportunity International Australia and co-founded the Opportunity International Network. He has been hailed for his innovative approach to solving world poverty by challenging the conventional wealth distribution model of development, addressing the root causes of poverty through responsible wealth creation.

== Background ==
A successful entrepreneur himself, Bussau started life in an Anglican boys' home and launched his business career at the age of 15 with a rented hotdog stand. Twenty years later, and with numerous successful businesses to his credit, he "retired", having reached what he refers to as the "economics of enough".

In 1974, answering a call for help, Bussau moved his family which includes Carol, his wife, and Natasha and Rachel, his two daughters, to Darwin and headed up a national movement to assist the victims of Cyclone Tracy. Soon after, he began aid work in Indonesia and eventually endowed a private foundation committed to responsible wealth creation and entrepreneurship, believing this is the best way to alleviate global poverty. He is especially remembered for his work beside Bishop Wayan Mastra of the Protestant Christian Church in Bali in erecting a contextual worship center in Blimbingsari

== Founding Opportunity International ==
Challengins belief that there are many creative and talented poor people and all they need is an opportunity. Recognising that the key to building any small business is access to credit, Opportunity International has been active for over 35 years and Opportunity International Australia currently serves over a million clients and is focused on three main countries: Indonesia, India and the Philippines.

Now retired from Opportunity International, Bussau continues his work by providing consultancy services to governments, multinationals and other organisations.

== Recognition ==
Bussau has been recognised for the work he has done in the international development sector: chosen by The Bulletin magazine "as one of Australia's 10 most creative minds"; awarded the Order of Australia for services to international development; named the Ernst & Young Entrepreneur of the Year 2003 and most recently awarded Senior Australian of the Year 2008.
