= Rupert Scofield =

American social entrepreneur (1949–2022)

- Born: 1949; New York City
- Died: November 27, 2022 (aged 73)
- Education: Brown University, University of Wisconsin-Madison
- Occupations: President and CEO of FINCA International
- Spouse: Lorraine O'Hara

Rupert Scofield (1949–2022) was an American financier and social entrepreneur who was the co-founder, president, and CEO of FINCA International from 1994 until his death in 2022.

== Education ==
Scofield had two MAs in Agricultural Economics and Public Administration from the University of Wisconsin and a Bachelor of Arts degree from Brown University.

== Career ==
Scofield dodged the Vietnam War draft in 1971 and instead joined the Peace Corps where he assisted farmers in the highlands of Guatemala. It was during this time that Scofield saw how microloans could have an effect on a community.

After leaving the Peace Corps, Scofield worked for the American Institute for Free Labour Development on land reform in El Salvador. Scofield noted that his time in El Salvador was dangerous due to landlords in the country disputing the expropriation of their plantations. This culminated in Scofield's boss being murdered.

Scofield made his first $50 loans to farmers in Guatemala in 1971. In 1984, Scofield co-founded FINCA with John Hatch to provide savings accounts, loans, and other financial services to poor and low-income people. FINCA initially focused on lending to women, with Scofield explaining "Women are more honest about repaying loans; they're also more likely to invest profits in their children."

In 2017 FINCA had over 2 million clients across five continents and a loan portfolio of $1 billion. Scofield commented that FINCA's work since its inception meant that "There are many people now with access to financial services that didn't have that access before."

== Personal life ==
Scofield hosted The Social Enterprise Podcast, a monthly podcast that explored the challenges of starting, building and running a social enterprise.

His book, The Social Entrepreneur's Handbook: How to Start, Build and Run a Business that Improves the World (McGraw-Hill, 2011), tells the story of how FINCA was built in addition to providing guidance on building social businesses.

Scofield served as the Chair Emeritus of the Partnership for Responsible Financial Inclusion, a collaborative effort by leaders from ten international organizations that promotes microfinance around the world

Scofield died on November 27, 2022, at the age of 73.

== Bibliography ==
- (2011) The Social Entrepreneur's Handbook: How to Start, Build and Run a Business that Improves the World. 273 pages. McGraw Hill. ISBN 978-0071750295
- (2020) Ronnie’s Greenhouse. (fiction) 224 pages. Independently published. ISBN 979-8694782524
- (2021) Default to Bold: Anatomy of a Turnaround. 266 pages. Independently published. ISBN 979-8496002592
- (2021) Blood Brothers. (fiction) 378 pages. Kindle Edition
