= Roshaneh Zafar =

Pakistani development activist

- روشانے ظفر
- Education: University of Pennsylvania; Yale University
- Occupation: Women's development activist
- Known for: Kashf Foundation

Roshaneh Zafar (Urdu: روشانے ظفر) is a Pakistani development activist, working in the field of women's economic empowerment. She created the first specialised microfinance organisation in Pakistan, the Kashf Foundation, in 1996 which has served over 5 million women entrepreneurs across Pakistan and continues to pave the path for women's economic empowerment through its holistic financial services program.

== Career ==
Zafar was born and raised in Lahore, the daughter of Pakistani politician S. M. Zafar and granddaughter of noted musician Malika Pukhraj. After graduating from the Wharton Business School of the University of Pennsylvania in the United States, Zafar studied development economics at Yale University and upon returning to Pakistan she worked for the World Bank in Islamabad in the early 90s. In 1996, inspired by Bangladesh's Grameen Bank and its founder Muhammad Yunus, Zafar established Pakistan's first specialised microfinance organisation, the Kashf Foundation, in Lahore, with financial support from Yunus and her grandmother Malika Pukhraj, who strongly believed in empowering women.

Zafar was one of the first Ashoka Fellows in Pakistan, and was named a Schwab Foundation Social Entrepreneur in 2004. In 2007, Zafar was awarded the Tamgha-e-Imtiaz, one of Pakistan's highest civilian awards, by then-president Pervez Musharraf in recognition of her work in the field of development and women's empowerment. That same year, Zafar also won the Skoll Award for Social Entrepreneurship.

As a result of her work in women's economic empowerment, Zafar has served on multiple global agenda councils established by the World Economic Forum, including on the gender pay gap and Pakistan; she also served as a member of the United Nations' advisors group on inclusive financial sectors. She was also a member of the Prime Minister's Task Force on Austerity and Civil Services reforms from 2018 to 2020 and was a member of the Pakistan Medical council to promote reforms in the health care sector. She has held a diverse portfolio of directorships including the Women's World Banking, the Pakistan Microfinance Network, Finca Bank, Kinnaird College for women to name a few.

Zafar has also worked extensively in the media in order to raise awareness on gender issues. The first collaboration was with Hum TV on the drama serial Rehaai which raised the issue of child marriage in 2011. This was followed by the highly acclaimed drama serial again on Hum TV on child sexual abuse awareness and prevention, Udaari. Another Kashf Foundation production, Kuch Ankahi, was aired on ARY Digital in 2023.

Spouse: Hassan Kausar (http://hassankausardesign.com)
