= Vicki Escarra =

American businessperson and entrepreneur

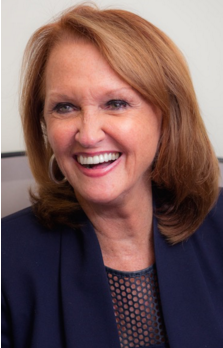

Personal details
- Born: Vicki B. Escarra
- Education: Georgia State
- Occupation: Former Senior Advisor and Executive Coach at Boston Consulting Group; Founder of Vicki Escarra LLC

Vicki Escarra is an American business executive and entrepreneur. Prior to her retirement in 2024, Vicki served as the founder of Vicki Escarra LLC and a Senior Advisor and Executive Coach at Boston Consulting Group. Vicki is primarily known for her tenure as CMO of Delta Air Lines, CEO of Feeding America, and Global CEO of Opportunity International.

== Career ==
Vicki Escarra founded Vicki Escarra LLC, a consulting firm, in 2017. In 2017, Vicki joined the board of My Next Season. She also serves as Senior Advisor and Executive Coach at Boston Consulting Group.

Vicki has held senior executive roles including Executive Vice President and Chief Marketing Officer at Delta Air Lines, President and CEO of Feeding America and Global CEO of Opportunity International.

During her nearly 30-year tenure at Delta Air Lines, Vicki became Executive Vice President and Chief Marketing Officer, one of the highest-ranking women in aviation, helping advance diversity, equity, and inclusion in the industry. Vicki led a workforce of 52,000 employees, a P&L of $15B, and oversaw Delta's operations, including 203 airports, inflight services, call centers, and cargo operations. Vicki also led the total transformation of Delta's technology, including the launch of delta.com and the creation of a successful and lucrative loyalty program with American Express that generated more than $1 billion in revenue.

Under Vicki's leadership as President and CEO of Feeding America from 2006 to 2012, the organization underwent a remarkable transformation becoming the third-largest a domestic hunger relief nonprofit. Her strategic vision and ability to establish partnerships with leading corporations, such as Walmart, JP Morgan Chase, Kraft, Morgan Stanley, and General Mills, resulted in a quadrupling of revenue. Vicki also rebranded the organization from America's Second Harvest to Feeding America, which significantly increased its public awareness, resulting in a 300 percent increase in fundraising. Additionally, her leadership nearly doubled the client base served, and corporate contributions skyrocketed from $8 million to $33 million in just six years.

"Vicki’s impact on the Feeding America network [was] phenomenal," said David Brearton, Feeding America Board Chair via a statement. "The board of directors is profoundly grateful to Vicki for her six years of dedicated service."

At Opportunity International, an organization that provides small business loans, savings, insurance and training to people living in poverty. Vicki led the creation of a long-term strategic plan, rebranded the organization, and streamlined operations, resulting in a 30 percent increase in global fundraising, the expansion of the organization's work around the world, and the placement of $1.4 billion of capital in the marketplace. Under her leadership, the organization made significant strides towards its goal of creating 20 million jobs by 2020, due in large part to Vicki's success in strengthening partnerships with corporate and institutional donors, such as Caterpillar, MasterCard and John Deere. At the end of 2015, more than 14 million clients in 24 countries across Africa, Asia, Latin America and Europe, were using an Opportunity International loan, savings account, insurance policy or training to work their way out of poverty.

Vicki’s extensive private sector board experience includes serving as a director for A. G. Edwards., Health Net, Centene, and DocuSign along with many nonprofit boards, including Start Early, Plan USA, WHAM (Women's Health Access Matters), MAVEN Project and the Atlanta Woodruff Arts Center. Vicki was also the first and only female chairperson of the Atlanta Convention & Visitors Bureau, assisting Mayor Shirley Franklin with the Brand Atlanta Campaign.

== Awards ==
Escarra's outstanding achievements have earned her numerous awards and accolades, including the Committee of 200 Annual Luminary Award presented by Accenture for recognizing the role education and training play in helping people secure employment and the Four Freedoms Award from the Roosevelt Institute which honors people who embody Franklin Delano Roosevelt’s vision for democracy in their life and work. She was also presented the Women Extraordinaire Award by the International Women Associates, the Women of Influence Award by the Chicago Business Journal, and the Pow! Award from Womenetics for her work in promoting the role of women in society. She was named among America's top 50 most powerful and influential executives by The NonProfit Times for three consecutive years and was honored with the Women of Achievement Award by the YWCA.

Escarra is a recognize thought leader, frequently featured in prominent business media outlets such as The Wall Street Journal, New York Times, Forbes, Bloomberg and Harvard Business Review.

== Life ==
Vicki Escarra was born in Atlanta, Georgia, and raised near Decatur. She is the proud mother of two adult daughters, Emily and Kathryn. After spending more than a decade in Chicago from 2006 to 2022, she returned to her hometown of Atlanta where she currently resides.

Vicki earned a Bachelor's degree in Psychology and Business at Georgia State University and completed executive courses including the Executive Management Program at Columbia University and the Executive Leadership Program at Harvard University.
