= CVECA =

A CVECA is a self-reliant village savings and credit bank (from the French Caisse Villageoise d'Epargne et de Crédit Autogérée). CVECAs are designed to operate in rural areas with clients who are primarily subsistence farmers, with minimal non-farm income. While most banks have less than 250 members, they achieve service flexibility and economies of scale through networking together into regional federations. "Each bank is managed by 2 part-time local staff and a board composed of members, all of whom have minimal education."

CVECAs are member-based microfinance intermediaries inspired by external technical support. Structurally they lie between informal financial market actors like moneylenders, collectors, and ROSCAs on the one hand, and formal actors like microfinance institutions and banks on the other. Other organizations in this transitional zone in financial market development include self-help groups, ASCAs, rural credit co-operatives, village banks and financial service associations.

== Significance ==
These small financial intermediaries "grew out of an interest in improving the traditional cooperative model in West Africa" by adapting it to thinly populated regions where there are very low levels of functional literacy and monetization. Many of the world's poorest people live in such regions. The CVECAs represent an effort to show that poor people can manage and operate their own banks. Should this prove to be the case, it will open the doors to greatly expanded access to microfinance for poor rural populations.

== Progress ==
Beginning in the Dogon region of Mali in the late 1980s, CVECAs have begun to spread around Africa, reaching 220,000 members with average loans of $130 by the end of 2003. The networks in Mali are now sufficiently developed to access refinancing through the Banque Nationale de Developpement Agricole, the rural central bank.

== See also ==
- Credit union
- Microfinance
- ROSCA
- Self-help group
