= Microfinance Information Exchange =

Financial services data organization

Microfinance Information Exchange, Inc. (MIX)
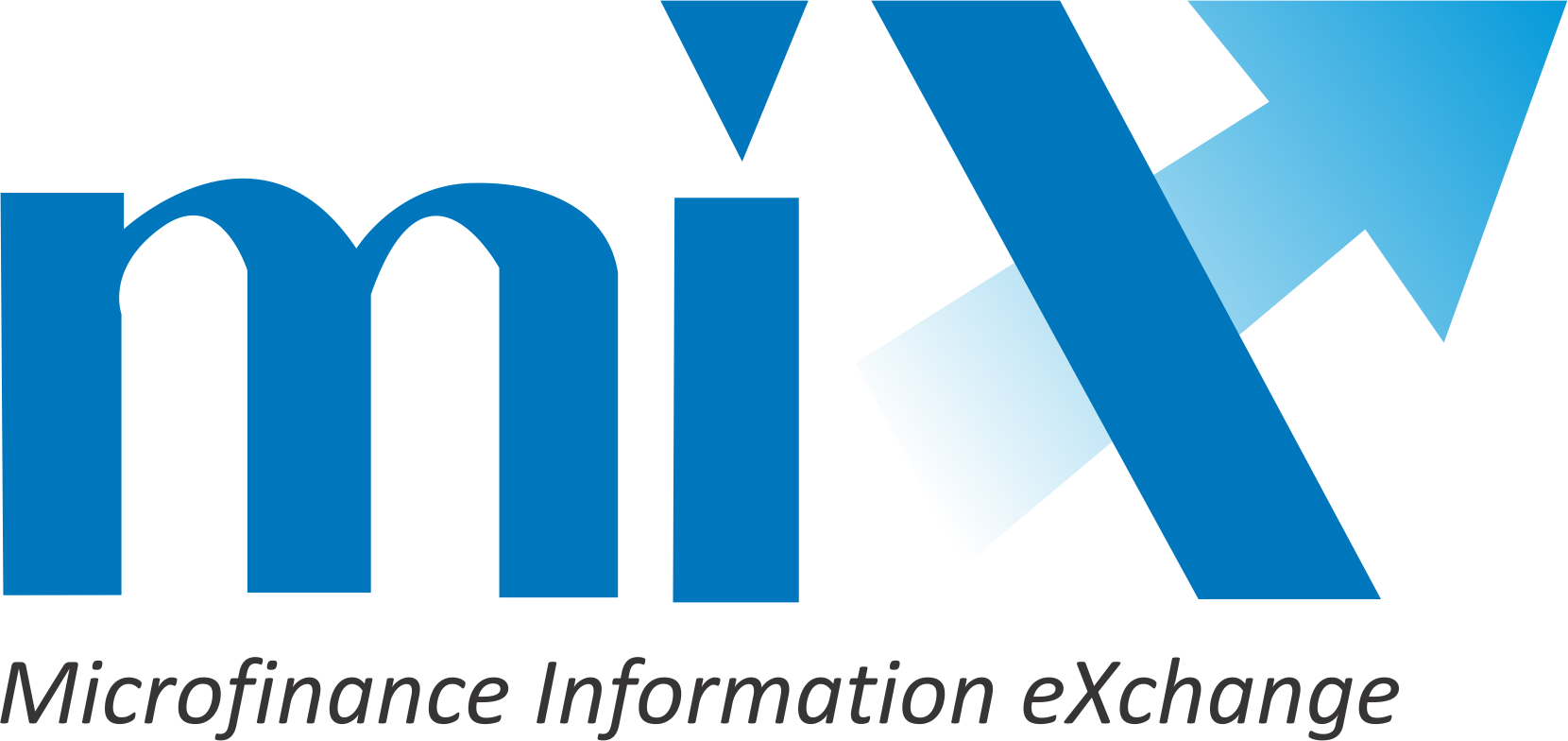
- Merged into: Accion International
- Founded: June 2002
- Purpose: Financial Inclusion
- Location: Washington, DC, United States
- Region served: Worldwide
- Products: Financial services Microfinance; Smallholder Finance; Fintech for Inclusion
- Key people: Camilla Nestor (Chief Executive Officer); Blaine Stephens (Chief Operating Officer
- Website: www.themix.org

Microfinance Information Exchange, Inc. (commonly known by its acronym MIX) was a non-profit organization that provided market data and intelligence on financial service providers catering to low-income populations around the world. Founded by the Consultative Group to Assist the Poor (CGAP) and sponsored by the Citi Foundation, CGAP, the Mastercard Foundation, MetLife Foundation, Bill & Melinda Gates Foundation and others, MIX had offices in Washington DC, New York, Lima (Peru), Baku (Azerbaijan), Dakar (Senegal), and Hyderabad (India). MIX's mission was to provide data analytics to empower decision-makers - socially responsible investors, policy makers and financial services providers - to build an inclusive financial services ecosystem. Since its founding in 2002, MIX had built the digital information infrastructure needed to bring greater transparency to financial sectors serving low-income populations in emerging markets, including providing market data on over 3,000 financial services providers (FSPs). In 2016, MIX shifted its strategy to help improve the information flow in other segments of financial inclusion, like smallholder agricultural finance, fintech, digital financial services (DFS) and green energy finance. In May 2020, MIX became a unit of the Center for Financial Inclusion, a thinktank housed at Accion.

== Market intelligence data ==
MIX collects, validates and publishes financial, operational and social performance data from financial service providers (FSPs) including non-bank financial institutions, rural cooperatives, fintechs, agricultural businesses, and others, in addition to business information from networks, funders and socially responsible investors. This data is standardized and made available to users through subscriptions on an online platform: MIX Market. MIX also produces a variety of publications covering the sector such as Barometer Forecast, Annual Benchmark Reports, and Quarterly Factsheets, as well as a number of ad hoc publications each year like the Global Outreach and Financial Performance Benchmark Report.

== Custom data analytics ==
MIX works with major funders of financial inclusion to carry out projects related to data and information provision for financial services sectors in emerging markets. Because many investors and FSPs in these regions struggle to make business and investment decisions due to the limited flow and availability of data and information, MIX and its partners identify these information 'gaps' and develop solutions to address them. Examples of efforts to support the healthy development of financial markets through better information include One Acre Fund's Smallholder Finance Product Explorer, the Council on Smallholder Agricultural Finance's State of the Sector report and analysis, and the CGAP Cross Border Funder Survey; all are initiatives supported by MIX's custom data analytics.

== Platforms ==
=== MIX Market ===
MIX Market is an online platform for delivering data and information on FSPs serving low-income and bottom of the pyramid clients in emerging markets like India, Cambodia, Ghana and others. MIX Market provides online data on over 3,000 financial service providers, networks and funders. In FY2015, 1,033 financial service providers reported data through MIX Market. Those financial service providers total 116.6 million borrowers, corresponding to a gross loan portfolio of USD 92.4 billion. These financial service providers also have savings products that reach 98.4 million depositors and account for USD 58.9 billion in deposits.

Data collection and analysis – After receiving self-reported data from financial service providers, MIX analysts “review the data, ensuring there are no outliers and extremes. [They] double check against source documents such as audits and ratings, and standardize [the data] according to internationally accepted accounting standards and to provide for a more useful intra-regional comparison.”

Data products – The main, publicly-accessible data products of MIX Market include FSP profiles (including financial indicators, trends, and benchmarks), and country and regional market overviews.

- FSP profiles – The most basic medium through which data can be accessed on MIX Market is through individual FSP profiles which provide financial, operational, and social performance data as well as relevant documents, such as audits. With this data, users can view and compare performance data of several FSPs (by countries, indicators, and trends), create customizable performance and trend reports, and create benchmarks to view aggregated data in median values.
- Country-level and regional profiles – These options permit a wider perspective on MFI performance data, allowing users to view information on a country-level scale or a regional scale. MIX Market currently has country profiles for 115 countries divided into six regions: Africa or Sub-Saharan Africa (SSA), Latin America and The Caribbean (LAC), East Asia and the Pacific (EAP), Middle East and North Africa (MENA), Eastern Europe and Central Asia (EECA), and South Asia (SA).

=== Subscriptions ===
Starting in 2012, MIX introduced subscription services to individuals and organizations that wanted to access and analyze data on the MIX Market platform.

- MIX Gold is a custom reporting product for major investors and funders that use MIX Market to collect, clean and verify data from their portfolio companies. Clients using MIX Gold include Opportunity International, UNCDF, and the International Finance Corporation.
- MIX Intelligence is a market intelligence product for major investors focused on financial inclusion. The subscription provides institutions with access to market-level data for performance benchmarking and comparison, and includes forecasts from local operators. Clients using MIX Intelligence include Triple Jump, BNP Paribas, Water.org and Oikocredit.
- MIX Essentials is a data product for use by individual researchers, academics, students and consultants. The subscription was launched in 2016 as part of MIX's website redesign and provides access to annual datasets on a 3- and 12-month term.
- MIX Discovery is a free data product that allows visitors to access limited data including organization profiles, country overviews and region overviews.

=== Publications ===
- Annual Benchmark Reports
- Barometer Forecast
- Quarterly Factsheet

== See also ==
- Impact investing
- Financial inclusion
- Sustainable Development Goals
- Socially responsible investing
- Data analysis
