= FINCA International =

Microfinance organization

- Company type: Nonprofit organization
- Industry: Microfinance; Social enterprise Research
- Founded: 1984; 42 years ago
- Headquarters: Washington, DC, United States
- Area served: Africa; Asia; Eurasia; Latin America; Middle East
- Key people: John Hatch, founder, and Rupert Scofield, President and CEO
- Products: Financial services Impact investing Energy; Research
- Revenue: $339,617,464 (December 31, 2017)
- Number of employees: Approximately 10,000 (November 9, 2016)
- Website: www.finca.org

FINCA International is a non-profit, microfinance organization, founded by John Hatch in 1984. FINCA is the innovator of the village banking methodology in microcredit and is widely regarded as one of the pioneers of modern-day microfinance. With its headquarters in Washington, D.C., FINCA is considered to be one of the most influential microfinance organizations in the world. The name FINCA is an acronym for Foundation for International Community Assistance.

== Countries where FINCA operates ==
- Latin America and the Caribbean: Ecuador (founded in 1994), Guatemala (founded in 1998), Haiti (founded in 1989), Honduras (founded in 1989), Nicaragua (founded in 1992)
- Newly independent states (Eurasia): Armenia (founded in 1999), Azerbaijan (founded in 1998), Georgia (founded in 1998), Kosovo (founded in 2000), Kyrgyzstan (founded in 1995), Tajikistan (founded in 2003)
- Africa: DR Congo (founded in 2003), Malawi (founded in 1994), Tanzania (founded in 1998), Uganda (founded in 1992), Zambia (founded in 2001), Nigeria (founded in 2014)
- Middle East and South Asia: Afghanistan (founded in 2003), Jordan (founded in 2007), Pakistan (founded in 2013)

== See also ==
- FINCA Afghanistan
- FINCA Uganda Limited
- John Hatch
- Village banking
- Microcredit
- Microfinance
- Opportunity International
