= Gamelan Council =

International non-governmental, nonprofit initiative

Gamelan Council – Asia-Pacific Public Health, Microfinance, & Development Centre
- Logo

- Countries where the Gamelan Council largely works shown in blue
- Headquarters: Phuong Saly, Laos (Formerly: Sydney, Australia)
- Type: Non-profit, non-governmental organization
- Key jurisdictions addressed: 73

Leaders
  - Director: Carlos Scott López
- Establishment: 2005
- Website http://www.gamelancouncil.org/

The Gamelan Council – Asia-Pacific Public Health, Microfinance, and Development Centre (Gamelan Council) is an international non-governmental, non-profit initiative addressing the public health, microfinance, and international development needs of communities in, on, and around the Pacific Rim. For these purposes, the Gamelan Council views the Asia-Pacific region quite broadly in line with APEC; the jurisdictions covered are claimed to account for approximately 65% of the world's population. The Council's activities, which include conducting research, making investments, and providing education and advice, are centrally coordinated.

== History ==
The Gamelan Council is an offshoot of the Global Consulting Group (GCG), a non-profit, non-partisan consulting firm created under the aegis of Global Student Response (GSR) and focused on supporting international development efforts which has since been disbanded. As GCG's efforts became more geographically focused on the Asia-Pacific region and thematically focused on public health and microfinance developmental issues, the Gamelan Council formed to focus specifically on these areas.

The name of the organization is a combination of the Indonesian word referring to a music ensemble, 'Gamelan', and an English word referring to a Native American, community-fostering ritual, 'Council' (the same term used to refer commonly to a group of individuals providing advice and counsel). These two terms capture the Gamelan Council's goal of harmoniously unifying the arrays of forces and ideas affecting the areas on which the Gamelan Council focuses its efforts.

== Jurisdictions addressed ==
The Gamelan Council operates predominantly in 73 states and territories on, near, and around the Pacific Rim, including every jurisdiction with a coastline on the Pacific Ocean and several other, significant population centres adjacent to or closely linked to the Pacific Rim (e.g., India, Nepal, and Pakistan). In 2010, the Gamelan Council also commenced pilot projects in both (a) Central Asia (i.e., Kazakhstan, Kyrgyzstan, Tajikistan, and Uzbekistan) and (b) South America (i.e., Paraguay, Uruguay, Guyana, and Suriname) which complement its other activities centered on the Pacific Rim.

These jurisdictions are divided into three main geographic groups and are listed below, organized generally by geography (i.e., Americas from north to south; Asia from west to north and then south; and Oceania from west to east):

Americas	Asia	Oceania
Canada	Bangladesh	Australia
Mexico	Bhutan	Christmas Island
Chile	India	Cocos (Keeling) Islands
United States	Nepal	New Zealand
Costa Rica	Pakistan	Norfolk Island
El Salvador	Sri Lanka	Fiji
Guatemala	China	New Caledonia (France)
Honduras	Japan	Papua New Guinea
Nicaragua	Mongolia	Solomon Islands
Panama	North Korea	Vanuatu
Argentina	Russia	Federated States of Micronesia
Bolivia	South Korea	Guam (USA)
Chile	Taiwan	Kiribati
Colombia	Brunei	Marshall Islands
Ecuador	Cambodia	Nauru
Peru	Hong Kong	Northern Mariana Islands (USA)
---	Indonesia	Palau
---	Laos	Wake Island (USA)
---	Malaysia	American Samoa (USA)
---	Burma	(New Zealand) Chatham Islands
---	Philippines	Cook Islands (New Zealand)
---	Singapore	Easter Island (Chile)
---	Thailand	French Polynesia (France)
---	Vietnam	Hawaii (USA)
---	---	Juan Fernández Islands (Chile)
---	---	Loyalty Islands (France)
---	---	Niue (New Zealand)
---	---	Pitcairn Islands (UK)
---	---	Samoa
---	---	Tokelau (New Zealand)
---	---	Tonga
---	---	Tuvalu
---	---	Wallis and Futuna (France)

== Key activities ==
The Gamelan Council focuses on three main sets of activities addressing public health, microfinance, and international development issues. These include (a) research (e.g., conducting targeted studies of trends in the public health, microfinance, and international development sectors); (b) investment (e.g., raising capital to support successful Asia-Pacific microfinance providers and assisting entrepreneurs developing new technologies addressing public health needs throughout the Asia-Pacific region); and (c) education and advice (e.g., developing seminars, providing consulting services to social entrepreneurs, and coordinating conferences on public health, microfinance, and international development in the Asia-Pacific region).

== See also ==
- Microfinance
- International Development
- Epidemiology
- Non-governmental organization
- Social entrepreneurship
- APEC
