= Al Whittaker =

American businessman

Al Whittaker (1918 – September 27, 2006) founded the non-profit organization Opportunity International and helped to popularize microcredit lending.

In 1971, Whittaker left his job as president of Bristol Myers to found the Institute for International Development Incorporated (IIDI), a micro-enterprise organization. Barry Harper was IIDI's first executive director and oversaw establishment of offices in Colombia, Peru, Honduras, Kenya, the Dominican Republic and Indonesia. Australian philanthropist David Bussau Maranatha Trust came on staff with IIDI in 1979 and began expanding its work in Asia. In 1988, IIDI changed its name to Opportunity International. Since that time, it has continued to grow.
