= Pakistan Power 100 =

The Pakistan Power 100: The Most Powerful and Influential Men and Women in the World Today is a list published annually that honours the 100 most influential Pakistani men & women in the world. The list is published by The British Pakistan Trust, and also includes those in the Pakistani diaspora.

The Pakistan Power 100 names are published in esteemed sources. The Power 100 list is divided into four sectors: the British-based Pakistani Power Brokers, the Pakistan & internationally based Power Brokers, the Pakistani Women of Power, and the Pakistani Future Power 100. The organization also presents a special award to 15 outstanding individuals from the Power 100 list.
