= John Hatch (development specialist) =

American economist

John Keith Hatch
- Born: November 7, 1940 (age 85) (United States) Pullman, Washington
- Occupations: Founder, FINCA International

John Keith Hatch (born November 7, 1940) is an American economic development expert and a pioneer in modern-day microfinance. He is the founder of FINCA International and the Rural Development Services (RDS), and is famous for innovating village banking, arguably the world’s most widely imitated microfinance methodology.

== Childhood and Family ==
Hatch was born in 1940 in Pullman, Washington. His father, a college professor, could trace his ancestors back 14 generations to the first Pilgrim baby born in the New World. His mother, born in Costa Rica, had ancestors which included an authentic conquistador, a railway-builder, and a co-founder of Pan American World Airlines

== Education and early career ==
After high school in Massachusetts and a BA in History from Johns Hopkins University, in July 1962 Hatch joined the Peace Corps for a 2-year tour of duty in Colombia. Trained as a "community development" volunteer, he was assigned to a semi-urban barrio known as Hoyo Sapo ("Frog Hole") on the outskirts of Medellín. There, he helped organize the community to construct sewer lines, streets, a community center, library, soccer field, and a footbridge. It was also in Medellin that he became fluent in Spanish, embraced Latin culture, and was first exposed to severe poverty, infant malnutrition, and illiteracy. Little did he realize at the time that he had just embarked on a career of service to the world's poorest families that would continue uninterrupted for the next four decades of his life.

Following his duty tour in Colombia he briefly served as an instructor in two Peace Corps training programs. Then, in early 1965 he was recruited as a regional Peace Corps director for Peru. Over the next 30 months he supervised some 55 volunteers working in agricultural cooperatives and credit unions serving the poorest. He returned home for graduate studies at the University of Wisconsin–Madison, obtaining an MA in Economic History (1970) and a PhD in Economic Development (1973). In between (1970–71) a Fulbright grant allowed him to spend two crop cycles as a hired labor to 30 peasant farmers in Peru, documenting the power and wisdom of their traditional farming practices. The experience taught him deep respect for the subsistence skills of the poor. For the next 12 years he worked as a consultant in the design, management, and evaluation of mostly agricultural projects seeking to benefit the poor, eventually completing over 55 assignments in 28 countries of Latin America, Africa, and Asia. Sadly, he found himself documenting dozens of foreign assistance failures that came closer to destroying than assisting their intended beneficiaries. He longed to create an organization that would allow the poor themselves-not bureaucrats, consultants, or other outsiders-to manage their own development initiatives.

== Founding FINCA ==
In 1984, Hatch finally created his own nonprofit agency-the Foundation for International Community Assistance (FINCA). He was inspired with the idea of FINCA while in an airplane high above the Andes, en route to a consultant assignment in Bolivia. He grabbed in-flight cocktail napkins, scraps of paper, and a pen and began writing down ideas, equations, and flow charts as fast as he could. By the time he landed in La Paz, he had the outline of a radically different approach to poverty alleviation: a financial services program that put the poor in charge. “Give poor communities the opportunity, and then get out of the way!” he said. The means to achieving this purpose were "village banks", a self-managed support group of some 25 borrower-owners. Its purpose was to provide the poorest families, particularly those headed by single-mothers, with loans to finance self-employment activities capable of generating additional household income. FINCA currently operates village banking programs in 23 countries and since 1984 it has assisted over 1,000,000 families, lending over $360 million (in 2007) to the world's poorest families with a repayment rate of 98%, while also generating enough income to completely cover the operating costs of the field programs themselves. Moreover, there are now over 800 village banking programs worldwide in 60 countries created by about 30 other nonprofit agencies.

== Retirement ==
In 2006, Hatch announced his retirement from day-to-day operations at FINCA headquarters in Washington, DC, although he continues to support FINCA in his capacity as a board member, fundraiser, and guest lecturer at universities. He currently lives with his wife Marguerite in Santa Fe, New Mexico, where he is pursuing a lifelong interest in watercoloring and screen writing. He is also co-founder of a new nonprofit—the Alliance of Students Against Poverty (ASAP)--which has a goal of ending global poverty by getting two million Americans to pledge "$1/day for those living on less than $1/day, thus raising $10 billion by the year 2025 to be distributed to those microfinance agencies with the best track record of serving the "poorest of the poor". On June 26, 2009, Hatch was presented with the Sargent Shriver Award for Distinguished Humanitarian Service by the National Peace Corps Association.

== Quotes ==
"Of course, our work is far from done. Yet considering current growth trends, I know that by the time I retire over 200 million households worldwide will have been benefited by the poverty vaccine of microfinance and/or village banking. What I also know is that my grandchildren will inherit a world where severe poverty has been abolished."

"...looking ahead to the year 2025, at the age of 85 I plan to take my great grandchildren to visit the "Poverty Museum" in Washington, DC, so they can understand how half the human family used to live, but found a way to lift themselves out of poverty"

== Publications by John Hatch ==
- Innovations from the Field. A Daringly Brief Summary of a Huge Phenomenon. By John K. Hatch & Sara Levine, Pathways Out of Poverty. Innovations in Microfinance for the Poorest Families. Kummarian Press (2002)
- Poverty Assessment by Microfinance Institutions: A Review of Current Practice. By John K. Hatch & Laura Frederick, Development Alternatives, Inc. (1998)
- Our Knowledge: Traditional Farming Practices in Rural Bolivia Vol:1 Altiplano Region., Vol.2 Temperate Valleys, Vol. 3 Tropics, By John K. Hatch, (1983)
- MSU rural development series. By John K. Hatch, Dept. of Agricultural Economics, Michigan State University (1980)
- An Evaluation of the AIFLD/HISTADRUT project proposal to assist peasant federations in Honduras, El Salvador and Guatemala. By John K. Hatch, Rural Development Services (1977)
- A Report on the National Association of Honduran Peasants (ANACH). By John K. Hatch, Rural Development Services (1977)
- Group farming in the Dominican Republic. By John K. Hatch, Rural Development Services (1977)
- Strategies for Small Farmer Development, vol. 1. By Elliott R. Morss, John K. Hatch, Donald R. Mickelwait, and Charles F. Sweet, Boulder, Colo.: Westview Press (1976)
- The corn farmers of Motupe: A study of traditional farming practices in northern coastal Peru (Land Tenure Center monographs; no. 1). By John K. Hatch, Land Tenure Center, University of Wisconsin–Madison (1976)

== See also ==
- FINCA International
- Village Banking
- FINCA Afghanistan
- Microcredit
- Microfinance
