= Village banking =

Method of implementing microcredits

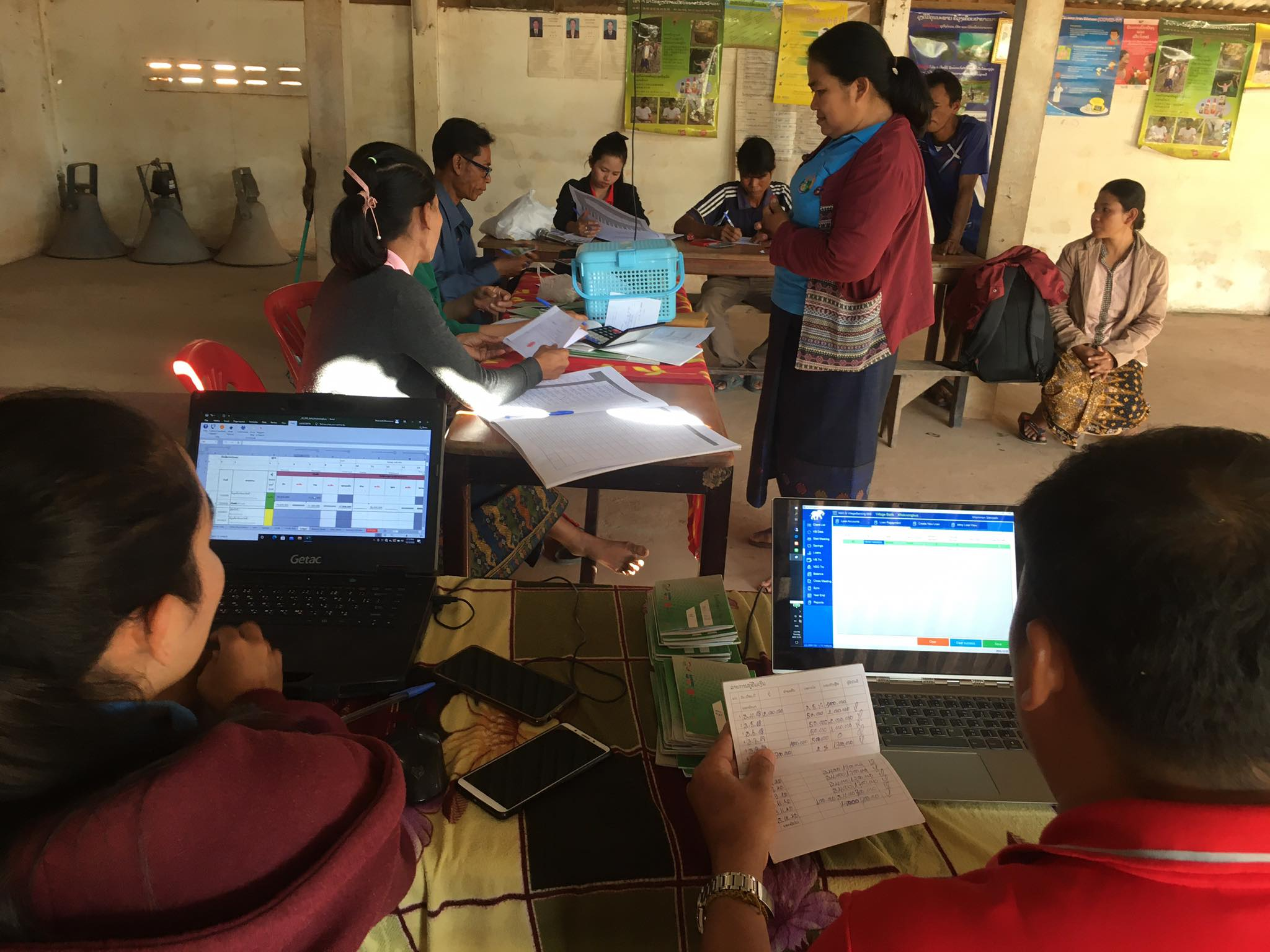
Village Bank in Lao PDR

Village banking is a microcredit and saving methodology whereby financial services are administered locally in a community bank rather than in a centralized commercial bank. Village banking has its roots in ancient cultures and was most recently adopted for use by micro-finance institutions (MFIs) as a way to control costs. Early village banking methods were innovated by Grameen Bank and then later developed by groups such as FINCA International founder John Hatch. Among US-based non-profit agencies there are at least 31 microfinance institutions (MFIs) that have collectively created over 800 village banking programs in at least 90 countries. And in many of these countries there are host-country MFIs—sometimes dozens—that are village banking practitioners as well. The latest developments globally can be seen in Southeast Asia (e.g. Laos), where digitization is pacing fast to reach rural areas with hybrid on- and offline solutions.

== Methodology ==
A village bank is a (sometimes informal) self-help support group of 20-30 members, predominantly female heads-of-household or as a joint account per household. According to some sources, in a typical village bank, about 50% of new members may be classified as severely poor—representing families with a daily per-capita expenditure (DPCE) of less than US$1, while the rest are moderately poor (DPCE=$1–2/day) or non-poor (DPCE >$2). The village bank clients meet once a week or a month to avail themselves of working capital loans, a safe place to deposit money, exchange know-how, train skills, mentor, and motivate each other. Loans normally start at $50–$100 and are linked to savings such that the more a client saves the more she can borrow. The normal loan period is four months and is repaid in 16 weekly installments. At the end of 2006, 95% of clients covered by a benchmark sample of 71 NGOs and institutions engaged in village bank lending were women.

To reduce the need for collateral (the poor man's obstacle to receiving bank loans), some village banks rely on a variation of the solidarity lending methodology. It relies on a system of cross-guarantees, where each member of a village bank ensures the loan of every other member. This system gives rise to an atmosphere of social pressure within the village bank, where the cost of social embarrassment motivates bank members to repay their loans in full. The admixture of cross-guarantees and social pressure makes it possible for even the poorest people to receive loans. This method has proven very effective for FINCA, yielding a repayment rate of over 97% in its worldwide network. Village banks are highly democratic, self-managed, grassroots organizations. They elect their own leaders, select their own members, create their own bylaws, do their own bookkeeping, manage all funds, disburse and deposit all funds, resolve loan delinquency problems, and levy their own fines on members who come late, miss meetings, or fall behind in their payments.

There was some hope in the early years of village bank development that these small village organizations could become independent and self-financing, but this hope was later abandoned. Most village banks in operation today are directly supervised by the staff of a local NGO or microfinance institution, from which they receive much of their loan financing.

== Sources of funds ==
Village bank loans typically use market interest rates. A 2006 study of 71 microfinance institutions engaged in village banking found an average portfolio yield of 27.7%, after adjusting for local inflation. The village bank itself will usually mark up this rate when it on-lends to individual members. These rates are often lower than those charged by local moneylenders in many countries, though they may still be considered high by some standards. There are three main different models in place for sourcing funds: 1. The capital for the loans is provided by FINCA with on-time weekly installment repayments collectively guaranteed by all members—i.e., a shortfall by one member must be covered by other group members. This joint liability form of microcredit is controversial, with Muhammad Yunus (for example) rejecting formal systems of joint liability in Grameen Bank's solidarity groups. 2. The capital is raised directly from the local community. Specially in countries with a "saving" culture (e.g. Laos) this can be seen as a main and successful model. 3. Capital injection from a donor, NGO or a private sector project is a third method to secure the initial funding of a village bank.

== Global Approach to Village Banking ==
Village Banking is often established in rural areas with very limited access to finance. Most of the programs were established in South America, Sub-Saharan and in Southeast Asia. One USAID paper from 1991 compares village banking approached in five countries: Thailand, Costa Rica, Northern Mexico, El Salvador and Guatemala. Another USAID paper from 1996 discusses the changes in methodologies to more formalization. The "Alliance Foundation" mentions on their website, that their program opened 25 village banks on 3 continents (Guatemala, Mexico, India and Philippines).

== FINCA / South America ==
As of 2020, FINCA International reported that its 20 affiliates worldwide employed over 10,000 people, primarily local staff including credit officers and supervisors. Each credit officer attends the weekly meeting of each of her 10-15 village banks to coach its leadership committee and monitor the bank’s activities. In addition to motivation and adult education, the credit officer supervises client attendance, monitors bookkeeping accuracy, checks the accuracy of the current week’s loan and savings collections, and checks when the deposit receipt of the previous meeting. In turn, each village bank is managed by its elected officers—a president (who leads the bank’s democratic decision-making process), secretary (who takes attendance and keeps minutes) and a treasurer (responsible for accurately handling all cash transactions). Finally, each village banker has her own passbook, and her recorded balances of loan payments and savings deposits must always be the same as those recorded in the treasurer’s record for each client.

== Village Banking in Southeast Asia ==
ILO and GIZ have run successful village banking programs (mainly in Lao PDR) for about 20 years and further developed the village bank methodology. A digital platform was created to unify and formalize the village banks in Lao PDR. Nowadays it is one of the most effective methods to prevent poverty and aliviate households out of poverty. In Bali, Indonesia, there are so called LPDs - village credit institutions established. Those LPDs are mentioned also in an article on research gate from May 2024.

== Key Success Factors of Village Banking ==
Village Banking, also called community banking, self-help groups or micro banking means to build an institution on grassroot levels. Financial literacy and money management training is a key factor to build a sustainable village bank. Further on, the village bank needs to be rooted in the community to experience ongoing support. A digital platform and the right systematic of village bank books, client records and procedures will ensure a standardized procedure, that people in rural areas can follow. Another challenge is over time that village banks will have more savings over time than loans. That helps to reduce poverty and at the same time it is a risk for the interest-income of the village bank. It is important to have an inter-village bank money market established, so that a liquidity exchange is possible.

== See also ==
- CVECA
- flat rate (finance)
- John Hatch
- microcredit
- microfinance
- ROSCA
- Microcredit Summit Campaign
- self-help group
- solidarity lending
