= Opportunity International =

American nonprofit organization

- Type: 501(c)(3)
- Tax ID no.: 54-0907624
- Revenue: $107,800,238 (2015)

Opportunity International is a 501(c)(3) nonprofit organization chartered in the United States. Through a network of 47 program and support partners, Opportunity International provides small business loans, savings, insurance and training to more than 14 million people in the developing world. It has clients in more than 20 countries and works with fundraising partners in the United States, Australia, Canada, Germany, Switzerland, Singapore, Hong Kong and the United Kingdom. Opportunity International has 501(c)(3) status as a tax-exempt charitable organization in the United States under the US Internal Revenue Code (Employer Identification Number: 54-0907624).

== History ==
In 1971, Al Whittaker left his job as president of Bristol Myers International Corporation in America to found the Institute for International Development Incorporated (IIDI), a micro-enterprise organization. Barry Harper, IIDI's first executive director, and development officer Dan Swanson helped establish of IDII offices in Colombia, Peru, Honduras, Kenya, the Dominican Republic and Indonesia.

Australian philanthropist David Bussau founded Maranatha Trust and began administering loans in Indonesia in 1977. In 1979, he joined IDII as the director of the Indonesia office and began expanding IDII's work in Asia.

In 1988, the two merged their efforts under the name Opportunity International.

In 2002, Opportunity International developed and founded MicroEnsure, a microinsurance entity providing weather-indexed crop insurance, affordable health insurance, and protection against other risks. MicroEnsure was the world's first microinsurance intermediary and received a generous grant from the Bill & Melinda Gates Foundation in 2008. MicroEnsure spun off from Opportunity as its own company, and in 2013 it became a for-profit social enterprise.

On January 24, 2006, David Bussau gave the 10th Australia Day Address with the subject "A Giving Nation." And in January 2008, David Bussau was named Senior Australian of the Year 2008 for his work in the fight against global poverty.

Al Whittaker died in 2006.

In 2017, Opportunity International's operation in Malawi was sold to southern African banking group FMB Capital.

== Annual report ==
| Annual Report 2015 | By the Numbers |
| Active Loan Clients | 4 Million |
| Total Loaned | $1.4 Billion |
| Savings Clients | 4.9 Million |
| Insurance Clients | 9.9 Million |
| Loans to Women | 95% |
| Loan Repayment Rate | 99% |
| Clients Who Bank From Cell Phones | 380,000 |
| Children Educated | 803,000 |

According to the annual report 2021, the total revenue in 2021 stood at $54.2 million and the total expenses amounted to $46.9 million, with 88% of its budget going towards programs and the remaining 12% going towards fundraising, general and administrative expenses.

== Operational model ==
=== Trust groups ===
Each week, as Trust Groups gather to repay their loans, Opportunity provides educational sessions to develop business skills and enhance personal growth.

The efficacy of group lending has been debated since it was first introduced by the Grameen Bank in the 1970s. As MFIs have become more advanced and increased their scale, it has become less costly for them to monitor borrowers, allowing them to be less reliant on group lending and peer enforcement. According to JPAL, there is little evidence on the relative impacts of individual lending versus group lending on household consumption, income and enterprise creation.

=== Local staffing ===
Today, Opportunity recruits and develops staff from the countries it serves. Its global team has grown to 23,000 employees, 99% of whom are nationals, with over 10,000 loan officers working directly with microfinance clients.

=== Technology ===
Over the last 10 years, Opportunity has invested more than $20 million in electronic and mobile technology to reduce transaction costs and bring services to the most marginalized and remote people. Satellite branches and mobile banks reach clients in previously unserved areas, like rural farming villages and sprawling urban markets. Biometric technology provides convenient and secure access to finances, even for those who are illiterate or lack formal identification. Convenient ATMs and point-of-sale (POS) devices offer the only safe method for transactions in many markets and allow clients to make transactions near home, thereby reducing transportation costs, improving their productivity and increasing the safety of their savings deposits. Opportunity's banking programs enable clients to repay loans or transfer funds in Opportunity savings accounts from their mobile device. Cell phone technology gives clients in remote locations access to their accounts.

=== Investing in women ===
Opportunity focuses its services, including loans, savings accounts, insurance, training and financial access, on women - providing 95% of their loans to women.

=== Initiatives ===
==== Education finance ====
Opportunity EduFinance is a global program partner of Opportunity International, launched in 2007 and based in London UK.

Opportunity invests in parents and educators to help children go to school and receive a high quality education. Opportunity's EduFinance tools include:

- School Improvement Loans - loans to school proprietors to help them build classrooms, install running water or bathrooms, or make other structural, resource or staff improvements to their facilities.
- School Fee Loans - loans to parents to help them pay school fees for their children on time that they can then pay back over the course of the semester.
- EduSave Insurance - a program that covers children's school fees in the event of a death or illness of a child's guardian.

Alongside financial tools, Opportunity supports educators with other tools and programs including:

- Education clusters - groups of leaders from up to a dozen schools that facilitate collaboration, group problem-solving and sharing of best practices.
- School Assessments - helping school proprietors understand their strengths and weaknesses, as well as determining a clearly defined roadmap for improvements.
- OPENeducator - a web-based resource center offering educators around the world training tools and a global community of support.

Opportunity has reached 1.7 million children and distributed $69M in education loans since 2009.

In October 2016, Opportunity announced that it received a $1 million grant to expand EduFinance from the Bill and Melinda Gates Foundation.

In November 2016, Opportunity International won the Civil Society Achievement Honor at the Children and Youth Finance International Global Inclusion Awards 2016.

==== Agriculture finance ====
Opportunity International has introduced the following programs, tools and initiatives:

- Agricultural loans - using high-tech, low-cost banking solutions to deliver financial resources to rural farming communities.
- Access to better resources - linking farmers to suppliers with high-quality seeds and fertilizers, and negotiating competitive pricing for farmers.
- Agricultural Training - partnering with agricultural experts to deliver crop-specific training and assistance in good farming practices.
- Savings accounts - empowering farmers to open savings accounts during harvest season to save profits for financial protection in between harvests, so they have money to meet basic needs.
- Access to better crop markets - linking farmers to the best crop buyers where they can take advantage of better market prices.

=== Partnership model ===
Opportunity works through local program partners to better understand and meet the needs of families they serve. Local partners must share Opportunity's values and objectives. Their stated requirements for partners are:

- A primary objective of helping people out of poverty
- Work in the poorest, largely unserved regions wherever possible
- Operate within a market that exhibits a relevant gap, with conditions that are favorable for microfinance
- Sound strategies that show their continued intent to help people out of poverty
- A demonstrated commitment to meeting people's needs and having an impact

They also look for partners with:

- Excellent, inspiring leadership
- Strong risk management and governance
- A solid operating platform and capable staff
- Good financial performance and an ability to manage significant growth
- Comprehensive business plans and projections underpinning a sound future
- A history of financial self-sufficiency of, for start-ups, a forecast to be so within two years

== Where Opportunity works ==
=== About the Opportunity Network ===
The Opportunity Network is made up of 47 organizations, 39 of which are microfinance institutions (program partners) operating in Africa, Eastern Europe, Central and East Asia and Latin America. These program partners provide loans and other support directly to families in need. Funds to support the work of program partners are raised through support partners operating in various countries including Australia, Canada, Germany, the United Kingdom and the USA. These funds are provided to program partners as either equity, loans or grants. While program and support partners have close relationships, each operates as an independent legal entity. No program or support partner acts as agent for any other program or support partner, nor has authority to bind any other program or support partner. Opportunity International was the first organization to approach microfinance using a microfinance network.

=== List of partner countries ===
==== Africa ====
Opportunity serves clients in the following countries in Africa:

- Tanzania
- Democratic Republic of Congo
- Ghana
- Kenya
- Malawi
- Mozambique
- Niger
- Nigeria
- Rwanda
- Uganda

==== Asia ====
Opportunity serves clients in the following countries in Asia:

- Bangladesh
- China
- India
- Indonesia
- Pakistan
- Philippines

==== Eastern Europe ====
Opportunity serves clients in the following countries in Eastern Europe:

- North Macedonia
- Serbia
- Romania

==== Latin America ====
Opportunity serves clients in the following countries in Latin America:

- Colombia
- Dominican Republic
- Honduras
- Nicaragua
- Peru

=== List of Support Countries ===
Opportunity partners raise support in the following countries:

==== United States ====
In 2016, Atul Tandon joined Opportunity International as the US CEO. Global CEO Vicki Escarra joined Opportunity in 2012 and served as US CEO before becoming Global CEO.

==== Australia ====
Opportunity International Australia Limited is a part of the global Opportunity International Network. Opportunity International Australia Limited was registered as a charity under the Australian Charities and Not-for-profits Commission in January 1989.

Opportunity International Australia also provides support services to its loan recipients such as business training, financial literacy training and community development initiatives. It currently works in India, Indonesia and the Philippines by funding and supporting local microfinance institutions. These services include loans, savings, fund transfers and insurance. Opportunity International Australia has a repayment rate of 97%. Opportunity International is a signatory to ACFID.

In 2008, Opportunity International Australia's founder David Bussau was recognized for his long-standing contribution to poverty alleviation by being named Senior Australian of the Year 2008.

Macro For Micro was a campaign in 2010 to raise funds and awareness for microfinance development. It consisted of a team of Canadian cyclists (Geoff Dittrich, Stu McCrory, Vivian Leung and Isabella Borowiec) that travelled over 5,600 km from Sydney, Australia, to Perth, Australia, along the southern coast. The campaign aimed to raise A$50,000 for Opportunity Australia to fight poverty. The team stopped at universities, high schools and sponsored venues along the way to share the story of microfinance. They departed Sydney on March 8 (International Women's Day), 2010 and arrived in Perth on 29 May 2010.

==== Canada ====
Opportunity International Canada is one of five Opportunity International Support Member countries, along with the US, Australia, the UK and Germany.

Opportunity International Canada was founded in 1998 by David Stiller, who worked with a dedicated group of entrepreneurial Canadian business people to launch it as a registered charity in Canada.

The current President and CEO of Opportunity International Canada is Dan Murray, who has served in this role since November 2018.

A small office is located in Waterloo, Ontario, with most of the small staff team located across Canada and working from home. Staff are currently in Ontario, Manitoba, Alberta and BC.

Opportunity International Canada is the lead Support Member in Honduras, Nicaragua and the DR, and collaborates with other Support Members on microfinance projects in Colombia, Haiti and India. Opportunity International Canada is also running a significant project in Ghana, supported by Global Affairs Canada.

==== Germany ====
Opportunity International Germany was founded in 1996 by Karl Schock, a businessman, as an independent foundation. Opportunity International Deutschland raises funds and awareness for microfinance services in Ghana, Malawi, Rwanda, Uganda, Mozambique, Dominican Republic, India, Nicaragua and the Philippines. The current CEO is Mark Ankerstein.

Opportunity International Deutschland logo

==== United Kingdom ====
Opportunity International UK is part of the global Opportunity International Network. Opportunity UK is currently serving more than 1.2 million African's by raising funds to help develop microfinance in Malawi, Mozambique, Tanzania and Ghana. They also support projects in Rwanda, Uganda, Democratic Republic of Congo, Kenya and South Africa.

==== Other ====
Opportunity also raises support in:

- Hong Kong
- Singapore
- Switzerland

== Measuring impact ==
=== Social performance management ===
In 2012, The Social Performance Task Force (SPTF) launched the Universal Standards for Social Performance Management. These standards incorporate the Smart Campaign's Client Protection Principles and set standards on: defining and monitoring social goals, governance, treatment of clients, development of products and services, treatment of employees, and balancing financial and social performance.

Opportunity's Social Performance Management (SPM) program is used in India, the Philippines and an expanding number of countries in Africa, Eastern Europe and Latin America.

The Progress Out of Poverty Index (PPI) scorecard is a tool that helps monitor the effects of microfinance on income levels. The scorecard includes simple questions related to the client's income level, such as:

- What are the outer walls of your house made of?
- What kind of toilet facility does your family have?
- What is your main source of drinking water?
- What is the main source of lighting for your home?

By assessing the answers to questions such as these, it is possible to gauge the relative income level and poverty status of a family and help ensure they are receiving benefits from interventions in various areas of their life.

Opportunity has also piloted the Social Return on Investment (SROI) methodology in both India and the Philippines. SROI is a framework for measuring and accounting for the value added to the lives of families served, looking at social, environmental and economic benefits of microfinance and then quantifying the amount of change that has taken place.

=== Challenges of measuring impact ===
There is no evidence presented in Opportunity International (OI) publications of summary-level improvements in household income or jobs created by OI's borrowers. This is not surprising, since scientific testing of the impact of microcredit is surprisingly difficult. Dozens of studies have looked at the experience of people who received microloans. The challenge has been to identify a control group for comparison: it is difficult and expensive to find a group of people who are like the loan recipients in all relevant ways except for not having gotten a loan. Two studies looked at standard microcredit clients over a short period (12–18 months) using randomized controlled trials found no evidence of improvements in household income or consumption. For now, it seems an honest summary of the evidence to say that we simply do not know yet whether microcredit or other forms of microfinance are helping to lift millions out of poverty.

Further, one of the least remarked-on problems facing the world's poor living on two dollars a day is that they do not literally get that amount each day. In other words, economic poverty is not just a matter of low incomes, but also of irregular and uncertain incomes. To put food on the table every day and meet other basic consumption needs, poor households have to save and borrow constantly. One research team presented results of year-long financial diaries collected about twice a month from hundreds of rural and urban households in India, Bangladesh, and South Africa. They consistently found the poor use credit and savings to smooth consumption, to deal with emergencies like health problems and to accumulate the larger sums they need to seize opportunities—occasionally business opportunities—and pay for big-ticket expenses like education, weddings and funerals. Over the year, the average diary household used 8 to 10 different types of financial instruments; most types were used multiple times. The notion that microcredit brings loans to people who previously had no access to them is widespread but mistaken, as is the notion that the strong majority of microloans are used for business purposes.

Finally, it seems unlikely that a year of microlending helps poor people as much as a year of girls' primary education, for example. The true advantage of microfinance is not that each "dose" is more powerful, but rather that each dose costs much less than subsidies. Social programs like primary education and health care usually require large continuing subsidies, using up scarce tax dollars year after year. Microfinancing is different: when it is done right, relatively small up-front subsidies lead to permanent institutions that can continue providing services year after year with no further subsidy needed, and can expand those services to reach many millions of low-income clients.

== See also ==
- Grameen Bank
- List of non-governmental organizations in the People's Republic of China
