= Microfinance =

Provision of microloans to small scale entrepreneurs and small businesses

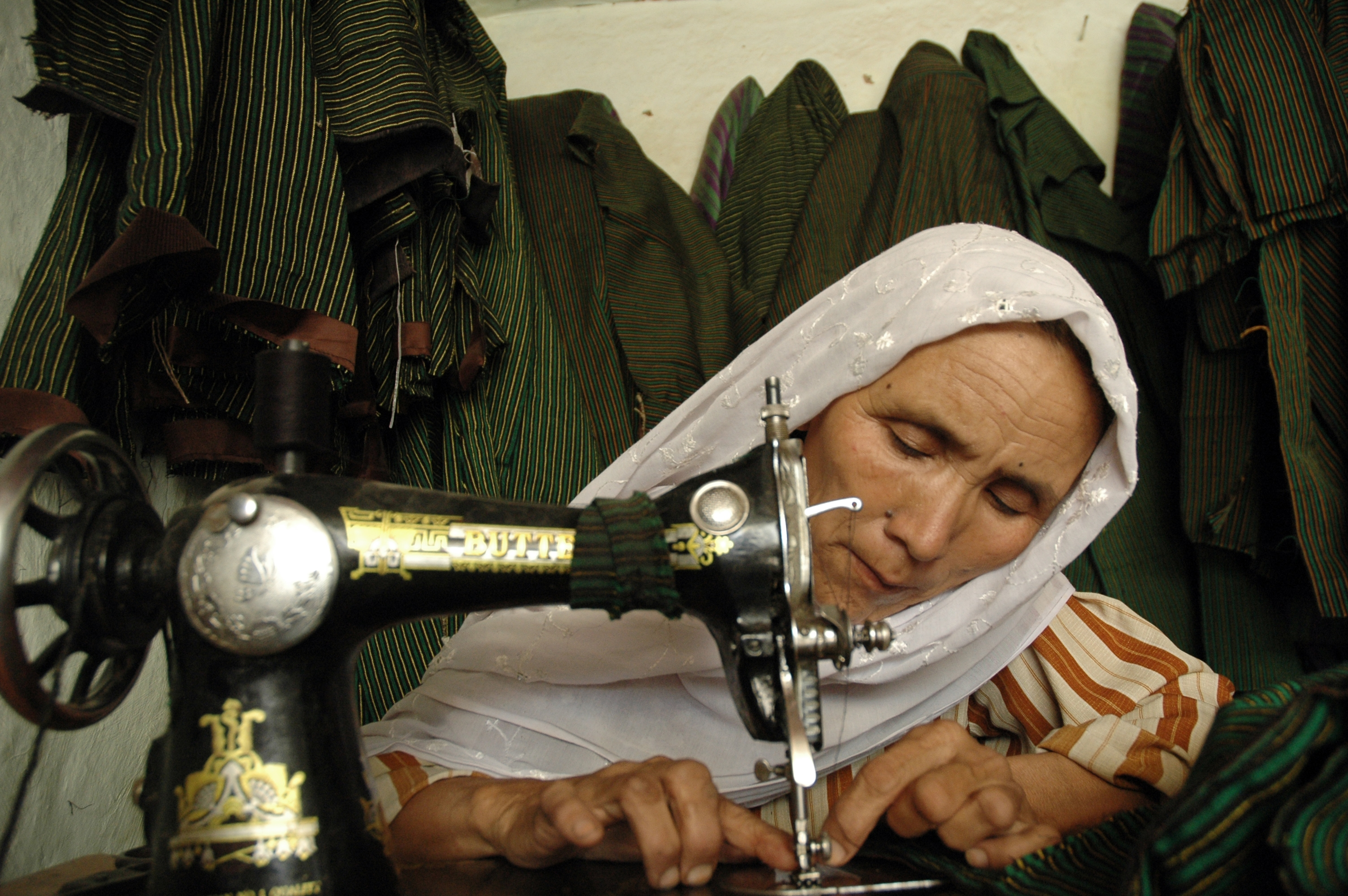
An Afghan woman doing microfinanced sewing work

Microfinance is the provision of financial services to individuals and small businesses, particularly those with low incomes and limited access to conventional banking and related financial services. It encompasses services such as microcredit, savings, checking accounts, microinsurance, and payment systems.

Modern microfinance developed in the 1970s, particularly through the work of Muhammad Yunus and the Grameen Bank in Bangladesh, although its historical roots extend to earlier cooperative lending and savings initiatives in Europe. Originally associated with small loans to entrepreneurs lacking access to credit, microfinance later expanded to encompass a broader range of financial services and evolved into a wider approach to financial inclusion aimed at expanding access to financial services for underserved populations.

Microfinance has been promoted as a means of reducing poverty, supporting economic development, fostering entrepreneurship, and improving households' ability to manage financial risks. Its effectiveness and social impact remain subjects of debate, particularly regarding poverty reduction, borrower over-indebtedness, interest rates, financial sustainability, and its impact on women and low-income communities.

‘Microfinance’ now generally refers to a broad array of formal financial services tailored for poor and low-income individuals, and others marginalized from conventional financial systems. This expanded perspective recognizes the essential need for diverse financial services, such as savings and insurance.

Some recent developments have been the expansion of digital financial services and greater emphasis on understanding the wider ecosystem in which microfinance institutions operate to improve the sustainability and effectiveness of financial inclusion initiatives.

== History ==
Over the past centuries, practical visionaries, from the Franciscan friars who founded the community-oriented pawnshops of the 15th century to the founders of the European credit union movement in the 19th century (such as Friedrich Wilhelm Raiffeisen) and the founders of the microcredit movement in the 1970s (such as Muhammad Yunus and Al Whittaker), have tested practices and built institutions designed to bring the kinds of opportunities and risk-management tools that financial services can provide to the doorsteps of poor people.

The origins of microfinancing can be traced back as far as the 1720s in Ireland with the establishment of the Irish Loan Funds under the writer, philosopher, and satirist Jonathan Swift (1667–1745). Swift, who wrote much on the poverty of Ireland which was then a British colony, may be credited with starting the loan fund system when he created a small fund with £500 of capital for use by poor but creditworthy people who had projects that promised high return on investment but who lacked collateral. The small loans were made to "poor industrious tradesmen" for reproductive purposes: the seed money would multiply.

The practice later appeared elsewhere in Europe from the middle of the 1800s, when the theorist Lysander Spooner was writing about the benefits of small credits to entrepreneurs and farmers as a way of getting the people out of poverty. Independently of Spooner, Friedrich Wilhelm Raiffeisen founded the first cooperative lending banks to support farmers in rural Germany.

The modern use of the expression "microfinancing" has roots in the 1970s when Grameen Bank of Bangladesh, founded by microfinance pioneer Muhammad Yunus, was starting and shaping the modern industry of microfinancing. The approach of microfinance was institutionalized by Yunus in 1976, with the foundation of Grameen Bank in Bangladesh. Another pioneer in this sector is Pakistani social scientist Akhtar Hameed Khan.

Since people in the developing world still largely depend on subsistence farming or basic food trade for their livelihood, significant resources have gone into supporting smallholder agriculture in developing countries.

== Poverty ==
Financial needs and financial services.

In developing economies, and particularly in rural areas, many activities that would be classified in the developed world as financial are not monetized: that is, money is not used to carry them out. This is often the case when people need the services money can provide but do not have dispensable funds required for those services. This forces them to revert to other means of acquiring the funds. In their book, The Poor and Their Money, Stuart Rutherford and Sukhwinder Arora cite several types of needs:

- Lifecycle Needs: such as weddings, funerals, childbirth, education, home building, holidays, festivals, widowhood and old age
- Personal Emergencies: such as sickness, injury, unemployment, theft, harassment or death
- Disasters: such as wildfires, floods, cyclones and man-made events like war or bulldozing of dwellings
- Investment Opportunities: expanding a business, buying land or equipment, improving housing, securing a job, etc.

People find creative and often collaborative ways to meet these needs, primarily through creating and exchanging different forms of non-cash value. Common substitutes for cash vary from country to country, but typically include livestock, grains, jewelry and precious metals. As Marguerite S. Robinson describes in his book, The Micro Finance Revolution: Sustainable Finance for the Poor, the 1980s demonstrated that "micro finance could provide large-scale outreach profitably", and in the 1990s, "micro finance began to develop as an industry". In the 2000s, the microfinance industry's objective was to satisfy the unmet demand on a much larger scale, and to play a role in reducing poverty. While much progress has been made in developing a viable, commercial microfinance sector in the last few decades, several issues remain that need to be addressed before the industry will be able to satisfy massive worldwide demand. The obstacles or challenges in building a sound commercial microfinance industry include:

- Inappropriate donor subsidies
- Poor regulation and supervision of deposit-taking microfinance institutions (MFIs)
- Few MFIs that meet the needs for savings, remittances or insurance
- Limited management capacity in MFIs
- Institutional inefficiencies
- Need for more dissemination and adoption of rural, agricultural microfinance methodologies
- Members' lack of collateral to secure a loan

Microfinance is the proper tool to reduce income inequality, allowing citizens from lower socio-economical classes to participate in the economy. Moreover, its involvement has shown to lead to a downward trend in income inequality.

== Ways in which poor people manage their money ==
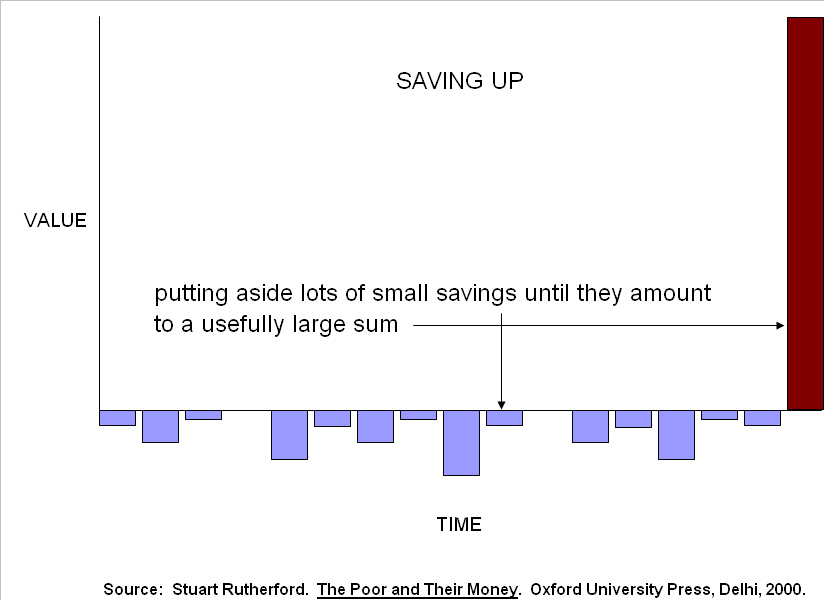
Saving up

Rutherford argues that the basic problem that poor people face as money managers is to gather a "usefully large" amount of money. Building a new home may involve saving and protecting diverse building materials for years until enough are available to proceed with construction. Children's schooling may be funded by buying chickens and raising them for sale as needed for expenses, uniforms, bribes, etc. Because all the value is accumulated before it is needed, this money management strategy is referred to as "saving up".

Often, people do not have enough money when they face a need, so they borrow. A poor family might borrow from relatives to buy land, from a moneylender to buy rice, or from a microfinance institution to buy a sewing machine. Since these loans must be repaid by saving after the cost is incurred, Rutherford calls this 'saving down'. Rutherford's point is that microcredit is addressing only half the problem, and arguably the less important half: poor people borrow to help them save and accumulate assets. However, microfinance is not the magical solution to take people out of poverty; it is merely a tool that the poor can use to raise their prospects for an escape from poverty.

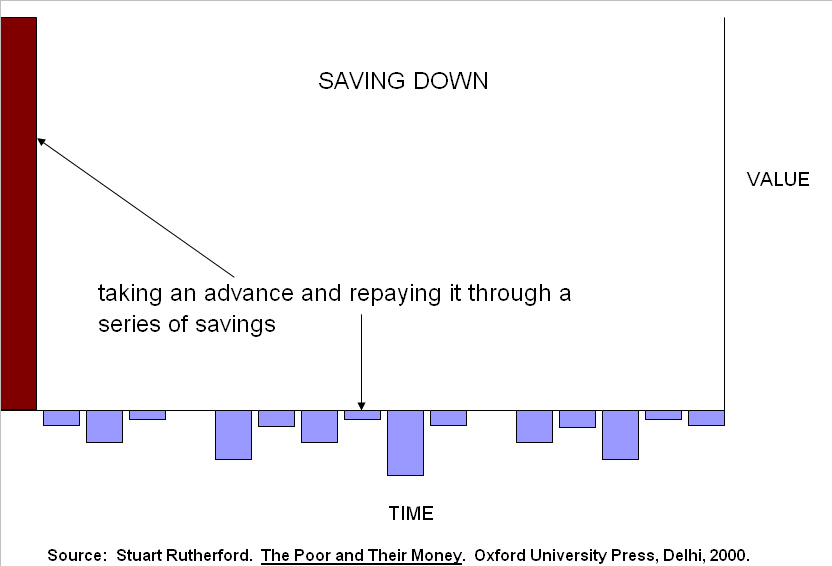
Saving down

Most needs are met through a mix of saving and credit. A benchmark impact assessment of Grameen Bank and two other large microfinance institutions in Bangladesh found that for every $1 they were lending to clients to finance rural non-farm micro-enterprise, about $2.50 came from other sources, mostly their clients' savings. This parallels the experience in the West, in which family businesses are funded mostly from savings, especially during start-up.

Recent studies have also shown that informal methods of saving are unsafe. For example, a study by Wright and Mutesasira in Uganda concluded that "those with no option but to save in the informal sector are almost bound to lose some money—probably around one quarter of what they save there".

The work of Rutherford, Wright and others has caused practitioners to reconsider a key aspect of the microcredit paradigm: that poor people get out of poverty by borrowing, building microenterprises and increasing their income. The new paradigm places more attention on the efforts of poor people to reduce their many vulnerabilities by keeping more of what they earn and building up their assets.

== Examples ==
The microfinance project of "saving up" is exemplified in the slums of the south-eastern city of Vijayawada, India. This microfinance project functions as an unofficial banking system where Jyothi, a "deposit collector", collects money from slum dwellers, mostly women, in order for them to accumulate savings. Jyothi does her rounds throughout the city, collecting Rs5 a day from people in the slums for 220 days, however not always 220 days in a row since these women do not always have the funds available to put them into savings. They ultimately end up with Rs1000 at the end of the process. However, there are some issues with this microfinance saving program. One of the issues is that while saving, clients are actually losing part of their savings. Jyothi takes interest from each client—about 20 out of every 220 payments, or Rs100 out of 1,100 or 9%. When these slum dwellers find someone they trust, they are willing to pay up to 30% to someone to safely collect and keep their savings. There is also the risk of entrusting their savings to unlicensed, informal, peripatetic collectors. However, the slum dwellers are willing to accept this risk because they are unable to save at home, and unable to use the banks in the country because of illiteracy. This microfinance project also has many benefits, such as empowering women and giving parents the ability to save money for their children's education. This specific microfinance project is an example of the benefits and limitations of the "saving up" project.

The microfinance project of "saving through" is shown in Nairobi, Kenya which includes a Rotating Savings and Credit Associations or ROSCAs initiative. This is a small scale example, however Rutherford (2009) describes a woman he met in Nairobi and studied her ROSCA. Every day 15 women would save 100 shillings so there would be a lump sum of 1,500 shillings and every day 1 of the 15 women would receive that lump sum. This would continue for 15 days and another woman within this group would receive the lump sum. At the end of the 15 days a new cycle would start. This ROSCA initiative is different from the "saving up" example above because there are no interest rates affiliated with the ROSCA, additionally everyone receives back what they put forth. This initiative requires trust and social capital networks in order to work, so often these ROSCAs include people who know each other and have reciprocity. The ROSCA allows for marginalized groups to receive a lump sum at one time in order to pay or save for specific needs they have.

== Debates and challenges ==
There are several key debates at the boundaries of microfinance.

=== Loan pricing ===
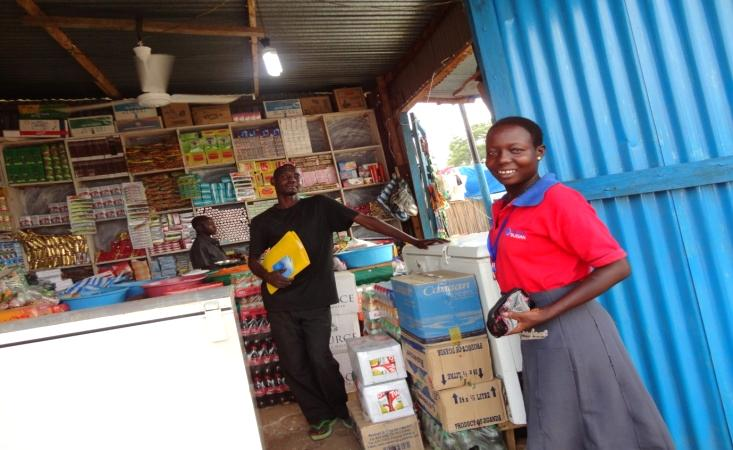
This shop in South Sudan was opened using money borrowed from the Finance Sudan Limited (FSL) Program. This program was established in 2006 as one of the only microfinance lenders in the country.

One of the principal challenges of microfinance is providing small loans at an affordable cost. The global average interest and fee rate is estimated at 37%, with rates reaching as high as 70% in some markets. The reason for the high interest rates is not primarily cost of capital. Indeed, the local microfinance organizations that receive zero-interest loan capital from the online microlending platform Kiva charge average interest and fee rates of 35.21%. Rather, the main reason for the high cost of microfinance loans is the high transaction cost of traditional microfinance operations relative to loan size.

Microfinance practitioners have long argued that such high interest rates are simply unavoidable, because the cost of making each loan cannot be reduced below a certain level while still allowing the lender to cover costs such as offices and staff salaries. For example, in Sub-Saharan Africa credit risk for microfinance institutes is very high, because customers need years to improve their livelihood and face many challenges during this time. Financial institutes often do not even have a system to check the person's identity. Additionally, they are unable to design new products and enlarge their business to reduce the risk. The result is that the traditional approach to microfinance has made only limited progress in resolving the problem it purports to address: that the world's poorest people pay the world's highest cost for small business growth capital. The high costs of traditional microfinance loans limit their effectiveness as a poverty-fighting tool. Offering loans at interest and fee rates of 37% mean that borrowers who do not manage to earn at least a 37% rate of return may actually end up poorer as a result of accepting the loans.

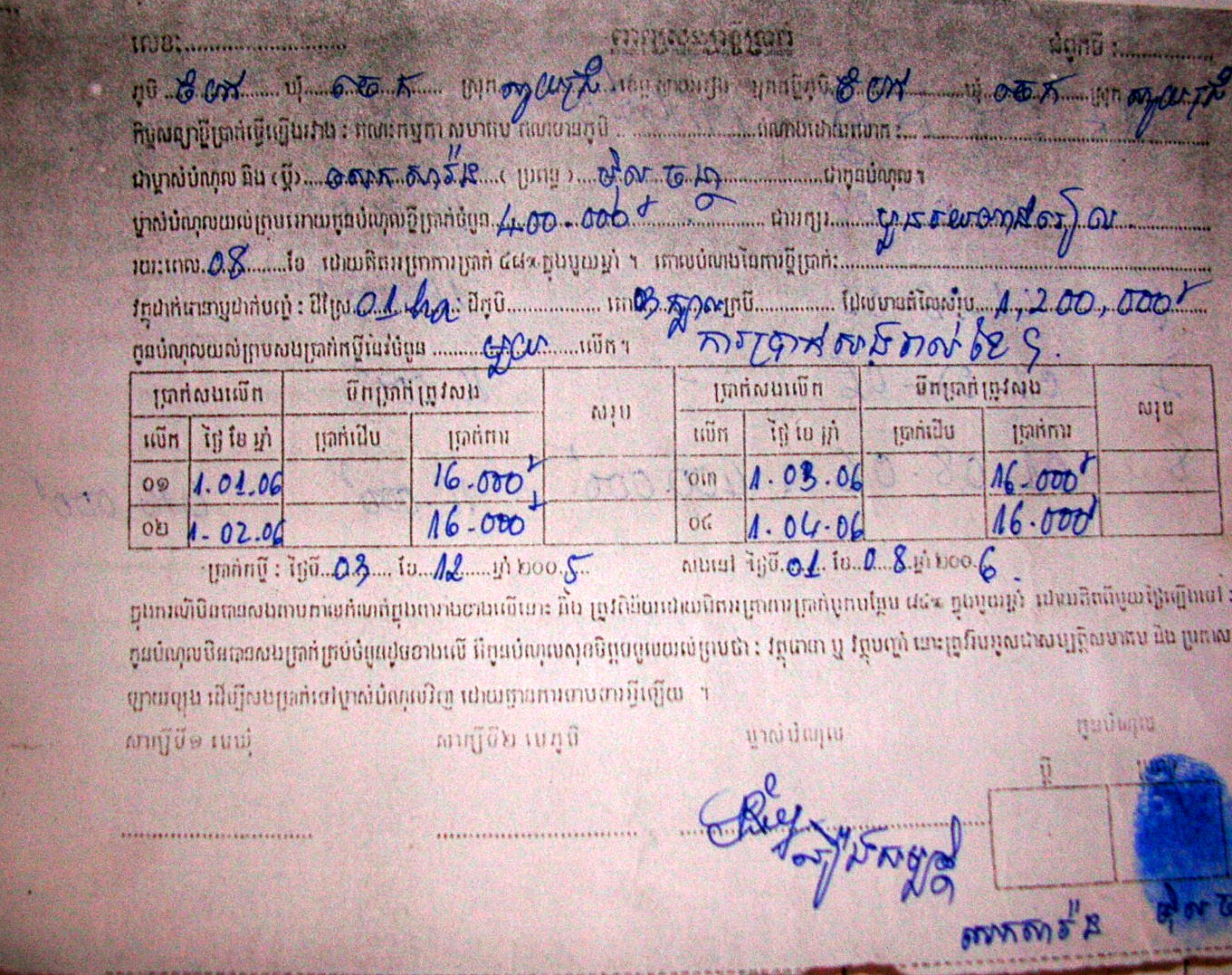
Example of a loan contract, using flat rate calculation, from rural Cambodia. Loan is for 400,000 riels at 4% flat (16,000 riels) interest per month.

According to a recent survey of microfinance borrowers in Ghana published by the Center for Financial Inclusion, more than one-third of borrowers surveyed reported struggling to repay their loans. Some resorted to measures such as reducing their food intake or taking children out of school in order to repay microfinance debts that had not proven sufficiently profitable.

In recent years, the microfinance industry has shifted its focus from the objective of increasing the volume of lending capital available, to address the challenge of providing microfinance loans more affordably. Microfinance analyst David Roodman contends that, in mature markets, the average interest and fee rates charged by microfinance institutions tend to fall over time. However, global average interest rates for microfinance loans are still well above 30%.

The answer to providing microfinance services at an affordable cost may lie in rethinking one of the fundamental assumptions underlying microfinance: that microfinance borrowers need extensive monitoring and interaction with loan officers in order to benefit from and repay their loans. The P2P microlending service Zidisha is based on this premise, facilitating direct interaction between individual lenders and borrowers via an internet community rather than physical offices. Zidisha has managed to bring the cost of microloans to below 10% for borrowers, including interest which is paid out to lenders. However, it remains to be seen whether such radical alternative models can reach the scale necessary to compete with traditional microfinance programs.

== Digital microfinance ==
The rise of mobile money and digital financial services has significantly expanded the reach of microfinance in emerging markets. According to the World Bank's Global Findex Database 2025, 58.2% of adults in sub-Saharan Africa now hold an account with a bank, mobile money provider, or similar financial institution — up from 49.3% in 2021 and more than double the 23.3% recorded in 2011 — with mobile money driving the majority of that growth.

The International Monetary Fund's 2025 Financial Access Survey found that digital transactions in emerging and developing economies rose from 55 per adult in 2017 to 251 per adult by 2024, with Sub-Saharan Africa leading growth in mobile money adoption. In Sub-Saharan Africa, fintech lending targeting micro and small enterprises rose from 13% to 88% of overall fintech funding between 2020 and 2023, according to the IMF citing data from CGAP. AI-powered credit scoring has further extended microfinance access to previously unbanked populations; in Ethiopia, more than 380,000 micro and small enterprises accessed USD 150 million through uncollateralised AI-driven credit facilities, according to the OECD's Africa Capital Markets Report 2025.

=== Use of loans ===
Practitioners and donors from the charitable side of microfinance frequently argue for restricting microcredit to loans for productive purposes—such as to start or expand a microenterprise. Those from the private-sector side respond that, because money is fungible, such a restriction is impossible to enforce, and that in any case it should not be up to rich people to determine how poor people use their money.

=== Reach versus depth of impact ===
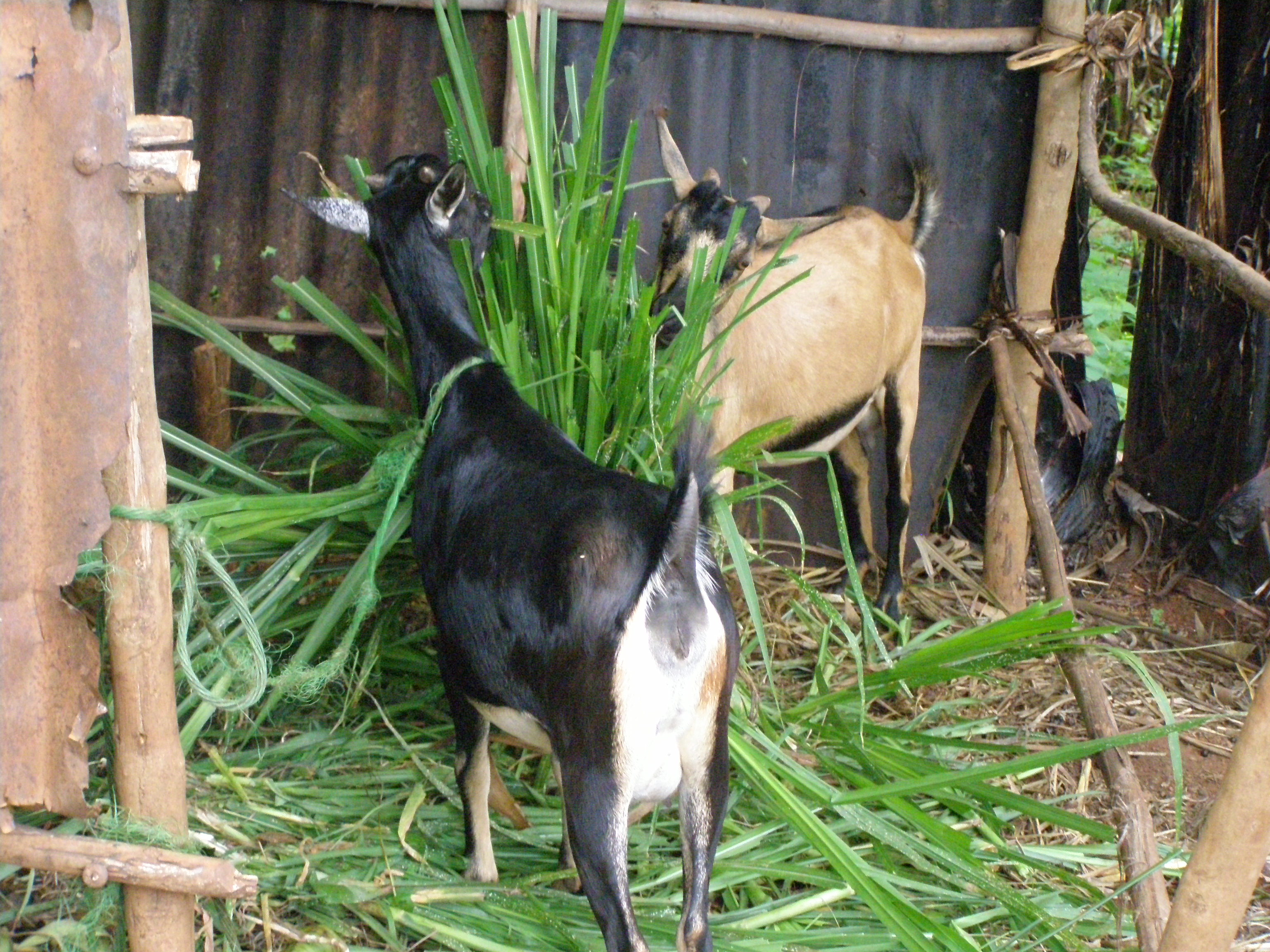
These goats are being raised by Rwandan women as part of a farm cooperative funded by microfinance.

There has been a long-standing debate over the sharpness of the trade-off between 'outreach' (the ability of a microfinance institution to reach poorer and more remote people) and its 'sustainability' (its ability to cover its operating costs—and possibly also its costs of serving new clients—from its operating revenues). Although it is generally agreed that microfinance practitioners should seek to balance these goals to some extent, there are a wide variety of strategies, ranging from the minimalist profit-orientation of BancoSol in Bolivia to the highly integrated not-for-profit orientation of BRAC in Bangladesh. This is true not only for individual institutions, but also for governments engaged in developing national microfinance systems. BRAC was ranked the number one NGO in the world in 2015 and 2016 by the Geneva-based NGO Advisor.

=== Women ===
Microfinance provides women around the world with financial and non-financial services, especially in the most rural areas that do not have access to traditional banking and other basic financial infrastructure. It creates opportunities for women to start-up and build their businesses using their own skills and talents.

Utilizing savings, credit, and microinsurance, Microfinance helps families create income-generating activities and better cope with risk. Women particularly benefit from microfinance as many microfinance institutions (MFIs) target female clients. Most microfinance institutions (MFIs) partner with other organizations like Water.org and Habitat for Humanity to provide additional services for their clients.

Microfinance generally agree that women should be the primary focus of service delivery. Evidence shows that they are less likely to default on their loans than men. Industry data from 2006 for 704 MFIs reaching 52 million borrowers includes MFIs using the solidarity lending methodology (99.3% female clients) and MFIs using individual lending (51% female clients). The delinquency rate for solidarity lending was 0.9% after 30 days (individual lending—3.1%), while 0.3% of loans were written off (individual lending—0.9%). Because operating margins become tighter the smaller the loans delivered, many MFIs consider the risk of lending to men to be too high. This focus on women is questioned sometimes, however a recent study of microentrepreneurs from Sri Lanka published by the World Bank found that the return on capital for male-owned businesses (half of the sample) averaged 11%, whereas the return for women-owned businesses was 0% or slightly negative.

Microfinance's emphasis on female-oriented lending is the subject of controversy, as it is claimed that microfinance improves the status of women through an alleviation of poverty. It is argued that by providing women with initial capital, they will be able to support themselves independent of men, in a manner which would encourage sustainable growth of enterprise and eventual self-sufficiency. This claim has yet to be proven in any substantial form. Moreover, the attraction of women as a potential investment base is precisely because they are constrained by socio-cultural norms regarding such concepts of obedience, familial duty, household maintenance and passivity. The result of these norms is that while micro-lending may enable women to improve their daily subsistence to a more steady pace, they will not be able to engage in market-oriented business practice beyond a limited scope of low-skilled, low-earning, informal work. Part of this is a lack of permissivity in the society; part a reflection of the added burdens of household maintenance that women shoulder alone as a result of microfinancial empowerment; and part a lack of training and education surrounding gendered conceptions of economics. In particular, the shift in norms such that women continue to be responsible for all the domestic private sphere labour as well as undertaking public economic support for their families, independent of male aid increases rather than decreases burdens on already limited persons.

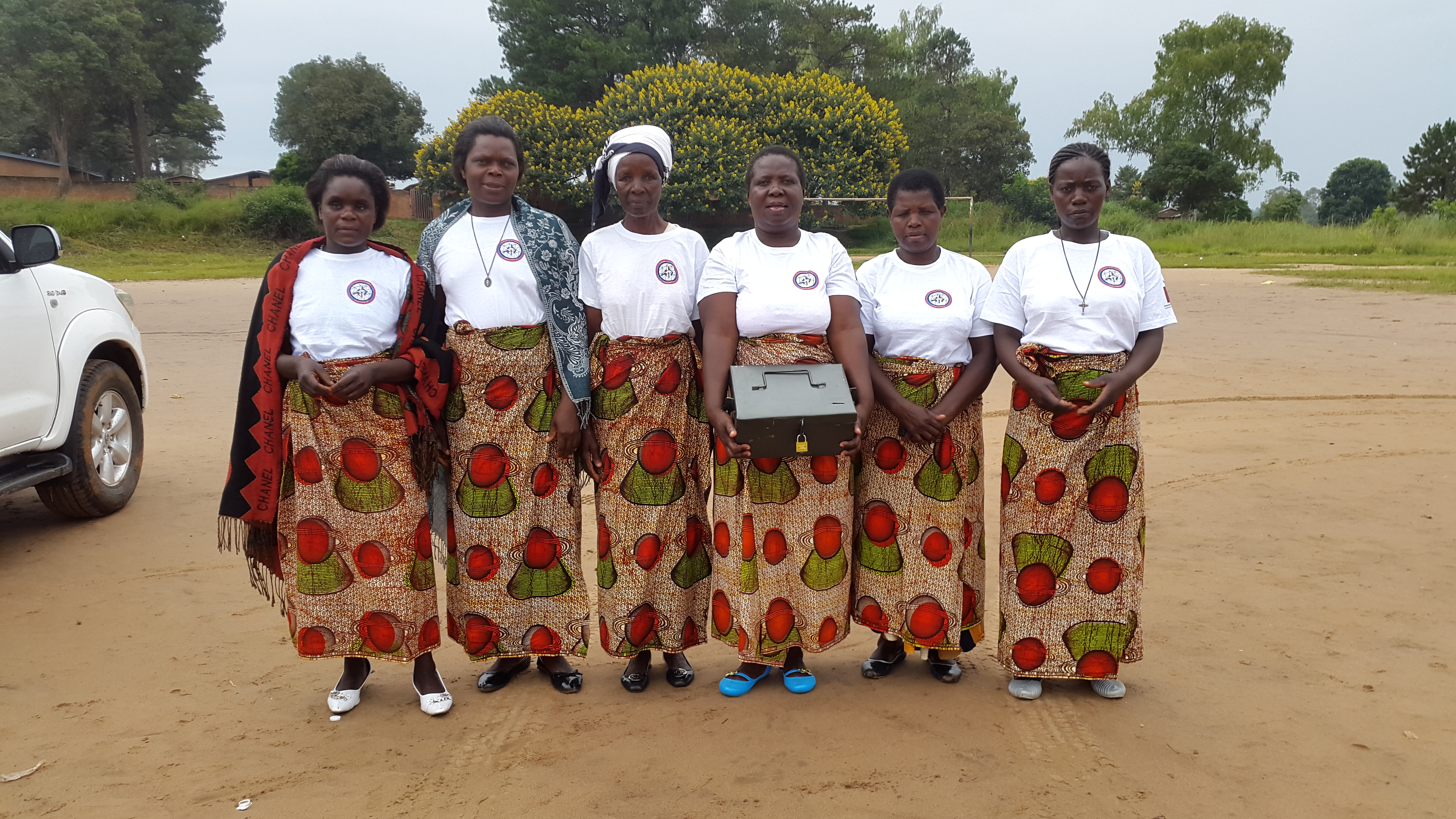
Women of Malawi posing with their savings box

If there were to be an exchange of labour, or if women's income were supplemental rather than essential to household maintenance, there might be some truth to claims of establishing long-term businesses; however when so constrained it is impossible for women to do more than pay off a current loan only to take on another in a cyclic pattern which is beneficial to the financier but hardly to the borrower. This gender essentializing crosses over from institutionalized lenders such as the Grameen Bank into interpersonal direct lending through charitable crowd-funding operations, such as Kiva. More recently, the popularity of non-profit global online lending has grown, suggesting that a redress of gender norms might be instituted through individual selection fomented by the processes of such programs, but the reality is as yet uncertain. Studies have noted that the likelihood of lending to women, individually or in groups, is 38% higher than rates of lending to men.

This is also due to a general trend for interpersonal microfinance relations to be conducted on grounds of similarity and internal/external recognition: lenders want to see something familiar, something supportable in potential borrowers, so an emphasis on family, goals of education and health, and a commitment to community all achieve positive results from prospective financiers.

==== Organizations supporting this work ====
- ADA
- Khushhali Microfinance Bank Limited Pakistan
- FINCA
- NWTF
- Akhuwat Foundation Pakistan
- Alkhidmat Foundation Pakistan
- Whole Planet Foundation
- Kiva
- MCPI
- Women's World Banking
- Social aid for Common Humanitarian - SACH

=== Benefits and limitations ===
One of the benefits of microfinancing for poverty stricken and low-income households is that it is accessible. Banks today will not extend loans to those with little to no assets, and generally do not engage in small size loans typically associated with microfinancing. Microfinancing is based on the philosophy that even small amounts of credit can help end the cycle of poverty. Another benefit produced from the microfinancing initiative is that it presents opportunities, such as extending education and jobs. Families receiving microfinancing are less likely to pull their children out of school for economic reasons. As well, in relation to employment, people are more likely to open small businesses that will aid the creation of new jobs. Overall, the benefits outline that the microfinancing initiative is set out to improve the standard of living amongst impoverished communities.

There are also many social and financial challenges for microfinance initiatives. For example, more articulate and better-off community members may cheat poorer or less-educated neighbours. This may occur intentionally or inadvertently through loosely run organizations. As a result, many microfinance initiatives require a large amount of social capital or trust in order to work effectively. The ability of poorer people to save may also fluctuate over time as unexpected costs may take priority which could result in them being able to save little or nothing some weeks. Rates of inflation may cause funds to lose their value, thus financially harming the saver and not benefiting the collector.

While the success of the Grameen Bank (which now serves over 7 million poor Bangladeshi women) has inspired the world, it has proved difficult to replicate this success. In nations with lower population densities, meeting the operating costs of a retail branch by serving nearby customers has proven considerably more challenging. Hans Dieter Seibel, board member of the European Microfinance Platform, is in favour of the group model. This particular model (used by many Microfinance institutions) makes financial sense, he says, because it reduces transaction costs. Microfinance programmes also need to be based on local funds.

== Standards and principles ==
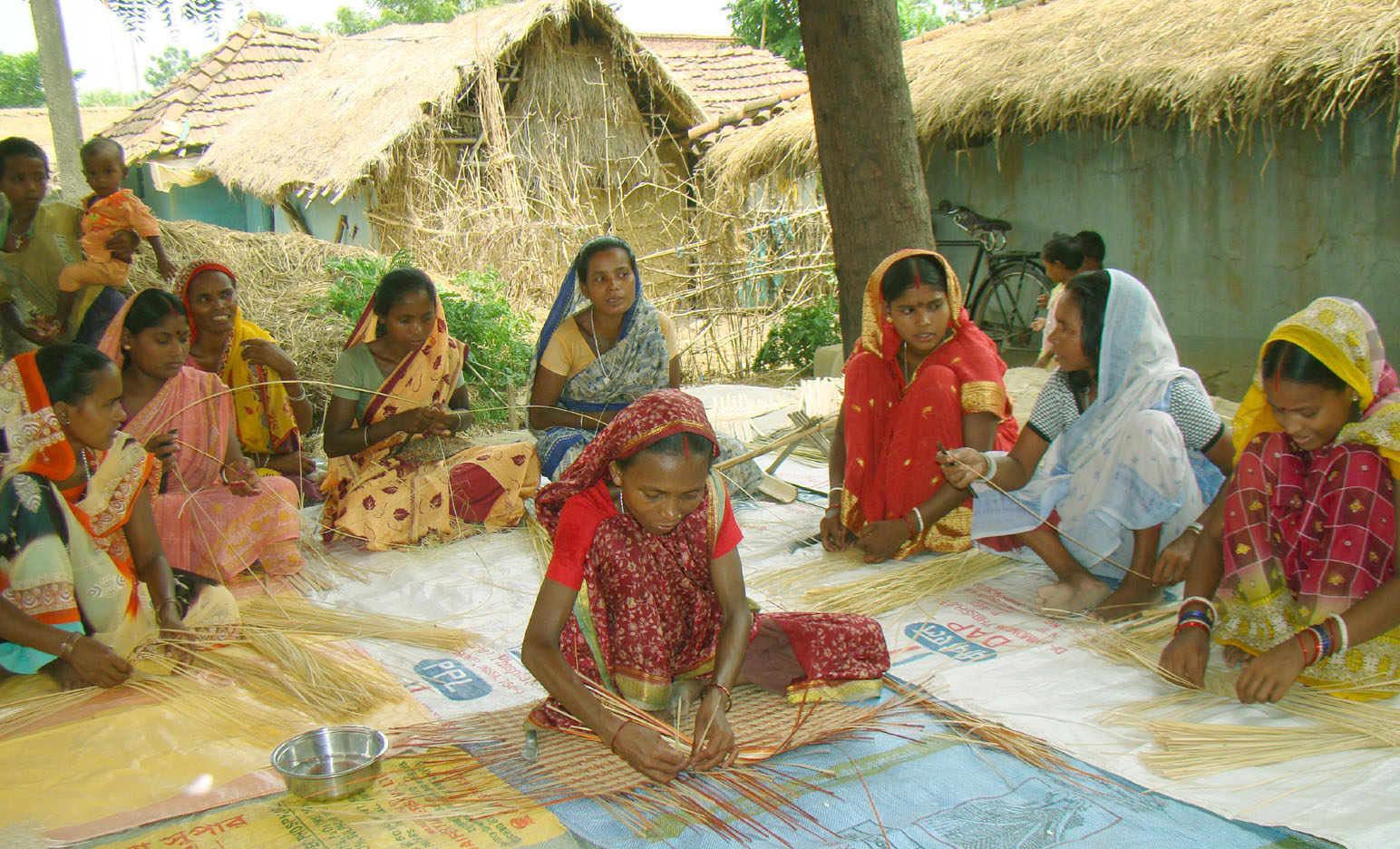
A group of Indian women have assembled to make bamboo products that they intend to resell.

Poor people borrow from informal moneylenders and save with informal collectors. They receive loans and grants from charities. They buy insurance from state-owned companies. They receive funds transfers through formal or informal remittance networks. It is not easy to distinguish microfinance from similar activities. It could be claimed that a government that orders state banks to open deposit accounts for poor consumers, or a moneylender that engages in usury, or a charity that runs a heifer pool are engaged in microfinance. Ensuring financial services to poor people is best done by expanding the number of financial institutions available to them, as well as by strengthening the capacity of those institutions. In recent years there has also been increasing emphasis on expanding the diversity of institutions, since different institutions serve different needs.

Some principles that summarize a century and a half of development practice were encapsulated in 2004 by CGAP and endorsed by the Group of Eight leaders at the G8 Summit on 10 June 2004:

1. Poor people need not just loans but also savings, insurance and money transfer services.
2. Microfinance must be useful to poor households: helping them raise income, build up assets and/or cushion themselves against external shocks.
3. "Microfinance can pay for itself." Subsidies from donors and government are scarce and uncertain and so, to reach large numbers of poor people, microfinance must pay for itself.
4. Microfinance means building permanent local institutions.
5. Microfinance also means integrating the financial needs of poor people into a country's mainstream financial system.
6. "The job of government is to enable financial services, not to provide them."
7. "Donor funds should complement private capital, not compete with it."
8. "The key bottleneck is the shortage of strong institutions and managers." Donors should focus on capacity building.
9. Interest rate ceilings hurt poor people by preventing microfinance institutions from covering their costs, which chokes off the supply of credit.
10. Microfinance institutions should measure and disclose their performance – both financially and socially.

Microfinance is considered a tool for socio-economic development, and can be clearly distinguished from charity. Families who are destitute, or so poor they are unlikely to be able to generate the cash flow required to repay a loan, should be recipients of charity. Others are best served by financial institutions.

== Scale of operations ==
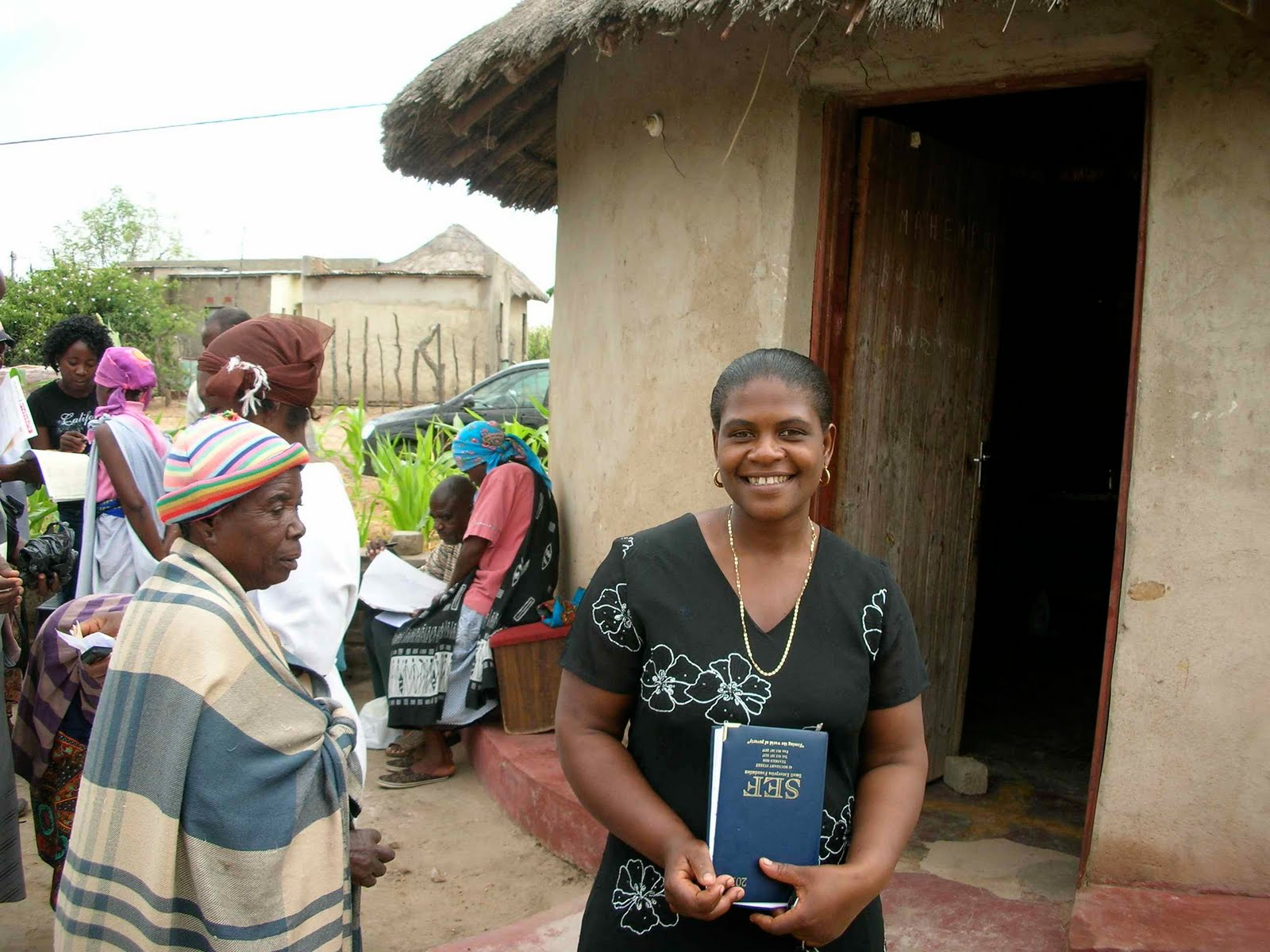
Two women talk about financial matters. The woman on the right is a loan officer for the Small Enterprise Foundation (SEF). The conversation shown is taking place in Tzaneen, South Africa in February 2010.

No systematic effort to map the distribution of microfinance has yet been undertaken. A benchmark was established by an analysis of 'alternative financial institutions' in the developing world in 2004. The authors counted approximately 665 million client accounts at over 3,000 institutions that are serving people who are poorer than those served by the commercial banks. Of these accounts, 120 million were with institutions normally understood to practice microfinance. Reflecting the diverse historical roots of the movement, however, they also included postal savings banks (318 million accounts), state agricultural and development banks (172 million accounts), financial cooperatives and credit unions (35 million accounts) and specialized rural banks (19 million accounts).

Regionally, the highest concentration of these accounts was in India (188 million accounts representing 18% of the total national population). The lowest concentrations were in Latin America and the Caribbean (14 million accounts representing 3% of the total population) and Africa (27 million accounts representing 4% of the total population, with the highest rate of penetration in West Africa, and the highest growth rate in Eastern and Southern Africa ). Considering that most bank clients in the developed world need several active accounts to keep their affairs in order, these figures indicate that the task the microfinance movement has set for itself is still very far from finished.

By type of service, "savings accounts in alternative finance institutions outnumber loans by about four to one. This is a worldwide pattern that does not vary much by region."

An important source of detailed data on selected microfinance institutions is the MicroBanking Bulletin, which is published by Microfinance Information Exchange. At the end of 2009, it was tracking 1,084 MFIs that were serving 74 million borrowers ($38 billion in outstanding loans) and 67 million savers ($23 billion in deposits).

Another source of information regarding the environment of microfinance is the Global Microscope on the Microfinance Business Environment, prepared by the Economist Intelligence Unit (EIU), the Inter-American Development Bank, and others. The 2011 report contains information on the environment of microfinance in 55 countries among two categories, the regulatory framework and the supporting institutional framework. This publication, also known as the Microscope, was first developed in 2007, focusing only on Latin America and the Caribbean, but by 2009, this report had become a global study.

As yet there are no studies that indicate the scale or distribution of 'informal' microfinance organizations like ROSCA's and informal associations that help people manage costs like weddings, funerals and sickness. Numerous case studies have been published, however, indicating that these organizations, which are generally designed and managed by poor people themselves with little outside help, operate in most countries in the developing world.

Help can come in the form of more and better-qualified staff; thus, higher education is needed for microfinance institutions. This has begun in some universities, as Oliver Schmidt describes.

== Ecosystem ==
In recent years, there have been calls for better understanding of the ecosystem of microfinance. The practitioners and researchers felt that it was important to understand the ecosystem in which microfinance institutions operated in order for the market system actors and facilitators to understand what they have to do to achieve their objectives of participating in the ecosystem. Professors Debapratim Purkayastha, Trilochan Tripathy and Biswajit Das have designed a model for the ecosystem of microfinance institutions (MFIs) in India. The researchers mapped the ecosystem and found the ecosystem to be very complicated, with complex interactions among numerous actors themselves, and their environment. This ecosystem framework can be used by MFIs to understand the ecosystem of microfinance and formulate strategy. It can also help other stakeholders such as donors, investors, banks, government, etc. to formulate their own strategies relating to this sector.

== In the United States and Canada ==
In Canada and the US, microfinance organizations target marginalized populations unable to access mainstream bank financing. Close to 8% of Americans are unbanked, meaning around 9 million are without any kind of bank account or formal financial services. Most of these institutions are structured as nonprofit organizations. Microloans in the U.S. context is defined as the extension of credit up to $50,000. In Canada, CRA guidelines restrict microfinance loans to a maximum of $25,000. The average microfinance loan size in the US is US$9,732, ten times the size of an average microfinance loan in developing countries (US$973).

=== Impact ===
While all microfinance institutions aim at increasing incomes and employment, in developing countries the empowerment of women, improved nutrition and improved education of the borrower's children are frequently aims of microfinance institutions. In the US and Canada, aims of microfinance include the graduation of recipients from welfare programs and an improvement in their credit rating. In the US, microfinance has created jobs directly and indirectly, as 60% of borrowers were able to hire others. According to reports, every domestic microfinance loan creates 2.4 jobs. These entrepreneurs provide wages that are, on average, 25% higher than minimum wage. Small business loans eventually allow small business owners to make their businesses their primary source of income, with 67% of the borrowers showing a significant increase in their income as a result of their participation in certain micro-loan programs. In addition, these business owners are able to improve their housing situation, 70% indicating their housing has improved. Ultimately, many of the small business owners that use social funding are able to graduate from government funding.

=== United States ===
In the late 1980s, microfinance institutions developed in the United States. They served low-income and marginalized minority communities. By 2007, there were 500 microfinance organizations operating in the US with 200 lending capital.

There were three key factors that triggered the growth in domestic microfinance:

1. Change in social welfare policies and focus on economic development and job creation at the macro level.
2. Encouragement of employment, including self-employment, as a strategy for improving the lives of the poor.
3. The increase in the proportion of Latin American and Asian immigrants who came from societies where microenterprises are prevalent.

These factors incentivized the public and private supports to have microlending activity in the United States.

=== Canada ===
Microfinance in Canada took shape through the development of credit unions. These credit unions provided financial services to the Canadians who could not get access to traditional financial means. Two separate branches of credit unions developed in Canada to serve the financially marginalized segment of the population. Alphonse Desjardins introduced the establishment of savings and credit services in late 1900 to the Quebecois who did not have financial access. Approximately 30 years later Father Moses Coady introduced credit unions to Nova Scotia. These were the models of the modern institutions still present in Canada today.

Efforts to transfer specific microfinance innovations such as solidarity lending from developing countries to Canada have met with little success.

Selected microfinance institutions in Canada are:

- Rise Asset Development

Founded by Sandra Rotman in 2009, Rise is a Rotman and CAMH initiative that provides small business loans, leases, and lines of credit to entrepreneurs with mental health and addiction challenges.

- Alterna Savings

Formed in 2005 through the merging of the Civil Service Savings and Loan Society and the Metro Credit Union, Alterna is a financial alternative to Canadians. Their banking policy is based on cooperative values and expert financial advising.

- Access Community Capital Fund

Based in Toronto, Ontario, ACCESS is a Canadian charity that helps entrepreneurs without collateral or credit history find affordable small loans.

- Montreal Community Loan Fund

Created to help eradicate poverty, Montreal Community Loan Fund provides accessible credit and technical support to entrepreneurs with low income or credit for start-ups or expansion of organizations that cannot access traditional forms of credit.

- Momentum

Using the community economic development approach, Momentum offers opportunities to people living in poverty in Calgary. Momentum provides individuals and families who want to better their financial situation take control of finances, become computer literate, secure employment, borrow and repay loans for business, and purchase homes.

- Vancity

Founded in 1946, Vancity is now the largest English speaking credit union in Canada.

==== Limitations ====
Complications specific to Canada include the need for loans of a substantial size in comparison to the ones typically seen in many international microfinance initiatives. Microfinance is also limited by the rules and limitations surrounding money-lending. For example, Canada Revenue Agency limits the loans made in these sorts of transactions to a maximum of $25,000. As a result, many people look to banks to provide these loans. Also, microfinance in Canada is driven by profit which, as a result, fails to advance the social development of community members. Within marginalized or impoverished Canadian communities, banks may not be readily accessible to deposit or take out funds. These banks which would have charged little or no interest on small amounts of cash are replaced by lending companies. Here, these companies may charge extremely large interest rates to marginalized community members thus increasing the cycle of poverty and profiting off of another's loss.

In Canada, microfinancing competes with pay-day loans institutions which take advantage of marginalized and low-income individuals by charging extremely high, predatory interest rates. Communities with low social capital often do not have the networks to implement and support microfinance initiatives, leading to the proliferation of pay day loan institutions. Pay day loan companies are unlike traditional microfinance in that they don't encourage collectivism and social capital building in low income communities, however exist solely for profit.

== Networks and associations ==
There are several professional networks of microfinance institutions, and organisations that support microfinance and financial inclusion.

=== MicroFinance Network ===
The Microfinance Network is a network of 20 to 25 of the world's largest microfinance institutions, spread across Asia, Africa, the Middle East, Europe and Latin America. Established in 1993, the Microfinance Network provided support to members that helped steer many industry leaders to sustainability, and profitability in many of their largest markets. Today as the sector enters a new period of transition, with the rise of digital financial technology that increasingly competes with traditional microfinance institutions, the Microfinance Network provides a space to discuss opportunities and challenges that arise from emerging technological innovations in inclusive finance. The Microfinance Network convenes once a year. Members include Al Majmoua, BRAC, BancoSol, Gentera, Kamurj, LAPO, and SOGESOL. Microfinance services including Easy Paisa by Telenor and Temeer Microfinance Bank, Jazz Cash by Jazz Telecom, and Zindigi have all been introduced by various telecom companies in Pakistan. These services provide lending services, retailer services, and online money transfer capabilities.

=== Partnership for Responsible Financial Inclusion ===
The Partnership for Responsible Financial, previously known as the Microfinance CEO Working Group, is a collaborative effort of leading international organizations and their CEOs active in the microfinance and inclusive finance space, including direct microfinance practitioners, and microfinance funders. It consists of 10 members, including Accion, Aga Khan Agency for Microfinance, BRAC, CARE USA, FINCA Impact Finance, Grameen Foundation, Opportunity International, Pro Mujer, Vision Fund International and Women's World Banking. Harnessing the power of the CEOs and their senior managers, the PRFI advocates for responsible financial services and seeks catalytic opportunities to accelerate financial access to the unserved. As part of this focus, PRFI is responsible for setting up the Smart Campaign, in response to negative microfinance practices that indicated the mistreatment of clients in certain markets. The network is made up of the CEO working group, that meet quarterly and several subcommittee working groups dedicated to communications, social performance, digital financial services, and legal and human resources issues.

=== European Microfinance Network ===
The European Microfinance Network (EMN) was established in response to many legal and political obstacles affecting the microfinance sector in Europe. The Network is involved in advocacy on a wide range of issues related to microfinance, micro-enterprises, social and financial exclusion, self-employment and employment creation. Its main activity is the organisation of its annual conference, which has taken place each year since 2004. The EMN has a network of over 100 members.

=== Microfinance Centre ===
The Microfinance Centre (MFC) has a membership of over 100 organisations, and is particularly strong in Eastern Europe, the Balkans and Central Asia.

=== Africa Microfinance Network (AFMIN) ===
The Africa Microfinance Network (AFMIN) is an association of microfinance networks in Africa resulting from an initiative led by African microfinance practitioners to create and strengthen country-level microfinance networks for the purpose of establishing shared performance standards, institutional capacity and policy change. AFMIN was formally launched in November 2000 and has established its secretariat in Abidjan (Republic of Côte d'Ivoire), where AFMIN is legally recognized as an international Non-Governmental Organisation pursuant to Ivorian laws. Because of the political unrest in Côte d'Ivoire, AFMIN temporarily relocated its office to Cotonou in Benin.

== Inclusive financial systems ==
The microcredit movement that began in the 1970s has emerged and morphed into a 'financial systems' approach for creating universal financial inclusion. While the Grameen model of delivering small credit achieved a great deal, especially in urban and near-urban areas and with entrepreneurial families, its progress in delivering financial services in less densely populated rural areas was slow, creating the need for many and multiple models to emerge across the globe. The terms have evolved from microcredit, to microfinance, and now financial inclusion. Specialized microfinance institutions (MFIs) continue to expand their services, collaborating and competing with banks, credit unions, mobile money, and other informal and formal member-owned institutions.

The new financial systems approach acknowledges the history of microfinance and the diversity of institutions serving low-income people in both developing and developed economies. It recognizes the varying financial service needs of the world's poorest populations and the different contexts in which they live and work. The quality and range of financial services are important for achieving broader financial inclusion. Central banks and mainstream banks are increasingly participating in financial inclusion initiatives, although approximately 35–40% of adults worldwide remain outside the formal banking system, and many more are under-banked. Mobile-phone-based money management and digital finance are changing financial access, although significant barriers remain between economically disadvantaged populations and the banking system.

Informal financial service providers
These include moneylenders, pawnbrokers, savings collectors, money-guards, ROSCAs, ASCAs and input supply shops. These continue their services because they know each other well and live in the same community, they understand each other's financial circumstances and can offer very flexible, convenient and fast services. These services can also be costly and the choice of financial products limited and very short-term. Informal services that involve savings are also risky; many people lose their money.
Member-owned organizations
These include self-help groups, Village Savings and Loan Associations (VSLAs), credit unions, CVECAs and a variety of other members owned and governed informal or formal financial institutions. Informal groups, like their more traditional cousins, are generally small and local, which means they have access to good knowledge about each other's financial circumstances and can offer convenience and flexibility. Since they are managed by poor people, their costs of operation are low. Often, they do not need regulation and supervision, unless they grow in scale and formalize themselves by coming together to form II or III tier federations. If not prepared well, they can be 'captured' by a few influential leaders, and run the risk of members losing their savings. Experience suggests though that these informal but highly disciplined groups are very sustainable, and continue to exist even after 20–25 years. Formalization, as a Cooperative of Credit Union, can help create links with the banking system for more sophisticated financial products and additional capital for loans; but requires strong leadership and systems. These models are highly popular in many rural regions of countries across Asia, Africa, and Latin America; and a platform for creating deeper financial inclusion.
NGOs
The Microcredit Summit Campaign counted 3,316 of these MFIs and NGOs lending to about 133 million clients by the end of 2006. Led by Grameen Bank and BRAC in Bangladesh, Prodem in Bolivia, Opportunity International, and FINCA International, headquartered in Washington, DC, these NGOs have spread around the developing world in the past three decades; others, like the Gamelan Council, address larger regions. They have used proven banking techniques like solidarity lending, village banking and mobile banking to overcome barriers to serving poor populations. However, with boards that do not necessarily represent either their capital or their customers, their governance structures can be fragile, and they can become overly dependent on external donors.
Formal financial institutions
In addition to commercial banks, these include state banks, agricultural development banks, savings banks, rural banks and non-bank financial institutions. They are regulated and supervised, offer a wider range of financial services, and control a branch network that can extend across the country and internationally. However, they have proved reluctant to adopt social missions, and due to their high costs of operation, often cannot deliver services to poor or remote populations. The increasing use of alternative data in credit scoring, such as trade credit is increasing commercial banks' interest in microfinance.
Automated loans
Automated loans include point-of-sale loans offered by financial technology companies like Affirm, Klarna, Afterpay, and Quadpay. These "buy now, pay later" services are accelerating the automatization of the finance industry. Point-of-sale loans are embedded within retail websites to offer consumers the chance to take out a loan for the price of the product, and pay them back in installments. These "buy now, pay later" lenders either make money by having high late fees or a high interest rate, often higher than the average APR of a credit card. When applying for a loan, these companies data profile by recording the customer's history in making payments on time, social media history, income level, education, and previous purchases. Regardless of whether or not the consumer accepts the terms of the loan, these fintech companies have access to this information. Many of them have stated that they sell the information back to the merchant.
These services are often targeting marginalized groups such as low-income people as 60% of users are 18–34 years old and 40% earn under $40,000. As a result, they are trapping young consumers into a cycle of debt by ease of taking out a loan. This reinforces risky consumer habits and results in 1 out of 6 borrowers defaulting on their payments to these point of sale lenders. Moreover, the companies benefit at the expense of the consumer, so they make it seem harmless while advertising. Yet, it may hurt the consumers' credit by reporting to a credit bureau, trap them with debt, and give the merchant access to the consumer data profile. This creates a "feedback loop of injustice."
Many vulnerable consumers come from low-income backgrounds and do not understand misleading practices, given their lack of digital literacy skills. When investigating these inequalities through activities related to these issues, Gangadharan (2015) finds that "marginal users are exposed and vulnerable to various forms of profiling (e.g. committed by corporate, government, or bad actors) that target unwitting users for both intentionally and unintentionally harmful purposes." Additionally, filling out the fields on their application without submitting the form can still send the information to the server, thus giving the company access to the information typed. However, many marginalized users come to expect a lack of data privacy given that companies engage in data profiling tactics, calling it "the price of using the internet." Many feel that these marketplace and society see and target them as "second class citizens". In addition, a 2015 survey conducted by the Data & Society Research Institute studying technological experiences of 3,000 adults found that "52% of surveyed consumers from the lowest income group said they did not know what information is being collected about them or how it is being used."

With appropriate regulation and supervision, each of these institutional types can bring leverage to solving the microfinance problem. For example, efforts are being made to link self-help groups to commercial banks, to network member-owned organizations together to achieve economies of scale and scope, and to support efforts by commercial banks to 'down-scale' by integrating mobile banking and e-payment technologies into their extensive branch networks.

Brigit Helms, in her book Access for All: Building Inclusive Financial Systems, distinguishes between four general categories of microfinance providers, and argues for a pro-active strategy of engagement with all of them to help them achieve the goals of the microfinance movement.

== Microcredit and the Web ==
Due to the unbalanced emphasis on credit at the expense of microsavings, as well as a desire to link Western investors to the sector, peer-to-peer platforms have developed to expand the availability of microcredit through individual lenders in the developed world. New platforms that connect lenders to micro-entrepreneurs are emerging on the Web (peer-to-peer sponsors), for example MYC4, Kiva, Zidisha, myELEN, Opportunity International and the Microloan Foundation. Another Web-based microlender United Prosperity uses a variation on the usual microlending model; with United Prosperity the micro-lender provides a guarantee to a local bank which then lends back double that amount to the micro-entrepreneur. In 2009, the US-based nonprofit Zidisha became the first peer-to-peer microlending platform to link lenders and borrowers directly across international borders without local intermediaries.

The volume channeled through Kiva's peer-to-peer platform is about $100 million as of November 2009 (Kiva facilitates approximately $5M in loans each month). In comparison, the needs for microcredit are estimated about 250 bn USD as of end 2006. Most experts agree that these funds must be sourced locally in countries that are originating microcredit, to reduce transaction costs and exchange rate risks.

There have been problems with disclosure on peer-to-peer sites, with some reporting interest rates of borrowers using the flat rate methodology instead of the familiar banking Annual Percentage Rate. The use of flat rates, which has been outlawed among regulated financial institutions in developed countries, can confuse individual lenders into believing their borrower is paying a lower interest rate than, in fact, they are. In the summer of 2017, within the framework of the joint project of the Central Bank of Russia and Yandex, a special check mark (a green circle with a tick and Реестр ЦБ РФ 'State MFO Register' text box) appeared search results on the Yandex search engine, informing the consumer that the company's financial services are offered on the marked website, which has the status of a microfinance organization.

=== Blockchain micro-lending ===
Blockchain micro-lending refers to the use of open-source distributed ledger systems and smart contracts to issue and manage small loans without traditional financial intermediaries. The model is commonly discussed as part of decentralized finance (DeFi) or microcredit and is proposed as a way to reduce transaction costs, increase transparency, and expand access to credit in underserved communities and countries that are underbanked and unbanked.

== Social interventions ==
There are a few social interventions that have been combined with microfinancing to increase awareness of HIV/AIDS. Such interventions like the "Intervention with Microfinance for AIDS and Gender Equity" (IMAGE) which incorporates microfinancing with "The Sisters-for-Life" program a participatory program that educates on different gender roles, gender-based violence, and HIV/AIDS infections to strengthen the communication skills and leadership of women. "The Sisters-for-Life" program has two phases; phase one consists of ten one-hour training programs with a facilitator, and phase two consists of identifying a leader amongst the group, training them further, and allowing them to implement an action plan to their respective centres.

Microfinance has also been combined with business education and with other packages of health interventions. A project undertaken in Peru by Innovations for Poverty Action found that those borrowers randomly selected to receive financial training as part of their borrowing group meetings had higher profits, although there was not a reduction in "the proportion who reported having problems in their business". Pro Mujer, a non-governmental organisation (NGO) with operations in five Latin American countries, combines microfinance and healthcare. This approach shows that microfinance can not only help businesses to prosper; it can also foster human development and social security. Pro Mujer uses a "one-stop shop" approach, which means in one building, the clients find financial services, business training, empowerment advice and healthcare services combined.

According to technology analyst David Garrity, Microfinance and Mobile Financial Services (MFS) have provided marginal populations with access to basic financial services, including savings programs and insurance policies.

== Impact and criticism ==
Most criticisms of microfinance have actually been criticisms of microcredit. Criticism focuses on the impact on poverty, the level of interest rates, high profits, overindebtedness and suicides. Recent research indicates that while traditional microcredit alone rarely produces transformational income growth, the focus of microfinance has shifted toward tailored financial products, such as savings, digital payments, and flexible repayment or equity models, to better fit diverse borrower needs. Other criticism include the role of foreign donors and working conditions in companies affiliated to microfinance institutions, particularly in Bangladesh.

=== Impact ===
The impact of microcredit is a subject of much controversy. Proponents state that it reduces poverty through higher employment and higher incomes. This is expected to lead to improved nutrition and improved education of the borrowers' children. Some argue that microcredit empowers women. In the US and Canada, it is argued that microcredit helps recipients to graduate from welfare programs.

Critics say that microcredit has not increased incomes, but has driven poor households into a debt trap, in some cases even leading to suicide. They add that the money from loans is often used for durable consumer goods or consumption instead of being used for productive investments, that it fails to empower women, and that it has not improved health or education. Moreover, as the access to micro-loans is widespread, borrowers tend to acquire several loans from different companies, making it nearly impossible to pay the debt back. As a result of such tragic events, microfinance institutions in India have agreed on setting an interest rate ceiling of 15 percent. This is important because microfinance loan recipients have a higher level of security in repaying the loans and a lower level of risk in failing to repay them.

Unintended consequences of microfinance include informal intermediaton: That is, some entrepreneurial borrowers become informal intermediaries between microfinance initiatives and poorer micro-entrepreneurs. Those who more easily qualify for microfinance split loans into smaller credit to even poorer borrowers. Informal intermediation ranges from casual intermediaries at the good or benign end of the spectrum to 'loan sharks' at the professional and sometimes criminal end of the spectrum.

=== Competition and market saturation ===
Microcredit has also received criticism for inducing market saturation and fueling problematically competitive, rather than collaborative business communities. The influx of supply generated by the creation of new microcredit-fueled-businesses can be difficult for small economies to absorb. The owners of micro-enterprises within such communities often have limited skill sets and resources available. This can cause a "copycat" phenomenon among small business due to the limited variation in products and services offerings. The high number of individuals selling similar products and services can cause new entrepreneurs to be subject to cutthroat competition over a demand that has not expanded proportionally with the supply.

=== Mission drift ===
Mission drift refers to the phenomena through which the MFIs or the micro finance institutions increasingly try to cater to customers who are better off than their original customers, primarily the poor families. Roy Mersland and R. Øystein Strøm in their research on mission drift suggest that this selection bias can come not only through an increase in the average loan size, which allows for financially stronger individuals to get the loans, but also through the MFI's particular lending methodology, main market of operation, or even the gender bias as further mission drift measures. And as it may follow, this selective funding would lead to lower risks and lower costs for the firm.

However, economists Beatriz Armendáriz and Ariane Szafarz suggests that this phenomenon is not driven by cost minimization alone. She suggests that it happens because of the interplay between the company's mission, the cost differential between poor and unbanked wealthier clients and region specific characteristics pertaining the heterogeneity of their clientele. But in either way, this problem of selective funding leads to an ethical tradeoff where on one hand there is an economic reason for the company to restrict its loans to only the individuals who qualify the standards, and on the other hand there is an ethical responsibility to help the poor people get out of poverty through the provision of capital.

=== Role of foreign donors ===
The role of donors has also been questioned. CGAP recently commented that: "a large proportion of the money they spend is not effective, either because it gets hung up in unsuccessful and often complicated funding mechanisms (for example, a government apex facility), or it goes to partners that are not held accountable for performance. In some cases, poorly conceived programs have slowed the development of inclusive financial systems by distorting markets and displacing domestic commercial initiatives with cheap or free money."

=== Working conditions in enterprises affiliated to MFIs ===
There has also been criticism of microlenders for not taking more responsibility for the working conditions of poor households, particularly when borrowers become quasi-wage labourers, selling crafts or agricultural produce through an organization controlled by the MFI. The desire of MFIs to help their borrower diversify and increase their incomes has sparked this type of relationship in several countries, most notably BRAC. Critics maintain that there are few if any rules or standards in these cases governing working hours, holidays, working conditions, safety or child labour, and few inspection regimes to correct abuses. Some of these concerns have been taken up by unions and socially responsible investment advocates.

=== Abuse ===
In Nigeria cases of fraud have been reported. Dubious banks promised their clients outrageous interest rates. These banks were closed shortly after clients had deposited money and their deposits were lost. The officials of Nigeria Deposit Insurance Corporation (NDIC) have warned customers about so-called "wonder banks". One initiative to prevent people from depositing money to wonder banks is the mini-series "e go better" that warns about the practices of these wonder banks.

== See also ==
- Alternative data
- Chit fund
- Credit union
- Crowdfunding
- Market governance mechanisms
- Microcredit
- Microcredit for water supply and sanitation
- Microfinance in Tanzania
- Microfinance organizations
- Microgrant
- Microinsurance
- Pawnbroker
- Peer-to-peer lending
- Rotating savings and credit association (ROSCA)
- Savings bank
- Social finance
- WWB Colombia

== Sources ==
- Christen, Robert Peck; Rosenberg, Richard; Jayadeva, Veena (July 2004). Financial institutions with a 'double bottom line': implications for the future of microfinance (Report). Occasional Paper No. 8. Consultative Group to Assist the Poor.
- Guérin, Isabelle; Labie, Marc; Servet, Jean-Michel (2015). The Crises of Microcredit. Bloomsbury Academic. ISBN 978-1-78360-375-6.
- Helms, Brigit (2006). Access for All: Building Inclusive Financial Systems. hdl:10986/6973. ISBN 978-0-8213-6360-7. OCLC 63812342.
- Kearney, Terri (May 2017), An Analysis of the Loan Funds in the Skibbereen Poor Law Union 1839-49 (PDF), Skibbereen Heritage Centre
- Robinson, Marguerite S. (2001). The Microfinance Revolution: Sustainable Finance for the Poor. hdl:10986/28956. ISBN 978-0-8213-4524-5.
- Rutherford, Stuart; Arora, Sukhwinder Singh (2009). The Poor and Their Money: Microfinance from a Twenty-first Century Consumer's Perspective. Practical Action Publishing. ISBN 978-1-85339-688-5. OCLC 1204136900.
