= Count Me In (charity) =

American charitable organization

Count Me In (full name: Count Me In for Women's Economic Independence) is a charitable organization that provides financial assistance, business coaching and consulting services to woman-owned businesses. The assistance is provided through three basic programs: an online community for women business owners supplemented by live events; the "Make Mine a Million $ Business" award, providing up to US$50,000 to businesses with a minimum of two years in business and $250,000 in annual revenue; and the "Micro to Millions" award, offering up to $10,000 for businesses not meeting the time or revenue requirements for the larger award.

== History ==
Count Me In is a leading national not-for-profit provider of resources, business education and community support for women entrepreneurs seeking to grow micro businesses to million dollar enterprises. Founded in 1999 by Iris Burnett and Nell Merlino, Count Me In began as the first online microlender, and in the following years discontinued the microlending program in order to focus on providing the education and resources women need to grow their businesses and find funding from other sources.

The estimated economic impact of accelerating women's business success will generate at least four million new jobs and $700 billion in economic activity. Leading the charge and making their organizational vision a reality is co-founder with Iris Burnett, and CEO, Nell Merlino, the creative force behind Take Our Daughters to Work Day. Merlino was an entrepreneur who founded the organization based upon her personal experiences in growing her own small business. Facing questions regarding sources of capital, hiring quality talent and financial planning, she was unsure where to find answers. Recognizing that other women were likely facing similar circumstances and questions, she founded Count Me In for Women's Economic Independence to act as that informational resource.

In 2005 the "Make Mine a Million $ Business Competition"—known informally as "M3"—was launched in the cities of Dallas, Texas; Chicago, Illinois; Long Beach, California; Atlanta, Georgia; and New York, New York. Awardees were chosen by panels of local business owners. Following the initial launch, the M3 Competition spread across the country to include women entrepreneurs from every city and in every service or industry. “Beatriz Helena Ramos, founder and president of Dancing Diablo, a creative advertising company located in Brooklyn and Caracas, went from seeing herself as an artist/animator making $200K in annual business revenue to being the CEO of a million-dollar plus company creating jobs. She was the inspiration for our Make Mine a Million $ Business program.” ~Nell Marino. Today, the organization boasts a growing community of tens-of-thousands of women entrepreneurs utilizing an array of resources and tools to develop and grow their businesses.

The organization announced a goal of helping one million woman-owned companies achieve $1,000,000 in revenues by 2010. In support of this goal, Count Me In established partnerships with American Express' OPEN credit card as well as the QVC network and Cisco Systems to provide marketing and technological support.

== In media and popular culture ==
- Count Me In was Nely Galán's charity in The Apprentice (U.S. Season 7) (Celebrity Apprentice).

== See also ==
- Accion International
- Acción Emprendedora
- Accion USA
- Cooperative banking
- Flat rate (finance)
- Grama Vidiyal, Indian Microfinance Bank
- Grameen America
- Islamic banking
- Micro credit for water supply and sanitation
- Microgrant
- Opportunity International
- Project Enterprise
- Solidarity lending
