= Sixteen Decisions =

- Directed by: Gayle Ferraro
- Produced by: Gayle Ferraro; Aerial Productions
- Music by: Claudio Ragazzi
- Distributed by: Berkeley Media
- Release date: 2000
- Running time: 60 minutes
- Language: English

Sixteen Decisions is a documentary film directed and produced by Gayle Ferraro, exploring the impact of the Grameen Bank on impoverished women in Bangladesh. The bank provides micro loans of about $60 each to the poor, as well as promoting a social charter that gave the film its title.

The film was Gayle Ferraro's first, begun in 1997 and completed in 2000. It has been shown at multiple film festivals, including the 2001 New York International Independent Film and Video Festival and 2002 Women With Vision Film Festival. It won the Bronze Award for Women's Issues at the Houston Worldfest, and was broadcast by PBS in 2003

== Synopsis ==
Sixteen Decisions is filmed in an experimental style, skipping between past, present, and future to follow the life of a teenager named Selina. A sixteen-year-old mother of two, Selina lives a life typical for poor women in Bangladesh. She was a child laborer at the age of seven, married at the age of twelve, and had her first child at the age of thirteen. Her family sold their land to pay her dowry, and when her father lost his sight, they were left beggars. The $60 loan she receives from Grameen Bank allows her to put the down payment on a bicycle rickshaw and buy chickens whose eggs she can sell. The film shows group meetings where community members recite the Sixteen Decisions that Grameen Bank uses to improve the lives of those it loans to and help ensure that the people are able to repay these loans.

The founder of Grameen Bank, Muhammad Yunus, is a former Fulbright Scholar from Bangladesh. He is known for developing the concept of providing small loans to entrepreneurs who would not qualify for bank loans, in a practice called microcredit. At the time of the documentary, he had loaned $2 million to ten million women, with a repayment rate of 99%. He has continued his campaign against poverty with the co-founding of Grameen America, which Gayle Ferraro documented in the follow-up film To Catch a Dollar. Yunus's dedication to battling global poverty earned him the Nobel Peace Prize in 2006, and he has declared that his mission is to "help create a world free of poverty.

== Making of the documentary ==
It took Gayle Ferraro three trips to Bangladesh to make Sixteen Decisions. She self-financed both the travel and the production, taking her friend Rebecca Boylan to help as a camera person. It was released as an independent film by Ferraro's film company, Aerial Production, after which it was taken around the country to art cinemas and special interest groups.

== The Sixteen Decisions ==
One of the foundations of Grameen Bank is its charter, which contains sixteen decisions that are recited during group meetings. The decisions are:

1. We shall follow and advance the four principles of Discipline, Unity, Courage, and Hard work in all walks of our lives.

2. We shall bring prosperity to our families.

3. We shall repair our homes and work towards constructing new houses.

4. We shall grow vegetables all year round. We shall eat plenty of them and sell the surplus.

5. We shall plant as many seedlings as possible during the plantation seasons.

6. We shall plan to keep our families small, minimize our expenditures, and look after our health.

7. We shall educate our children and ensure that they can earn to pay for their education.

8. We shall keep our children and our environment clean.

9. We shall build and use latrines.

10. We shall drink water from tubewells. If they are not available, we shall boil water or use alum.

11. We shall not take any dowry at our sons' weddings, nor shall we give any dowry at our daughters wedding. We shall not practice child marriage.

12. We shall not inflict any injustice on anyone, nor shall we allow anyone to do so.

13. We shall collectively undertake bigger investments for higher incomes.

14. We shall always be ready to help each other. If anyone is experiencing difficulty, we shall all help him or her.

15. If we come to know of any breach of discipline in any centre, we shall all go there and help restore discipline.

16. We shall take part in all social activities collectively.
