= Rise Asset Development =

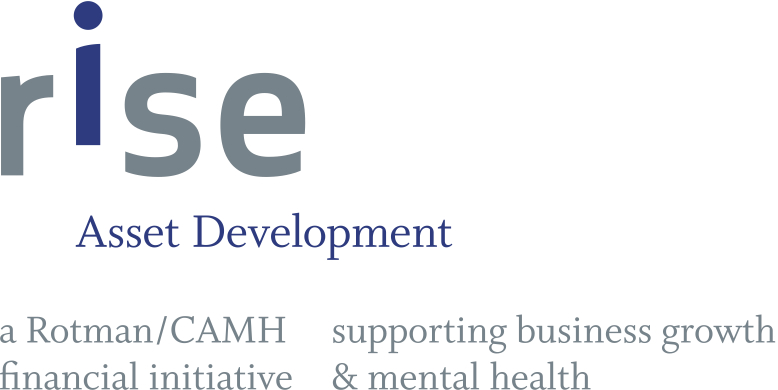
- Industry: Domestic Microfinance
- Founded: 2009
- Headquarters: Toronto
- Area served: Ontario
- Key people: Sandra Rotman, Donor; Joseph Rotman; Narinder Dhami, Founding Executive Director
- Products: Financial services Microfinance; Mental health Addictions
- Revenue: 944,416 Canadian dollar (2016)
- Total assets: 1,085,071 Canadian dollar (2016)
- Number of employees: 6 (2016)
- Website: www.riseassetdevelopment.com

Rise Asset Development (also known as Rise) provides microfinancing and mentorship to eligible entrepreneurs living with mental health and addiction challenges, who are interested in pursuing self-employment. Rise offers business financing in the form of loans, leases and other investments, based on stage of development, needs and capacity. Rise provides business financing for up to $25,000 throughout Ontario, with an average loan of $3,000 to $5,000. The Rotman School of Management and Centre for Addiction and Mental Health participate in advisory functions, lending their respective expertise for business mentoring and mental health support and services for the benefit of Rise clients. In January 2012, Rise received the Social Entrepreneurship in Mental Health Equity Award from the Dystonia Medical Research Foundation Canada (DMRFC).

== History ==
Sandra Rotman, Rise Asset Development's founder, works with the Rotman School of Management (University of Toronto) and Ontario Hospital's world leading Centre for Addiction and Mental Health (CAMH), for their respective expertise.

Initial funding was provided by Sandra Rotman via a Rise pilot program, which assisted entrepreneurs living with mental health and addiction challenges. The pilot program allowed participants to explore self-employment, where they obtained skills to build successful, self-sustaining small businesses.

In 2009, the initial pilot program helped a small group of emerging entrepreneurs to access investment capital, business mentoring and support. The pilot program confirmed that Rise's financial assistance and support could help grow small businesses, while improving the prospects of a marginalized segment of the community. The program has allowed certain clients to graduate from the Ontario Disability Support Program and become more self-sufficient.

In 2012, the Ontario Ministry of Youth Services announced that they formed a new partnership with Rise to create a program that targets youth living with mental health and addiction challenges. The goal of this initiative is to work with fifty young entrepreneurs between the ages of 16 and 29 over three years. Rise will deliver the program and provide microfinancing, while Ontario will finance the business training for these young entrepreneurs.

In the same year, Rise expanded services to Ottawa and other Ontario communities. Rise is working alongside Causeway Work Centre to deliver microfinancing in the Ottawa region with support from Alterna Savings.

Rise has attracted other funders, including Citi Canada (the Canadian branch of New-York based Citibank) and the Royal Bank of Canada.

In addition, Rise has launched a pilot group-lending program with the help of the Citi Foundation.

=== Mental health, addiction and self-employment ===
Health Canada estimates that 1 in 5 Ontarians will experience serious mental health or substance abuse issues in their lifetime. In 2007–08, Ontario spent more than $2.5 billion on mental health and addiction services.

Employment has been identified as a leading component in promoting positive mental health and a fulfilling community life. Individuals who return to work demonstrate significant improvements in self-esteem and symptoms management, when compared to those who do not work. For most people, meaningful employment is key to economic and social well-being. However, individuals living with mental illness and addictions are stigmatized and encounter barriers in finding or maintaining employment.

In 2001, a group of 149 unemployed clients with severe mental illness received vocational rehabilitation at 6-month intervals throughout an 18-month study, where they were assessed on the effects of work on their psychiatric symptoms, quality of life, and self-esteem. Participants were assigned to four different groups: competitive work, sheltered work, minimal work, or no work. The competitive work group showed significantly greater improvement than the other groups. The larger body of research on employment for people with mental illness is supported by numerous studies.

Self-employment is an appropriate strategy to combat the high unemployment rate among this population. Entrepreneurship can also provide supplementary income to one's primary job to further assist those living with mental illness and addictions, which can also enhance their quality of life and economic well-being. The self-employed held their jobs for over 12 months at a rate 54% vs. 35% for those that were employees. Additionally, the self-employed jobs more closely mirror the job sectors of the general population.

== Program ==
Rise provides loans, leases, lines of credit and other financial products. The loan term is up to 3 years, with an average loan size of $3,000 to $5,000. Rise also provides clients with business mentorship and support. The program targets people with mental health and addiction challenges who cannot obtain loans through traditional means due to a bad credit history, no credit or no savings.

In June 2012, Rise launched its Youth Small Business Program, which targets young adults between the ages of 16 and 29. This business training program is offered to individuals living with mental health or addiction challenges and provides a $500 start-up grant for their business. Upon completion of the program, entrepreneurs may be eligible for traditional Rise financing.

Rise Asset Development committed over $200,000 in financing to entrepreneurs living with mental illness and addictions throughout Ontario (Canada) in 2013. Rise planned to scale its model to three new cities within Ontario, grow its mentorship program across the province, build a targeted youth program and pilot a group lending product targeting transitional homes, community housing and existing peer mental health or addiction support groups.

== Mission ==
According to its website, Rise's mission is to improve the lives of people who are unable to secure employment due to mental health or addiction challenges. Recognizing the interdependency of financial well-being to one's overall quality of life, Rise aims to empower business owners with access to financing and business support.

== Future ==
Rise is expanding its program across the province. Rise has launched its operations in Ottawa through the Causeway Work Centre.

== See also ==
- Accion USA
- Centre for Addiction and Mental Health
- Grameen America
- Grameen Bank
- Project Enterprise
