= To Catch a Dollar =

To Catch a Dollar: Muhammad Yunus Banks on America
- Directed by: Gayle Ferraro
- Produced by: Gayle Ferraro; Aerial Productions
- Music by: Claudio Ragazzi
- Release date: January 2010 (Sundance)
- Running time: 85 minutes
- Country: United States
- Language: English

To Catch a Dollar: Muhammad Yunus Banks on America is a 2010 documentary film directed and produced by Gayle Ferraro about the 2006 Nobel Peace Prize winner's ongoing campaign against poverty around the world. It touches on the beginnings of the original Grameen Bank in the 1970s, then focuses primarily on the beginnings of Grameen America's work in the US, especially the launch of its first programs in Queens, New York in 2008. The title of the film comes from a clip of Muhammed Yunus speaking in the film: "In a world where you need a dollar to catch a dollar, you need to have something to help the bottom people to lift themselves up."

The film premiered at the 2010 Sundance Film Festival. It is expected to open in New York City and Los Angeles in early 2011 and then go into general release in the United States and abroad.

== Summary ==
The film focuses on the work of Shah Newaz, a long time Grameen Bank manager, and Alethia Mendez, a Grameen America Center Manager, as they undergo the process of successfully establishing the programs of Grameen America in Queens, New York. The film features stories of some of Grameen America's first clients, women below the poverty line working to build businesses such as a hair salon and a bakery. It shows Newez and Mendez working out of a small office and holding group meetings in people's homes, as group meetings are a core element of the Grameen Bank peer lending model.

Yunus, a former Fulbright Scholar from Bangladesh, is known for developing the concept of microcredit, the extension of small loans to entrepreneurs with no collateral to qualify for traditional bank loans. His concept of microcredit and his desire to reduce the number of people living in poverty led to the creation of Grameen Bank to support people within Bangladesh, and then the Grameen Foundation for supporting people internationally. Cofounded by Yunus, Grameen America opened in January 2008 with a mission "to help create a world free of poverty." In June 2010, Grameen America reported that it had disbursed approximately $4.3 million in loans to 2,002 borrowers and had maintained a repayment rate of 99%.
