= Acción Emprendedora =

- Formation: 2002
- Founded at: Santiago de Chile
- Type: non-profit organization
- Location: Santiago de Chile, Chile
- Region served: Chile
- Methods: training and assisting owners of poor micro-enterprises
- Website: www.accionemprendedora.org

Acción Emprendedora (AE) is a non-profit organization founded in 2002 in Chile. The organization claims to seek the eradication of poverty by training and assisting poor small business owners and helping microentrepreneurs grow their businesses through education and mediating loan negotiations. Based in Santiago de Chile, it is present in seven major cities throughout Chile.

In Chile, 98% of businesses are small businesses and micro-enterprises, and 62% of national employment is linked to micro-enterprises, half of whose employees have not completed their basic education.

== Development model ==
AE uses a three-step development model:

1. AE offers basic and advanced business classes in entrepreneurial communities.
2. AE provides access to low-rate microcredit that would be otherwise unavailable to impoverished communities.
3. AE provides free consulting services during the initial development or growth of the micro-enterprise, as well as free access to technology.

== History ==
Since 2003, AE has trained over 3,000 micro-entrepreneurs, and in the Santiago Learning Center alone, trained 500 micro-entrepreneurs in 2010. AE also mediates loans for its entrepreneurs through various banks including the Banco de Dessarrollo, Banco Santander, and the Women's World Banking FINAM. For its efforts, AE has received international recognition from the Inter-American Development Bank as one of the 40 best social projects in Latin America.

== Awards ==
AE has received awards in Chile and throughout Latin America.

- In 2004, AE was named as one of the 40 best social projects in Latin America by the Inter-American Development Bank.
- In 2005, AE was awarded "Social Entrepreneur of the Year" by the Federation of Chilean Industry (SOFOFA) and Universidad del Desarrollo.
- In 2008, AE was awarded the Duke University NGO Excellence Award.
- In 2009, AE won the Miguel Kast Prize for Free Market Solutions to Poverty by the Atlas Economic Research Foundation.
- In 2010, AE was awarded the Atlas Foundation Prize.
- In 2011, AE won the Duke Center for International Development (DCID) Alumni Award for NGO Excellence.

== Learning centers ==
AE currently has 6 entrepreneurial centers in Chile located in Santiago, Valparaíso, Concepción, Antofagasta, San Pedro de Atacama, and Coronel. Additionally, AE has continued expansion into neighboring countries including Guatemala, where AE had to close due to political instability and Peru, where it is still active today. Future plans include opening a learning center in Durham, NC, because AE finished as a finalist in the Duke University Start-Up Challenge. Other plans include sharing the AE model in Ecuador.

== See also ==
- Accion International
- Accion USA
- Grameen Bank
- Project Enterprise
