= Microgrant =

A microgrant is a small sum of money distributed to an individual or organization, typically for hundreds or thousands of dollars, with the intent of enabling the recipient to develop or sustain an income-generating enterprise. Often they target individuals living on less than $1/day, extreme poverty, for the purpose of creating a sustainable livelihood or microenterprise. Recipients of microgrants can also be organizations or grassroots groups that are engaged in charitable activities. While microfinance and other financial services are intended to serve the poor, many of the poorest are either too risk-averse to seek out a loan, or do not qualify for a microloan or other form of microcredit.

There are three primary types of microgrants; one is a small sum of money (~US$50–500) granted to an individual to start an income-generating project, another is a small grant (~$2,000–$10,000) to a community for an impact-oriented project and a third is a small grant to an individual for any cause they see fit.

The term microgrant can also refer to a grant that is low in value.

== Income-generating projects ==
Microgrants are available for individuals or small groups to start income generating projects. Unlike microcredits, microgrants do not need to be repaid and so the project does not start with debt that needs to be repaid. While microfinance and other financial services are intended to serve the poor, many of the poorest are either too risk-averse or unaware of such offers.

== Community-based projects ==
A microgrant serves as an opportunity for communities facing poverty to receive funding for impact-oriented projects, such as schools, health centers, farms and more. Microgrants for community projects provide a novel opportunity for people facing poverty to solve their own local problems with financing that need not be paid back.

For example, Spark MicroGrants is known for such community-based approach to microgranting. Spark pairs capacity building facilitation with their microgrants to ensure communities receiving the grants are well positioned to take them on.

== See also ==
- Crowdfunding
- International development
- Microfinance
- Microcredit for water supply and sanitation
- Solidarity lending
