= Gayle Ferraro =

American film producer

Gayle Ferraro is a New York-based filmmaker best known for her documentary film To Catch a Dollar: Muhammad Yunus Banks on American (2010). Her first film was Sixteen Decisions, a 2000 documentary about the effect of Muhammad Yunus' Grameen Bank on impoverished women in Bangladesh. Ferraro also produced and directed Anonymously Yours (2002), a feature documentary about sex trafficking in Burma, and Ganges: River to Heaven (2003), a documentary about a hospice in Varanasi, India.
