= Flat rate =

Pricing method

A flat fee, also referred to as a flat rate or a linear rate refers to a pricing structure that charges a single fixed fee for a service, regardless of usage. Less commonly, the term may refer to a rate that does not vary with usage or time of use.

== Advantages ==
- A business can develop a dependable stance in a market, as consumers have a well-rounded price before the service is undertaken. For instance, a technician may charge $150 for his labor.
- Potential costs can be covered. The service may result in inevitable expenses like the parts needed to fix the issue or the items required to complete the order.
- No restricted structure is needed, as the pricing system can be adjusted to suit the business using it. Management can thus work out the pricing that best matches the company's objectives, efforts, costs, etc.

== Disadvantages ==
- The fixed pricing restricts the company's capability to meet the needs of individual consumers, and people search for cheaper alternatives.
- Pricing competition thickens, with other companies in the same industry compete for the lowest pricing, and tough competition occurs.
- Inflation can cause unprecedented losses, and companies must raise the charge to keep up with costs.

== Examples ==
=== Postage ===
There are flat rates in the postal service, regarding the delivery of items. Postage companies use different forms of post, boxes or envelopes, to avoid having to weigh items. The on-hand cost lets consumers identify the cost and removes the hassle of estimate the cost for items.

The United States Postal Service offers flat-rate pricing for packages selling different postage options varying in size and shape. That provides consumers with an array of options upfront, creating a sense of ease. When shipped in higher volumes, it saves money but there are issues if both the flat rate and regular delivery systems are used simultaneously.

=== Advertising ===
Flat rate also passes into advertising. Purchasing advertisements on websites such as Facebook, Twitter and YouTube is sold a flat rates on the size (with a surcharge for images and posts) and length of the advertisement (video costs extra). Advertising on YouTube pitches at a flat rate of $0.30 per view. When a person runs by the YouTube home page, search page, or wherever the ad is running, the charge is $0.30.

=== Tradesmen ===
Tradesmen such as electricians, plumbers, and mechanics, also often charge flat rates to cover their labour for their services. In a survey in 2014 in Australia, the average labour rate for a painter was $39.92 per hour.

=== Telephony ===
American telecommunications companies commonly offer a flat rate to residential customers for local telephone calls. However, a regular rate or Message Rate is advantageous for those who make only a few short calls per month. Flat rates were rare outside the US and Canada until about 2005, but they have since become widespread in Europe for both local and long-distance calls and are now also available for mobile phone services, both for traditional GSM/UMTS voice calls and for Mobile VoIP.

Most VoIP services are effectively flat-rate telephony services since only the broadband internet fees must be paid for PC-to-PC calls, and the calls themselves are free. Some PC-to-telephone services, such as SkypeOut offer flat rates for national calls to landlines.

=== Television ===
Premium television or Pay TV usually charges a flat monthly fee for a channel or a bundle or "tier" of channels, but some cable television companies also offer Pay per view pricing.

=== Internet ===
For Internet service providers, flat rate is access to the Internet at all hours and days of the year (linear rate) and for all customers of the telco operator (universal) at a fixed and cheap tariff.

Flat rate is common in broadband access to the Internet in the US and many other countries.

A charge tariff is a class of linear rate, different from the flat rate, where the user is charged by the uploads and downloads (data transfers). Some GPRS / data UMTS access to the Internet in some countries of Europe has no flat rate pricing, following the traditional "metered mentality". Because of this, users prefer using fixed lines (with narrow or broadband access) to connect to the Internet.

A wavy rate is not a linear rate, because the Internet surfer pays the monthly fixed price to use the connection only during a certain range of hours of the day (i.e. only in the morning or, more typically, only at night).

=== Street lighting ===
Cities and towns normally arrange a flat fee for the power used by street lights. This is because the lights come on and turn off at predictable times, generally off-peak, and the total draw for the entire town can be accurately calculated in advance. This allows the lamps to be placed on existing poles and wired directly into the electrical wiring without a separate meter.

=== Electricity ===
A "flat rate" (more accurately known as fixed rate) for electricity is a fixed price per unit (kWh), not a fixed price per month, and thus different from that for other services. An electric utility that charges a flat rate for electricity does not charge different rates based upon the demand that the customer places on the system. A customer pays the same amount whether they use the electricity in bursts during mid-day, when demand and the utility's costs are highest, or if they spread it out over the entire day. However, if the customer uses a different amount of electricity, they are charged a higher or lower amount. Residential customers and small businesses are usually charged a flat rate, though not the same rate per kilowatt-hour. A special type of electricity meter, a time of use meter, is required to charge a non-flat rate. Time of use meters can lower a customer's electricity bill, if they use electricity mostly during off-peak hours. Some utilities will allow a customer to change to a time of use meter, but they charge for the cost of the meter and installation.

=== Real estate ===
In real estate, "flat rate" is an alternative, nontraditional full service listing where compensation to the listing agent is not based on a percentage of the selling price but instead is a fixed dollar amount that is typically paid at closing. The rate is generally less than a gross 6% commission, resulting in a lowered cost of selling real estate. "Flat rate" is different from "flat fee" in several ways: i) it is generally substantially more than a "flat fee" rate; ii) it generally represents a full service listing as opposed to a "flat fee" limited service listing; and iii) it is usually paid at closing, as opposed to a "flat fee", which is usually paid when the listing agreement is executed.

== Transport ==
In most parts of the world regular users of public transport, especially commuters, make use of weekly, monthly or yearly season tickets that allow unlimited travel for a fixed fee. In some countries year passes are available for the entire national railway network (e.g. the Bahncard100 in Germany for about €3000 and the Österreichcard offered by the Austrian Federal Railways). Some, such as the Eurail Pass, are intended for foreigners, in order to encourage tourism.

Road users are normally charged a combination of fixed and variable fees, in the form of vehicle duty and fuel duty. Motorway tolls in some countries (Switzerland, Austria, Czech Republic, Slovenia) are paid by purchasing weekly, monthly or annual stickers attached to the windscreen.

At some stage, the concept of the flat rate was even introduced into passenger air traffic in the form of American Airlines' AAirpass.

== Parcel/document delivery ==
In dealing with the shipping of parcels and documents, a "flat rate for international deliveries of packet size #1" would mean that the same shipping charge (for example US$15.00) would be applicable to all packets of this size, regardless of their designated destination (country of recipient), and regardless of the quantity of their contents, i.e. whether they contained one sheet of paper or were filled to the maximum.

== Labor ==
Flat rate is a pricing scheme whereby the customer pays a fixed price for a service regardless of how long the worker takes to carry out the service. Flat rate manuals are based on timed studies of the typical time taken for each type of service. Flat rate helps provide a uniform pricing menu for service work and helps establish the worth of performing a particular job. In recent times some automotive companies have begun using computer algorithms to calculate labor times with a high degree of accuracy.

The benefit to the customer is that if a worker takes longer than this, the cost does not rise. The downfall to the customer is that this can lead to overpaying in some cases.

The benefit to the worker is that it promotes incentive to learn how to do the work more efficiently. This system can also cost the worker if they do not perform a job within the allotted time such as in the case of an inexperienced worker or on a job where there is something preventing the service from being performed that the labor manual can't take into account. In automotive shops this is common due to rusted, seized, or stripped bolts or aftermarket installations. In some circumstances automotive technicians can get paid 0 hours for working a 12-hour day.

It can be difficult to compare prices between hourly-paid and flat-rate services, and this sometimes causes rejection of flat rate shops over hourly ones.

== Medical ==
One of the newest areas where flat rate pricing is just beginning to make inroads is the medical industry. The concept has held a particular interest because of the high and rising costs of health care delivery despite legislative attempts to address them, such the Affordable Care Act (Obamacare). While there have been pilot programs launched by major insurance carriers such as UnitedHealthcare to control costs in the most costly medical conditions like cancer, for now the primary application of flat-rate pricing has been in medical imaging, such as x-rays, MRIs, mammograms, and ultrasounds. Regional companies such as Med Health Services Inc. in the Pittsburgh area and Northwest Radiology Network of Indianapolis have been among the first in the nation to implement the practice on a trial basis.

== See also ==
- Flat fee MLS
- Flat rate (finance)
- Flat tax
- Rural Internet
- Too cheap to meter
