= Bond of association =

Social connection among the members of credit unions and co-operative banks

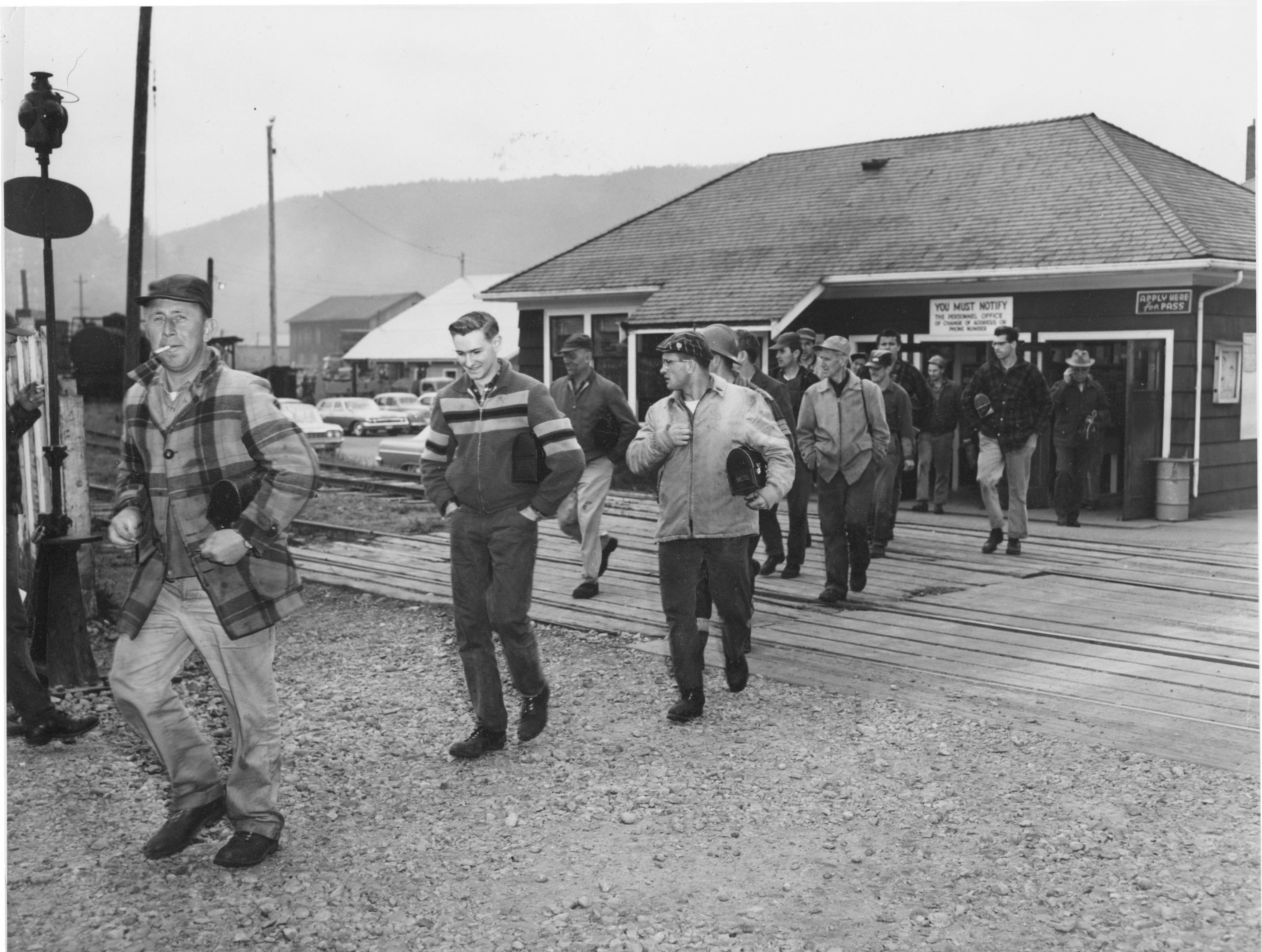
These millworkers chartered the first credit union in British Columbia. Powell River, Canada, 1939.

The (common) bond of association or common bond is the social connection among the members of credit unions and co-operative banks. Common bonds substitute for collateral in the early stages of financial system development. Like solidarity lending, the common bond has since played an important role in facilitating the development of microfinance for poor people.

In modern financial systems, common bonds remain a key building block, especially for the strategic networks that underpin many of Europe’s co-operative banks.

== How bonds work ==
Hermann Schulze-Delitzsch, an early co-operative organizer, explained the concept of the ‘bond of association’ at credit union meetings in this way:

... your own selves and character must create your credit, and your collective liability will require you to choose your associates carefully, and to insist that they maintain regular, sober and industrious habits, making them worthy of credit.

In his book People’s Banks (1910), Henry W. Wolff summarized the character of this ‘common bond’ based on his observations of credit unions all over Europe:

1. many individuals bring small amounts of share capital into a common pool, which collectively amounts to significant base of collateral,
2. borrowers, lenders and guarantors live near one another (e.g., in the same village), making it convenient for the lender and guarantors to monitor the performance of the borrower, and manage any problems that may come up,
3. an ‘inter-connection of liability among members’ is created by the bond, which may either involve direct and unlimited ‘financial liability’, or ‘direct responsibility for good management’ (which once publicly established increases the sense of security of claim-holders), and
4. all operations of the credit union must be conducted along ‘businesslike lines’ based on a strong sense of collective responsibility.

== Diverse types of bonds ==
There are several distinct types of bonds, corresponding to distinctive types of credit unions. For example:

- The Raiffeisen banks in Germany relied on parish-based bonds, as parishes were very small and people were in constant communication with each other through the central nexus of the local church. Similarly, the Caisses populaires of Quebec were originally "organized along the boundaries of Roman Catholic parishes".
- The bonds on the multi-ethnic Canadian Prairies were community-based, linking members through their common residency in small towns and villages.
- Common bonds in early United States credit unions were generally employee-based, and concentrated in the manufacturing and transportation industries, and among soldiers, teachers and postal workers.
- The bonds of many credit unions in Kenya are based on out-growers – farmers who deliver tea, sugar and other cash-crops under contract to a company that handles marketing and sales.

== Debate between Schulze-Delitzsch and Raiffeisen ==
A bitter debate between two German credit union pioneers over the nature of bonds of association eventually ended in a tie, with Schulze-Delitzsch’s approach dominating in urban settings, and Raiffeisen’s dominating in rural ones.

The bond of association for Schulze-Delitzsche’s larger, more urban ‘people’s banks’ required all members to contribute substantial share capital. He advocated that the banks should receive the protection of limited liability.

Friedrich Wilhelm Raiffeisen strongly opposed any share capital requirement. Arguing that most farmers had too little cash to afford share capital, he maintained that the principle of unlimited joint liability was "indispensable in small districts". Instead, it was needed "in order to prevent the Unions from excess, since it makes the administrative bodies conscious of their moral and material responsibilities."

== See also ==
- History of credit unions
- Microfinance
- National Credit Union Administration v. First National Bank & Trust Co.
