= Ganges: River to Heaven =

- Directed by: Gayle Ferraro
- Produced by: Gayle Ferraro
- Edited by: Keiko Deguchi
- Music by: Claudio Ragazzi
- Distributed by: Aerial Productions
- Release date: November 21, 2003 (Amsterdam International Documentary Film Festival)
- Running time: 77 minutes
- Country: United States

Ganges: River to Heaven, is a 2003 American documentary film by Boston filmmaker, Gayle Ferraro. The film documents the culture and beliefs of the Hindu religion across the Ganges River which has been considered holy in India.

== Production ==
A five-person film crew including Australian cinematographer Laurie K Gilbert MySC, spent almost four weeks living at Assi Ghat, Varanasi on the banks of the Ganges River and during that time fully documented the religious culture and rituals associated with both life and death in this photogenic region of the subcontinent of India. The film crew included three of the most experienced and talented professional technicians available in India.

== Reception ==
Dennis Harvey of Variety reviewed "At once lyrical and smell-the-stench gritty, "Ganges: River to Heaven" provides a respectful, often engrossing overview of the water body that's among the world's holiest sites. Visually handsome package is enlightening on several levels, resulting in an attractive fest item with good prospects for public tubecast and possible limited theatrical exposure". Devin D. O'Leary of Alibi said "The film's only major drawback is that it never digs quite deep enough into its subject matter. The film is undeniably beautiful, shot with an eye for everyday detail—something which India is overflowing with. Still, as a simple, gorgeously shot primer on Hindu spirituality, Ganges: River of Heaven works, delivering the worthwhile message that maybe death can lead to a greater life.
