= Grameen Bank =

Bank and microfinancer in Bangladesh

- Badge of Grameen Bank
- Native name: গ্রামীণ ব্যাংক
- Type: Statutory public authority
- Industry: Bank
- Founded: 2 October 1983; 42 years ago
- Founder: Muhammad Yunus
- Headquarters: Dhaka, Bangladesh
- Number of locations: 2,568 branches (2022)
- Area served: Bangladesh
- Key people: Abdul Hannan Chowdhury (Chairman); Sarder Akhter Hamed (Managing Director)
- Products: Microfinance; Banking services Consumer Banking; Investment Banking
- Net income: ৳2360.49 million (2022)
- AUM: ৳169.251 billion (members), ৳74.94 billion (non-members)
- Total assets: ৳301.05 billion (2022)
- Total equity: ৳26.920 billion (2022)
- Number of employees: 18,203 (2022)
- Website: grameenbank.org.bd

Grameen Bank (Bengali: গ্রামীণ ব্যাংক) is a microfinance, specialized community development bank founded in Bangladesh. It provides small loans (known as microcredit or "grameencredit") to the impoverished without requiring collateral.

It is a statutory public authority. It is originated in 1976, in the work of Muhammad Yunus, a professor at the University of Chittagong, who launched a research project to study how to design a credit delivery system to provide banking services to the rural poor. In October 1983, the Grameen Bank was authorized by national legislation to operate as an independent bank.

In 1998, the Bank's "Low-cost Housing Program" won a World Habitat Award. In 2006, the bank and its founder, Muhammad Yunus, were jointly awarded the Nobel Peace Prize.

The bank's success has inspired similar projects in more than 64 countries around the world, including a World Bank initiative to finance Grameen-type lending systems.

== History ==
Muhammad Yunus was inspired during the Bangladesh famine of 1974, to lend a total of US$27 to 42 people (mostly bamboo stool makers), as start-up money so that they could make items for sale, without the burdens of high interest under predatory lending. Yunus believed that making such loans available to a larger population could stimulate businesses and reduce the widespread rural poverty in Bangladesh.

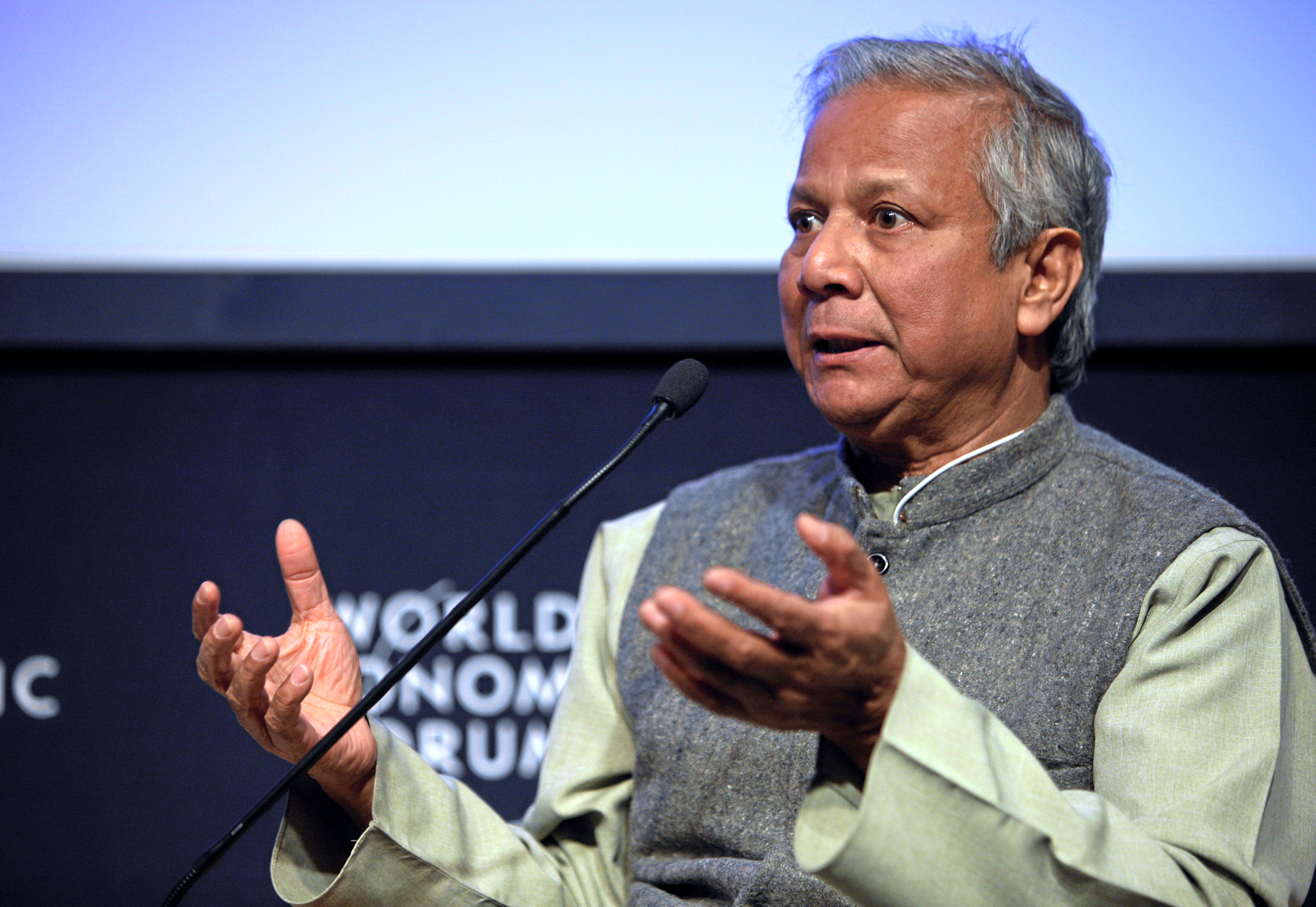
Nobel Laureate Muhammad Yunus, the bank's founder

Yunus developed the principles of the Grameen Bank through his research and fieldwork at the University of Chittagong. Grameen Bank is Bengali for "Rural" or "Village" Bank. He began a research project with the University of Chittagong and in cooperation with Janata Bank, extending microcredit to test his method for providing credit and banking services to the rural poor. In 1976, the village of Jobra became the first to be served by the project. Over the next two years, the project expanded to other villages in the area. The project, with support from the Bangladesh Bank, was extended in 1979 to the Tangail District (to the north of the capital, Dhaka). The project's services expanded to other districts of Bangladesh over the next few years.

Through an ordinance of the Bangladesh government dated 2 October 1983, the project was converted into the Grameen Bank. Bankers Ron Grzywinski and Mary Houghton, of ShoreBank, a community development bank in Chicago, helped Yunus incorporate the bank under a grant from the Ford Foundation. The bank's repayment rate suffered from economic disruption following the 1998 flood in Bangladesh, but it recovered in subsequent years. By the beginning of 2005, the bank had loaned over US$4.7 billion and by the end of 2008, $7.6 billion to the poor.

In 2011, the Bangladesh government forced Yunus to resign from Grameen Bank, saying that at age 72, he was years beyond the legal limit for the position.

Grameen Bank soon began expanding into wealthy countries. As of 2017, Grameen America had 19 branches in eleven US cities, and its nearly 100,000 borrowers were all women.

In 2024, Professor Abdul Hannan Chowdhury was appointed as the new Chairman of Grameen Bank.

As of January 2025, a proposed law aims to reduce the government's stake in Grameen Bank from 25% to 5%, while amending the Grameen Bank Act of 2013. The changes would lower the number of government-appointed directors from three to one and shift the election of the chairman from the government to the 12-member board. These measures seek to restore the bank's governance to its pre-2011 framework, increasing control for microcredit borrowers and decreasing state involvement.

== Funding ==
"The bank has gained its funding from different sources, and the main contributors have shifted over time." In the initial years, donor agencies used to provide the bulk of capital at low rates. By the mid-1990s, the bank began to get most of its funding from the central bank of Bangladesh. More recently, Grameen has started bond sales as a source of finance. The bonds are implicitly subsidised, as they are guaranteed by the Government of Bangladesh, and still they are sold above the bank rate. In 2013, Bangladesh parliament passed 'Grameen Bank Act,' which replaces the Grameen Bank Ordinance, 1983, authorising the government to make rules for any aspect of the running of the bank.

== Donations ==
In 2016, Grameen America donated between $100,000 and $250,000, while Grameen Research, another Grameen arm, donated between $25,000 and $50,000 to the Clinton Foundation. When he was under investigation in Bangladesh over matters pertaining to oversight of a nonprofit bank, and had to resign from the bank's board, he also reportedly wrote to the Clintons, requesting help from the 'aides' on the matter. Yunus had to eventually step down as the managing director of Grameen Bank.

== Application of microcredit ==
Grameen Bank is founded on the principle that loans are better than charity for reducing hardship. The bank believes that all people have the potential for upward social mobility. Grameen has offered credit to usually underserved groups including the poor, women, illiterate, and unemployed people, who lack access to formal financial services. Access to credit is based on reasonable terms, such as the group lending system, and weekly-instalment payments, with reasonably long terms of loans.

Grameen's goal is to foster financial independence among the poor. Yunus encourages all borrowers to become savers, enabling local capital to fund additional loans. Since 1995, 90% of Grameen's loans have been financed through interest income and customer deposits, aligning the interests of borrowers and depositor-shareholders. Deposits collected in villages are converted into loans for others in the same communities (Yunus and Jolis 1998).

In a country in which few women may take out loans from large commercial banks, Grameen has focused on women borrowers; around 97% of its members are women. While a World Bank study has concluded that women's access to microcredit empowers them through greater access to resources and control over decision making, some other economists argue that the relationship between microcredit and women-empowerment is less straightforward.

Grameen has diversified the types of loans it makes. It supports hand-powered wells and loans to support the enterprises of Grameen members' immediate closers. It has found that seasonal agricultural loans and lease-to-own agreements for equipment and livestock help the poor establish better agriculture.

16 Decisions of Grameen Bank
1	We shall reflect on the following four principles of Grameen Bank in every sphere of life to make it a prosperous organization through the members of the Center: Discipline, Unity, Courage, Hard Work.
2	We shall improve our quality of life by bringing prosperity to our families.
3	We shall arrange for safe accommodation. We shall build improved and durable houses at the earliest.
4	We shall cultivate vegetables throughout the year, meet our own nutrition needs by having plenty of them, and increase income by selling the same.
5	During the planting season, we shall plant as many seedlings as possible to protect the environment and create our own resources.
6	We shall plan to keep our families small by having maximum two children. If possible, one will be the priority. We shall ensure all types of vaccinations for our children.
7	We shall ensure education of all children of the members of the center and shall educate them in technical and higher studies.
8	We shall keep our environment clean and tidy and ensure health care for all members of our families.
9	We shall use sanitary latrines and clean our hands with soap.
10	We shall drink tube well water. We shall use pure water in every household work.
11	We shall avoid dowry in the marriage of our sons and daughters, and shall not entertain child marriage. We shall confirm marriage registration.
12	We shall treat everyone well. We shall live together in family and in society.
13	We shall create new entrepreneurs to make our children self-reliant.
14	We shall always help each other. If anyone in the center falls in any danger, we shall rescue him from the danger together.
15	We shall be careful in conducting the transaction; we shall not transact without the passbook and shall keep the passbook with our own.
16	We shall regularly attend the center meeting and we pay back our loan regularly.

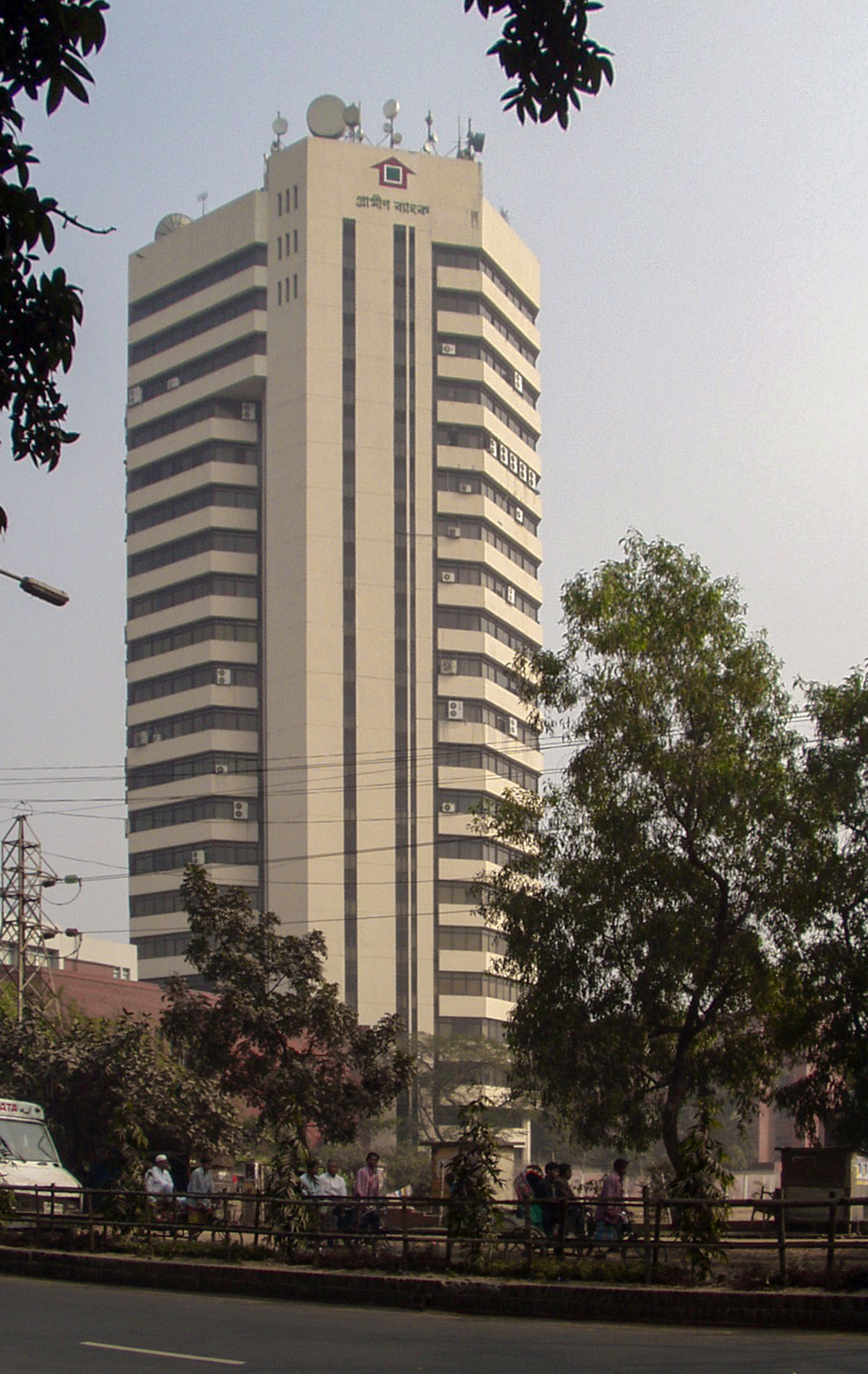
Grameen Bank Building in Dhaka

Grameen Bank is known for its system of solidarity lending. It incorporates a set of values embodied in Bangladesh, by the Sixteen Decisions (updated to Eighteen Decisions in 2023). At every section of Grameen Bank, the borrowers recite these Decisions, and vow to follow them. As a result of the Eighteen Decisions, Grameen borrowers are encouraged to adopt positive social habits. One such habit includes educating children by sending them to school. Since the bank embraced the Sixteen Decisions, almost all Grameen borrowers have their school-age children enrolled in regular classes. This, in turn helps bring about lifestyle change, and educate the next generation.

Solidarity lending is a cornerstone of microcredit, and the system was used in more than 43 countries as of 1988. Repayment responsibility rests solely on the individual borrower. No formal joint liability exists, i.e. group members are not obliged to pay on behalf of a defaulting member. But, in practice the group members often contribute the defaulted amount with an intention to collect the money from the defaulted member at a later time. Such behaviour is encouraged because Grameen does not extend further credit to a group in which a member defaults.

No legal instrument (i.e. no written contract) is made between Grameen Bank and its borrowers; the system works based on trust. To supplement the lending, Grameen Bank requires the borrowing members to save very small amounts regularly in a number of funds, designated for emergency, the group, etc. These savings help serve as an insurance against contingencies.

In other areas, Grameen has had high payback rates—over 98 percent. Yet, according to The Wall Street Journal, in 2001, a fifth of the bank's loans were more than a year overdue. Grameen says that more than half of its borrowers in Bangladesh (close to 50 million) have risen out of acute poverty thanks to their loan, as measured by such standards as having all children of school age in school, all household members eating three meals a day, a sanitary toilet, a rainproof house, clean drinking water, and the ability to repay a 300 taka-a-week (around US$4) loan.

The bank is also engaged in social business and entrepreneurship fields. In 2009, the Grameen Creative Lab collaborated with the Yunus Centre to make the Global Social Business Summit. The meeting has become the main platform for social businesses worldwide to foster discussions, actions and collaborations to develop effective solutions to the most pressing problems plaguing the world.

=== Village phone program ===
The bank has diversified among different applications of microcredit. In the Village Phone program, women entrepreneurs can start businesses to provide wireless payphone service in rural areas. This program earned the bank the 2004 Petersburg Prize, worth EUR 100,000, for its contribution of Technology to Development. In the press release announcing the prize, the Development Gateway Foundation noted that through this program:

... Grameen has created a new class of women entrepreneurs who have raised themselves from poverty. Moreover, it has improved the livelihoods of farmers and others who are provided access to critical market information and lifeline communications previously unattainable in some 28,000 villages of Bangladesh. More than 55,000 phones are currently in operation, with more than 80 million people benefiting from access to market information, news from relatives, and more.

=== Struggling members program ===
In 2003, Grameen Bank started a new program, different from its traditional group-based lending, exclusively targeted to the beggars in Bangladesh. This program is focused on distributing small loans to beggars.

=== Housing loans ===
In 1984, Grameen applied to the Central Bank for help setting up a housing loan program for its borrowers. Their application was rejected on the grounds that the US$125 suggested loan could not possibly build a suitable living structure. So, Grameen instead proposed the idea of "shelter loans". They were again rejected, this time on the grounds that their borrowers could not afford non-income generating loans. Grameen changed tactics and applied a third time, this time to make "factory loans", the explanation being that borrowers worked from home, so the home was also a factory that made it possible for borrowers to earn income. Grameen was rejected for a third time.

After this third rejection, Yunus, the bank's founder, met personally with the Central Bank governor to plead for their application. When asked if he thought the borrowers would repay the loans, he replied, "Yes, they will. They do. Unlike the rich, the poor cannot risk not repaying. This is the only chance they have." Grameen was then allowed to add housing loans to their range of services.

As of 1999, Grameen made housing loans totalling $190 million to build over 560,000 homes with near-perfect repayment. By 1989, their average housing loan had grown to $300. That year, the Grameen housing program received the Aga Khan International Award for Architecture.

== Operational statistics ==
Grameen Bank is owned by the borrowers of the bank, most of whom are poor women. Initially, of the total equity of the bank, the government owned 60% in 1983. This then dropped over time to a single-digit percentage by the early 2010s. However, by the mid-2010s, this number increased again to 25%.

The bank grew significantly between 2003 and 2007. As of January 2022, the total borrowers of the bank number nearly 9.5 million, and 96.81% of those are women. The number of borrowers has more than tripled since 2003, when the bank had 3.12 million members. Similar growth can be observed in the number of villages covered. As of October 2007, the Bank had a staff of more than 24,703 employees; its 2,468 branches provided services to 80,257 villages, up from the 43,681 villages covered in 2003. By the end of 2021, the bank's coverage expanded to 81,678 villages out of the country's total 87,223, for a national coverage rate of around 94%.

As of the end of 2021, cumulative loan disbursements since inception reached in excess of 2.5 trillion taka (US$33.767 billion), and the bank claims a loan recovery rate of around 95%. David Roodman has critiqued the accounting practices that Grameen used to determine this rate.

The global number of potential micro-borrowers is estimated to be 1 billion, with a total loan demand of $250 billion. The present microfinance model served 100 million people with $25 billion of loans as of the late 2000s.

== Staff training ==
The Grameen Bank staff often work in difficult conditions. Employees receive 6 months of on-the-job training, while shadowing qualified and experienced individuals from various branches of Grameen. The goal of this training is for the trainee to "appreciate the unexplored potential of the destitute" and to discover new ways to solve problems that arise within the Grameen branch. After completing the 6-month period, trainees return to Dhaka headquarters for review and critique before appointment to a bank branch.

== Honours ==
- In 1994, Grameen Bank received the Independence Day Award, which is the highest state award of Bangladesh.
- 13 October 2006, the Nobel Committee awarded Grameen Bank and its founder, Muhammad Yunus, the 2006 Nobel Peace Prize "for their efforts to create economic and social development from below." The award announcement also mentions that:

From modest beginnings three decades ago, Yunus has, first and foremost through Grameen Bank, developed micro-credit into an ever more important instrument in the struggle against poverty. Grameen Bank has been a source of ideas and models for the many institutions in the field of micro-credit that have sprung up around the world.

On 10 December 2006, Mosammat Taslima Begum, who used her first 16 euro (US$20) loan from the bank in 1992 to buy a goat and subsequently became a successful entrepreneur and one of the elected board members of the bank, accepted the Nobel Prize on behalf of Grameen Bank's investors and borrowers at the prize awarding ceremony held at Oslo City Hall.

Grameen Bank is the only business corporation to have won a Nobel Prize. Professor Ole Danbolt Mjøs, Chairman of the Norwegian Nobel Committee, in his speech, said that, by giving the prize to Grameen Bank and Muhammad Yunus, the Norwegian Nobel Committee wanted to encourage attention on achievements of the Muslim world, on the women's perspective, and on the fight against poverty.

Citizens of Bangladesh celebrated the prize. Some critics said that the award affirms neoliberalism.

== Related ventures ==
The Grameen Bank has grown into over two dozen enterprises of the Grameen Family of Enterprises. These organisations include Grameen Trust, Grameen Fund, Grameen Communications, Grameen Shakti (Grameen Energy), Grameen Telecom, Grameen Shikkha (Grameen Education), Grameen Motsho (Grameen Fisheries), Grameen Baybosa Bikash (Grameen Business Development), Grameen Phone, Grameen Software Limited, Grameen CyberNet Limited, Grameen Knitwear Limited, and Grameen Uddog (owner of the brand Grameen Check).

On 11 July 2005, the Grameen Mutual Fund One (GMFO), approved by the Securities and Exchange Commission of Bangladesh, was listed as an initial public offering. One of the first mutual funds of its kind, GMFO will allow the more than four million Grameen bank members, as well as non-members, to buy into Bangladesh's capital markets. The Bank and its constituents are together worth over US$7.4 billion.

The Grameen Foundation was developed to share the Grameen philosophy and expand the benefits of microfinance for the world's poorest people. Grameen Foundation, which has an A-rating from [Charity Watch], provides microloans in the USA (the only developed country where this is done), and supports microfinance institutions worldwide with loan guarantees, training, and technology transfer. As of 2008, Grameen Foundation supports microfinance institutions in the following regions:

- Asia-Pacific: Bangladesh, China, East Timor, Indonesia, India, Lebanon, Pakistan, Philippines, Saudi Arabia, Yemen
- Americas: Bolivia, Dominican Republic, El Salvador, Haiti, Honduras, Mexico, Peru, United States
- Africa: Cameroon, Egypt, Ethiopia, Ghana, Morocco, Nigeria, Rwanda, Tunisia, Uganda

From 2005, Grameen Bank worked on Mifos X, an open source technology framework for core banking solutions. Since 2011, Grameen Bank released this technology under the stewardship of Mifos Initiative, a US Non Profit organisation.

== Criticism ==
Some analysts have suggested that microcredit can bring communities into debt from which they cannot escape. Researchers have noted instances when microloans from the Grameen Bank were linked to exploitation and pressures on poor families to sell their belongings, leading in extreme cases to humiliation and ultimately suicides.

The Mises Institute's Jeffrey Tucker suggests that microcredit banks depend on subsidies to operate, thus acting as another example of welfare. Yunus believes that he is working against the subsidised economy, giving borrowers the opportunity to create businesses. Some of Tucker's criticism is based on his interpretation of Grameen's "16 decisions", seen as indoctrination, without considering what they mean in the context of illiterate peasants.

The Norwegian documentary Caught in Micro Debt claims that Grameen evaded taxes. The Spanish documentary Microcredit also suggested this. The accusation is based on the unauthorised transfer of approximately US$100 million, donated by the Norwegian Agency for Development Cooperation (Norad), from one Grameen entity to another in 1996, before the expiry of the Grameen Bank's tax exemption. However, Norad published a statement in December 2010 clearing Yunus and the Bank of any wrongdoing on this point, following a comprehensive review of Norad's support commissioned by the Minister of International Development.

Yunus denies that this is tax evasion:

There is no question of tax evasion here. The Government has provided organisations with opportunities; we have made use of these opportunities with [the] aim of benefitting our shareholders who are the rural poor women of Bangladesh.

David Roodman and Jonathan Morduch question the statistical validity of studies of microcredit's effects on poverty, noting the complexity of the situations involved. Yoolim Lee and Ruth David discuss how microfinance and the Grameen model in South India have in recent years been distorted by venture capitalism and profit-makers. In some cases, poor rural families have suffered debt spirals, harassment by microfinance debt collectors, and in some cases suicide.

Ethicist Peter Singer claims that microcredit has a limited ability to transform lives, and that other interventions are more effective.

== Representation in other media ==
- The film To Catch a Dollar (2010) documents the process of establishing Grameen America programs in Queens, New York, in 2008. It premiered at the 2010 Sundance Film Festival.
- The documentary film Living on One Dollar (2010) includes Grameen Bank providing microcredit to start small home businesses in a rural Guatemalan village.

== See also ==
- Accion International
- Acción Emprendedora
- Accion USA
- Cooperative banking
- Count Me In
- Flat rate (finance)
- Grama Vidiyal, Indian Microfinance Bank
- Islamic banking
- Kiva
- Micro credit for water supply and sanitation
- Microgrant
- Opportunity International
- Project Enterprise
