= Grameen check =

Type of clothing design in Bangladesh

Grameen check (Bengali: গ্রামীণ চেক gramin chek "rural plaid") is a type of clothing design in Bangladesh. It mainly constitutes a pattern of squares or rectangles formed from different colors of dyed threads. Clothes with grameen check designs are mainly made of cotton fabric woven in the traditional methods by the cottage-industry workers in Bangladesh. These types of clothes are very popular in Bangladesh because they are bright in color and comfortable to wear. It is marketed globally by 'Grameen Uddog'.

== History ==
Grameen check was pioneered by Grameen Bank founder and Nobel Peace Prize winner Dr. Muhammad Yunus. The clothes and the designs were products of the same small-industry weavers he helped through Grameen Bank.

== Economic impact on the manufacturers ==
Most of the fabric of grameen check comes directly from the traditional weavers of rural Bangladesh. The popularity of grameen check means that these small businesses are thriving and weavers (mostly from traditional weaver families) are earning money from the work they are good at, rather than having to migrate to towns and cities for other jobs.

Facebook Website Instagram
