= Franz Hermann Schulze-Delitzsch =

German politician and economist (1808–1883)

Hermann Schulze-Delitzsch
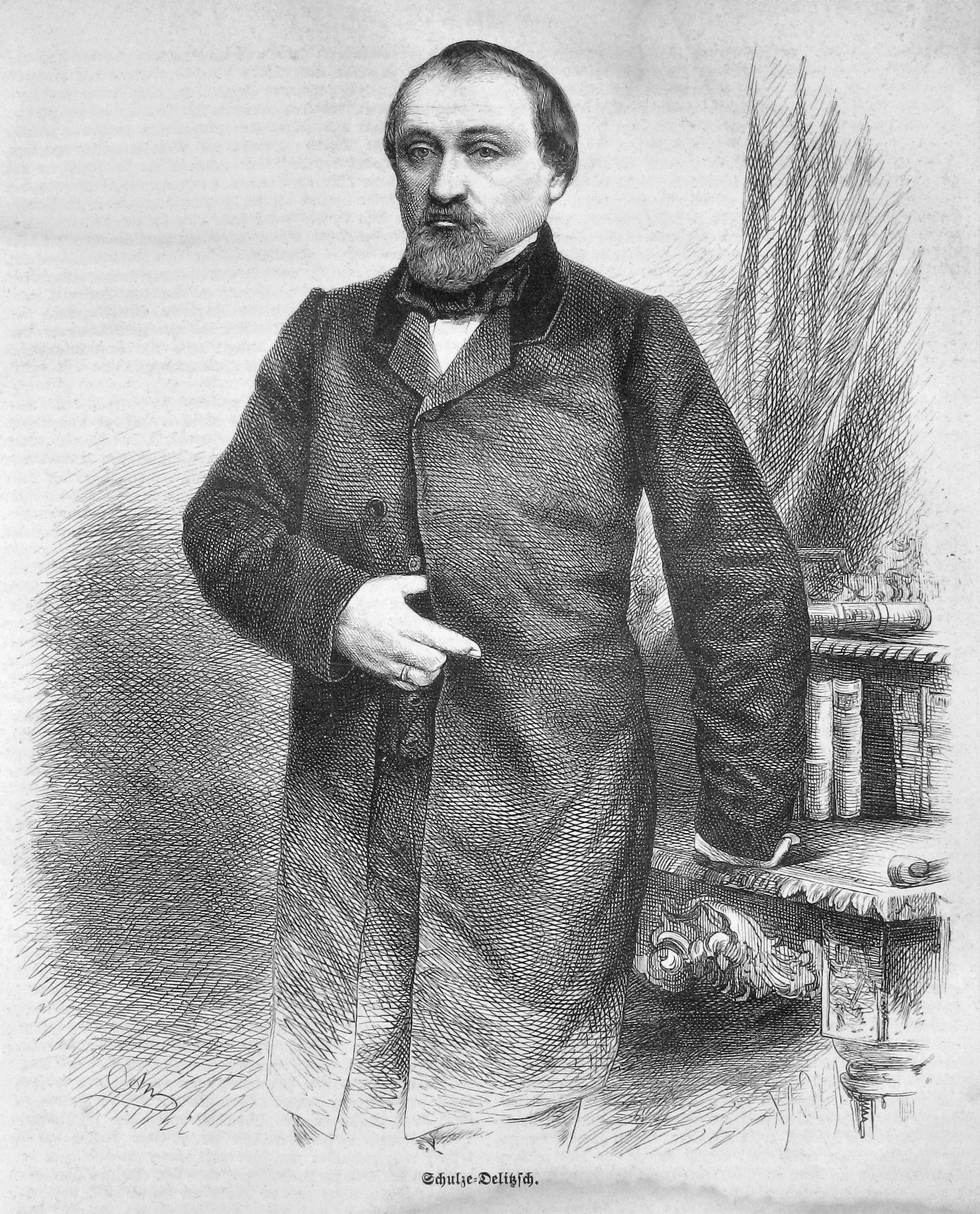
- Schulze-Delitzsch in 1863, Leipzig.
- Born: 29 August 1808; Delitzsch, Saxony
- Died: 29 April 1883 (aged 74); Potsdam, German Empire

Academic background
- Education: Leipzig University; Heidelberg University (Hc)
- Influences: Ferdinand Lassalle; Wilhelm Raiffeisen

Academic work
- Discipline: Microfinance; Microeconomics
- School or tradition: Co-operative economics
- Institutions: Prussian National Assembly, Reichstag
- Notable ideas: Credit Union; Bond of association Cooperative banking

Franz Hermann Schulze-Delitzsch, also Hermann Schulze, (29 August 1808 – 29 April 1883) was a German politician and economist. He was responsible for the organizing of the world's first credit unions. He was also co-founder of the German Progress Party.

== Biography ==
Schulze-Delitzsch was born at Delitzsch, in Saxony. He attended the St Nicholas School (Nikolaischule) in Leipzig and studied law at Leipzig and Halle universities and, when thirty, he became an assessor in the court of justice at Berlin. Three years later he was appointed patrimonial-richter at Delitzsch. Entering the parliament of 1848, he joined the Left Centre. At this time, his surname was expanded from Schulze to Schulze-Delitzsch: the name of his birthplace was appended to his surname to distinguish him from other Schulzes in the Prussian National Assembly. Acting as president of the commission of inquiry into the condition of the labourers and artisans, he became impressed with the necessity of co-operation to enable the smaller trades-people to hold their own against the capitalists.

He was a member of the Second Chamber in 1848-1849; but as matters ceased to run smoothly between himself and the high legal officials, he gave up his public appointments in October 1851, and withdrew to Delitzsch. Here he devoted himself to the organization and development of co-operation in Germany, and to the foundation of Vorschussvereine (peoples' banks), of which he had established the first at Delitzsch in 1850. These developed so rapidly that Schulze-Delitzsch in 1858, in Die arbeitenden Klassen und das Assoziationswesen in Deutschland, enumerated twenty-five as already in existence. In these banks, the subscribers made small deposits, obtaining proportional credit and dividends. The management was vested in a board composed of subscribers.

In 1859 the more than 200 such banks were centrally organized under the direction of Schulze-Delitzsch. He promoted the first Genossenschaftstag, a co-operative meeting, in Weimar, and founded a central bureau of co-operative societies.

In 1861 he again entered the Prussian Chamber, and became a prominent member of the Progressist party. In 1863 he devoted the chief portion of a testimonial, amounting to $1,165,567.43 in today's money, to the maintenance of his co-operative institutions and offices. This, however, was only to meet an exceptional outlay, for he always insisted that they must be self-supporting. The next three or four years were given to the formation of local centres, and the establishment of the Deutsche Genossenschafts-Bank, 1865.

The spread of these organizations naturally led to legislation on the subject, and this too was chiefly the work of Schulze-Delitzsch. As a member of the Chamber in 1867 he was mainly instrumental in passing the Prussian law of association, which was extended to the North German Confederation in 1868, and later to the empire. Schulze-Delitzsch also contributed to uniformity of legislation throughout the states of Germany, in 1869, by the publication of Die Gesetzgebung über die privatrechtliche Stellung der Erwerbs- und Wirthschaftsgenossenschaften, etc.

With the legislation in place, his life's work was complete; he had placed the advantages of capital and co-operation within the reach of struggling tradesmen throughout Germany. His remaining years were spent in consolidating this work. He endeavored to accustom the people to rely upon their own initiative to improve their condition, and declared that the function of the state should be limited to assuring industrial and personal liberty.

Both as a writer and a member of the Reichstag his industry was incessant, and he died in harness on 29 April 1883 at Potsdam, leaving the reputation of a benefactor to the smaller tradesmen and artisans, in which light he must be regarded rather than as the founder of true co-operative principles in Germany. At the time of his death, there were in Germany alone 3,500 co-operative banking branches with more than $100,000,000 in deposits, while the system had been extended to Austria, Italy, Belgium and Russia. His work was noteworthy enough to attain mention in Leo Tolstoy's novel, Anna Karenina.

== Gallery ==
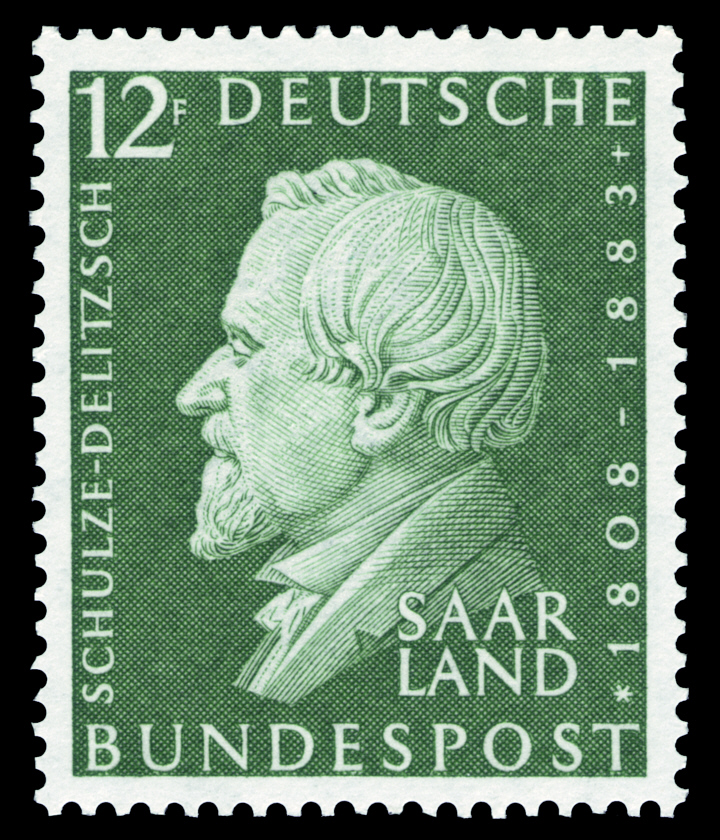
Stamp commemorating Schulze-Delitzsch's 150th birthday.

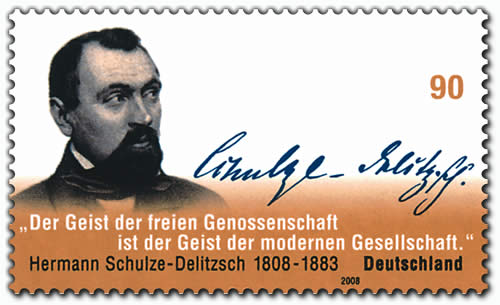
German stamp commemorating Schulze's 200th birthday.

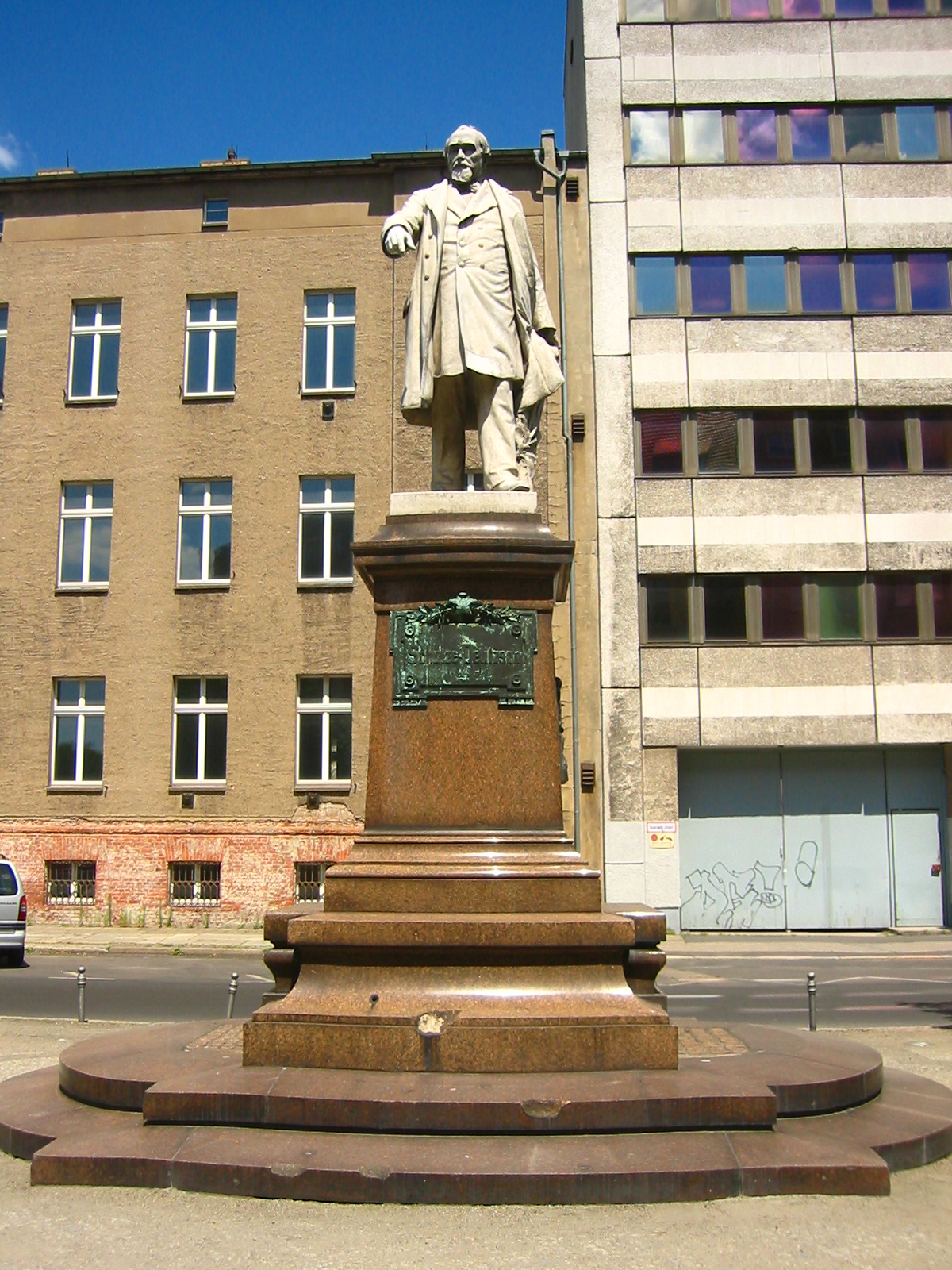
Memorial for Schulze-Delitzsch in downtown Berlin.

== See also ==
- Bond of association
- Friedrich Wilhelm Raiffeisen
- History of credit unions
