= Sandra Rotman =

Canadian philanthropist

Sandra Ann Rotman
- Born: Sandra Frieberg; 10 May 1938 (age 87); Toronto, Ontario, Canada
- Occupation(s): Teacher, canadian philanthropist
- Spouse: Joseph Louis Rotman
- Children: Janis, Kenneth

Sandra Ann Rotman, CM OOnt, is a Canadian philanthropist and community leader.

== Overview ==
She and her late husband, Joseph Rotman (O.C., LL.D), frequently directed their philanthropy to support Canadian institutions in the arts, health care and education. Over the course of 20 years, the Rotmans served on many boards and donated more than $90 million to charities.

In 2006, Sandra Rotman was honored with the Order of ontario, and in 2007 was awarded an honorary LL.D. from the University of Toronto.

== Community work ==
Sandra Rotman has served on the boards of several Canadian institutions in the arts, health and education:

- Vice Chair – Rotman CAMH Social Enterprise Development / Rise Asset Development 2011–present
- Vice Chair – Ontario Heritage Foundation 1998–2004
- Board of Trustees – University Health Network 1998–2008
- board of directors, Art Gallery of Ontario 2004–present
- Sotheby's Canada International Advisory Board 2002–present
- Canadian Friends of the Israel Museum – Honorary Chair 1990–present
- Contemporary Curatorial Committee, Art Gallery of Ontario 1985–2000
- board of directors, Toronto International Film Festival 1989–1998
- board of directors, National Ballet of Canada 1987–1993

== Health and life sciences ==
Rotman is a long-standing supporter of health institutions in Canada. The Rotmans supported the Baycrest Centre for Geriatric Care, which researches aging and dementia, in Toronto for close to three decades. In 1989, they established the Rotman Research Institute to study cognitive neuroscience and to translate the most recent research directly to benefit patients. Also at Baycrest, she created the Sandra A. Rotman Program in Neuropsychiatry.

For more than two decades, Sandra Rotman has been a contributor to the University Health Network in downtown Toronto as a board member and a donor.

Established by both University Health Network and the University of Toronto, the Sandra Rotman Centre focuses on global health through translational research on malaria, through ethics, social and cultural research. The centre hosts the Grand Challenges Canada federally funded program. The University of Toronto also hosts the Sandra Rotman Chair in Health Sector Strategy and the Rotman School of Management.

Rotman is an advocate of mental health issues. After being treated for anxiety, she worked with the Rotman School of Management to create Rise Asset Development in 2009. Rise Asset Development provides free business mentoring and the Centre for Addiction and Mental Health for health supports, providing assistance to entrepreneurs living with mental illness and addictions.

== Arts ==
Sandra Rotman is a major benefactor to the National Ballet of Canada, the Art Gallery of Ontario, the Canadian Opera Company, the Israel Museum, the Toronto Symphony and the Toronto International Film Festival. She also founded the Louis Applebaum Visitorship in Film Composition at the University Of Toronto School of Music.

Sandra and Joseph Rotman helped to found the Elinor and Lou Siminovitch Prize in Theater, an annual award where the winning Laureate receives $75,000 and selects an emerging artist to receive a $25,000 Protégé Prize.

== Education and honours ==
Rotman attended Toronto Teachers College, graduating in 1958. In 1960–61, she studied Fine Arts at Barnard College in New York. She continued her studies at the University of Toronto, receiving her BA in 1975.

In 2006, Rotman was created a member of the Order of Ontario, and in 2007 she was awarded an honorary LL.D. by the University of Toronto.

In advance of the 2010 Vancouver Olympic Games, the Rotmans were selected to be torchbearers for the Vancouver 2010 Olympic Torch Run in Toronto on 17 December 2009.

The Rotmans received the Outstanding Philanthropists Award from The Association of Fundraising Professionals in 2009.

In 2010, the Rotmans received the Beth Sholom Brotherhood Humanitarian Award.

In 2013, she was made a Member of the Order of Canada "for her leadership in support of health care and the arts, notably as a driver of initiatives in global and mental health".

== Personal life ==
She married Joseph L. Rotman in 1959; they have two children, Janis and Kenneth. She lives in Toronto, Canada.
