= Spark MicroGrants =

U.S. charity

- Company type: Non-profit organization
- Industry: International development
- Founded: July 2010
- Headquarters: Kampala, Uganda
- Key people: Sasha Fisher (Founder)
- Website: www.sparkmicrogrants.org

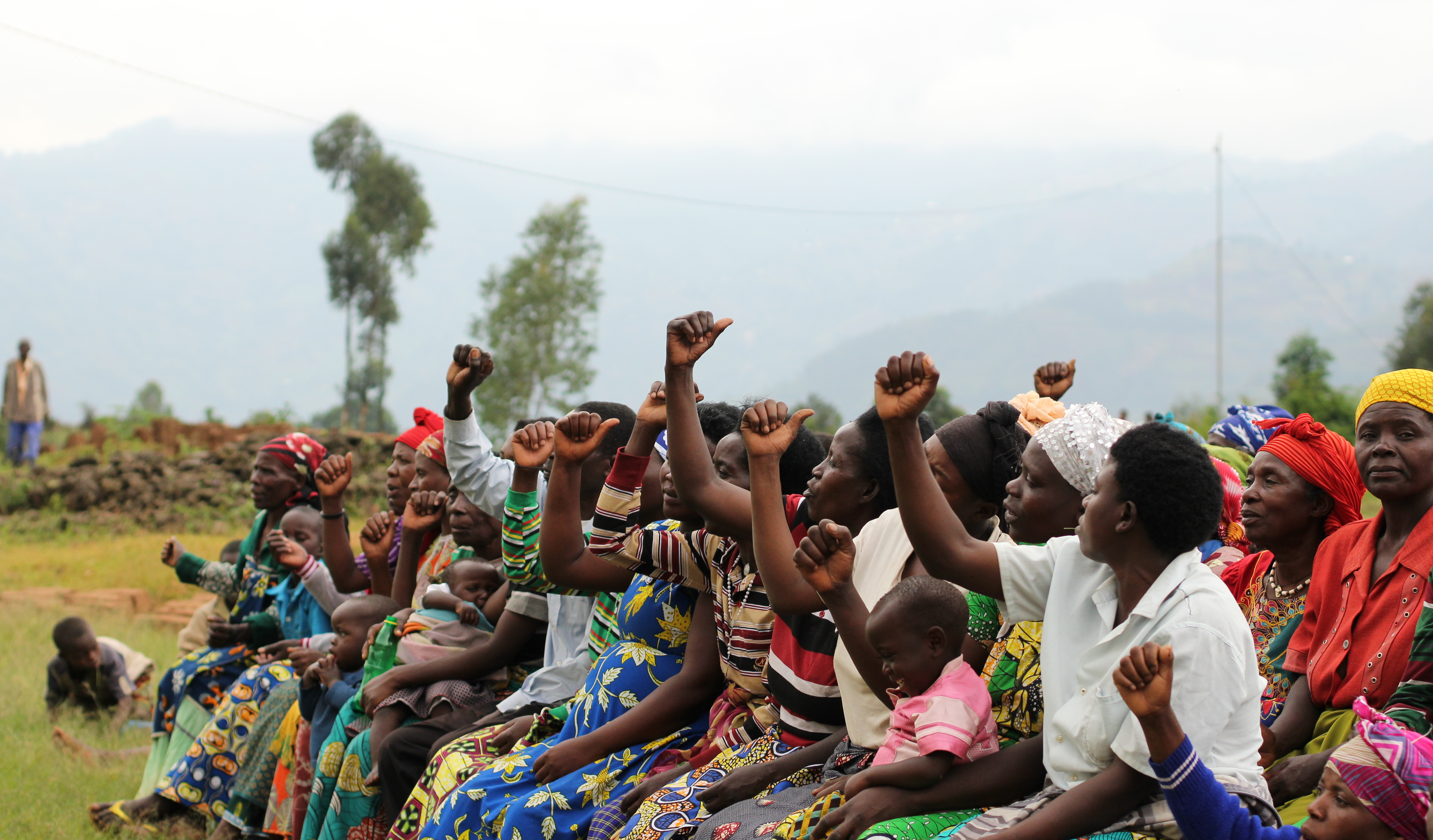
A Spark community in Rwanda begins their meeting.

Spark MicroGrants is a 501(c)(3) non-profit organization that focuses on helping communities to organize and make progress, they work primarily in East Africa.

== History ==
Spark MicroGrants has worked to put families facing poverty as the driving seat of local change since July 2010. Spark’s key innovation is the Facilitated Collective Action Process (FCAP), in which a series of curated village meetings are held paired with a seed grant. In these meetings, impoverished families in villages plan and launch initiatives that range from schools to farms.

On average, 64 women and men, young and old, work and take action together. Since 2010, Spark has enabled over 170 villages to drive change through the FCAP across five countries. FCAP achieved 91% project sustainability and 94% of villages continue the process, meeting and taking action.

Today Spark curates the community of practices to elevate the FCAP and support networks around the globe to use and develop the FCAP for their contexts. Such as the Government of Rwanda on a national decentralization program, a legal empowerment network in West Africa and a progressive refugee integration strategy in Uganda.

Spark MicroGrants began its work in Rwanda in 2010. Today the Spark process is used across Rwanda, Uganda, Burundi, Ghana and the Democratic Republic of Congo.

Spark has been touted as an organization that will transform aid distributed to people and build a world with dignity.

== Board of directors ==
- Sasha Fisher, Executive Director
- Andy Bryant, Executive Director of the Segal Family Foundation
- Allison Devore
- Tom Fry
- Jonathan Jackson, Chief Executive Officer of Dimagi
- Stacey Faella
- Sandra Wijnberg
- Kara Weiss

== Media coverage ==
In 2011, Spark MicroGrants was featured in Forbes magazine and was a semi-finalist in the Buckminster Fuller Challenge.

== Statistics ==
Spark MicroGrant's model has been used to support 160+ community partners across Rwanda, Uganda, Burundi, the Democratic Republic of the Congo, and Ghana to launch local projects, with the support of foundations and private donors.

== See also ==
- Social entrepreneurship
- Community mobilization
- Community organizing
- Local development
- Community-driven development
