= Microcredit =

Small loans to impoverished borrowers

Microcredit is the extension of very small loans (microloans) to borrowers with limited access to traditional credit who typically do not have access to traditional banking services due to a lack of collateral, steady employment, and a verifiable credit history. The primary aim of microcredit is to support entrepreneurship, facilitate self-employment, and alleviate poverty, particularly in low-income communities.

The United Nations designated 2005 as the International Year of Microcredit to raise awareness of microfinance as a strategy for poverty reduction and financial inclusion. By the early 2010s, microcredit had expanded significantly across developing countries, with estimates suggesting that more than 200 million people were beneficiaries of microcredit services worldwide.

While widely adopted, the effectiveness of microcredit remains debated, with mixed evidence on its long-term impact on poverty alleviation. Some studies have indicated that while microcredit can increase business activity, it has limited effects on household income, education, and health outcomes. Critics argue that microcredit may contribute to over-indebtedness and perpetuate financial instability for some borrowers.

== History ==
While the term "microcredit" gained prominence in the late 20th century, the practice of offering small loans to the poor has earlier roots. In the 18th century, Jonathan Swift, the Anglo-Irish satirist and Dean of St. Patrick's Cathedral in Dublin, established a charitable loan fund in 1727 with £500 of his own money. This fund provided small, interest-free loans to impoverished tradespeople, requiring borrowers to have two neighbors act as guarantors, thereby ensuring community accountability. Swift's initiative inspired the creation of similar loan funds across Ireland, which, at their peak in the 19th century, provided credit to approximately 20% of Irish households. These early efforts laid the groundwork for later institutional models of microfinance.

Additional early examples of small-scale lending emerged throughout the 18th and 19th centuries. In 1746, John Wesley, the founder of Methodism, created a lending stock for the poor in England. His journal on January 17 1748 records:

I made a public collection toward a lending stock for the poor. Our rule is, to lend only twenty shillings at once, which is repaid weekly within three months. I began this about a year and a half ago: thirty pounds sixteen shillings were then collected; and out of this, no less than two hundred and fifty-five persons have been relieved in eighteen months.

In the mid-19th century, Lysander Spooner, an American legal theorist, argued that access to small loans could enable the poor to become self-reliant entrepreneurs. Around the same time in Germany, Friedrich Wilhelm Raiffeisen founded the first cooperative rural credit unions to provide affordable credit to farmers, laying the foundation for the global credit union movement.

=== Modern microcredit ===
The institutionalization of microcredit in its contemporary form began in the 1970s, with Bangladesh serving as a central hub for early development. In 1983, Muhammad Yunus established the Grameen Bank, which is widely regarded as the first modern microcredit institution. Yunus began the project in Jobra, using his own funds to deliver small loans at low-interest rates to the rural poor. The Grameen model introduced a group-based lending system aimed at reducing risk through peer accountability and promoting financial inclusion for low-income borrowers, particularly women.

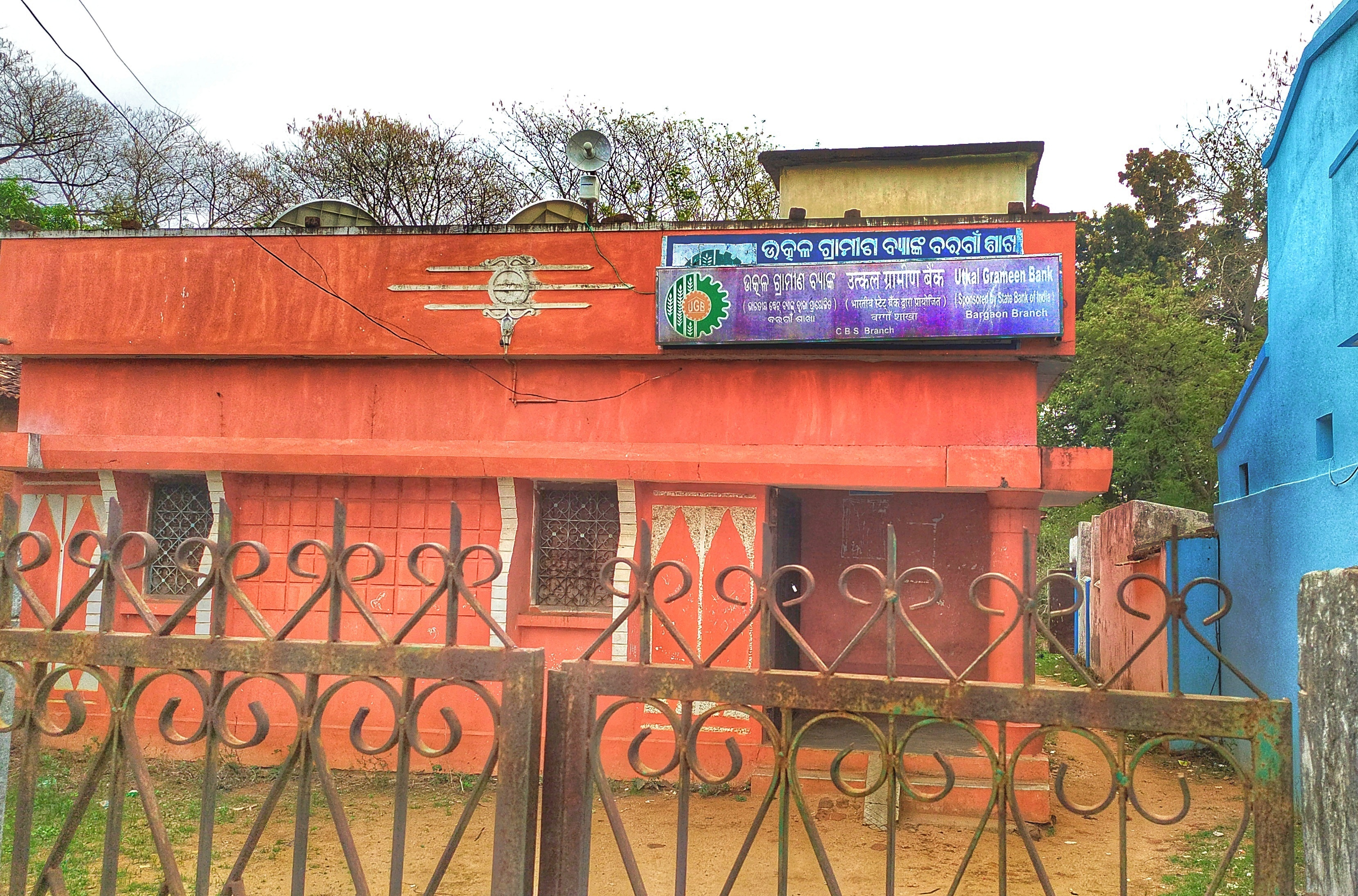
State-funded Utkal Grameen Bank in Bargaon, Odisha.

The Grameen Bank model inspired the creation of similar institutions globally, including BRAC in 1972 and ASA in 1978 in Bangladesh, and PRODEM in Bolivia, which later became the for-profit BancoSol in 1986. Simultaneously, savings and credit cooperatives, organized in regional associations under the aegis of the World Council of Credit Unions (WOCCU), were establishing and promoting access at the grassroots level to small amounts of credit throughout West Africa and Latin America. In Chile, BancoEstado Microempresas became a major provider of microcredit services. Though the Grameen Bank was formed initially as a non-profit organization dependent upon government subsidies, it later became a corporate entity and was renamed Grameen II in 2002. Yunus and Grameen Bank were awarded the Nobel Peace Prize in 2006 combinedly for their "efforts to create economic and social development from below".

== Principles ==
=== Economic principles ===
Microcredit organizations were initially created as alternatives to the "loan sharks" known to take advantage of clients. Indeed, many microlenders began as non-profit organizations and operated with government funds or private subsidies. By the 1980s, however, the "financial systems approach", influenced by neoliberalism and propagated by the Harvard Institute for International Development, became the dominant ideology among microcredit organizations. The neoliberal model of microcredit can also be referred to as the institutionalist model, which promotes applying market solutions as a viable way to address social problems. The commercialization of microcredit officially began in 1984 with the formation of Unit Desa (BRI-UD) within the Bank Rakyat Indonesia. Unit Desa offered 'kupedes' microloans based on market interest rates.

Yunus has sharply criticized the shift in microcredit organizations from the Grameen Bank model as a non-profit bank to for-profit institutions:

I never dreamed that one day microcredit would give rise to its own breed of loan sharks... There are always people eager to take advantage of the vulnerable. But credit programs that seek to profit from the suffering of the poor should not be described as "microcredit," and investors who own such programs should not be allowed to benefit from the trust and respect that microcredit banks have rightly earned.

Many microcredit organizations now function as independent banks. This has led to their charging higher interest rates on loans and placing more emphasis on savings programs. Notably, Unit Desa has charged in excess of 20 percent on small business loans. The application of neoliberal economics to microcredit has generated much debate among scholars and development practitioners, with some claiming that microcredit bank directors, such as Muhammad Yunus, apply the practices of loan sharks for their personal enrichment. Indeed, the academic debate foreshadowed a Wall-street style scandal involving the Mexican microcredit organization Compartamos.

Even so, the numbers indicate that ethical microlending and investor profit can go hand-in-hand. In the 1990s a rural finance minister in Indonesia showed how Unit Desa could lower its rates by about 8% while still bringing attractive returns to investors.

=== Group lending ===
Though early microcredit institutions such as Jobra and Grameen Bank initially focused on individual lending, group lending approaches to microcredit were present as early as the 1970s through the use of solidarity circles. These groups provide one another with mutual encouragement, information, and assistance in times of need, though loans remain the responsibility of individuals. The use of group-lending was motivated by economics of scale, as the costs associated with monitoring loans and enforcing repayment are significantly lower when credit is distributed to groups rather than individuals. Often, the loan to one participant in group-lending depends upon the successful repayment from another member, thus transferring repayment responsibility off of microcredit institutions to loan recipients.

=== Blockchain micro-lending ===
Blockchain micro-lending refers to the use of open-source distributed ledger systems and smart contracts to issue and manage small loans without traditional financial intermediaries. The model is commonly discussed as part of decentralized finance (DeFi) or microfinance and is proposed as a way to reduce transaction costs, increase transparency, and expand access to credit in underserved communities and countries that are underbanked and unbanked.

=== Lending to women ===
Microcredit is a tool that can possibly be helpful to reduce the feminization of poverty in developing countries. Lending to women has become an important principle in microcredit, with banks and NGOs such as BancoSol, WWB, and Pro Mujer catering to women exclusively. Pro Mujer also implemented a new strategy to combine microcredits with health-care services, since the health of their clients is crucial to the success of microcredits. Though Grameen Bank initially tried to lend to both men and women at equal rates, women presently make up ninety-five percent of the bank's clients. Women continue to make up seventy-five percent of all microcredit recipients worldwide. Exclusive lending to women began in the 1980s when Grameen Bank found that women have higher repayment rates, and tend to accept smaller loans than men.

== Examples ==
=== Bangladesh ===
Grameen Bank in Bangladesh is the oldest and probably best-known microfinance institution in the world. Grameen Bank launched their US operations in New York in April 2008. Bank of America has announced plans to award more than $3.7 million in grants to nonprofits to use in backing microloan programs. The Accion U.S. Network, the US subsidiary of the better-known Accion International, has provided over $450 million in microloans since 1991, with an over 90% repayment rate. One research study of the Grameen model shows that poorer individuals are safer borrowers because they place more value on the relationship with the bank. Even so, efforts to replicate Grameen-style solidarity lending in developed countries have generally not succeeded. For example, the Calmeadow Foundation tested an analogous peer-lending model in three locations in Canada during the 1990s. It concluded that a variety of factors—including difficulties in reaching the target market, the high risk profile of clients, their general distaste for the joint liability requirement, and high overhead costs—made solidarity lending unviable without subsidies. Microcredits have also been introduced in Israel, Russia, Ukraine and other nations where micro-loans help small business entrepreneurs overcome cultural barriers in the mainstream business society. The Israel Free Loan Association (IFLA) has lent more than $100 million in the past two decades to Israeli citizens of all backgrounds.

=== India ===
In India, the National Bank for Agriculture and Rural Development (NABARD) finances more than 500 banks that on-lend funds to self-help groups (SHGs). SHGs comprise twenty or fewer members, of whom the majority are women from the poorest castes and tribes. Members save small amounts of money, as little as a few rupees a month in a group fund. Members may borrow from the group fund for a variety of purposes ranging from household emergencies to school fees. As SHGs prove capable of managing their funds well, they may borrow from a local bank to invest in small business or farm activities. Banks typically lend up to four rupees for every rupee in the group fund. In Asia borrowers generally pay interest rates that range from 30% to 70% without commission and fees. Nearly 1.4 million SHGs comprising approximately 20 million women now borrow from banks, which makes the Indian SHG-Bank Linkage model the largest microfinance program in the world. Similar programs are evolving in Africa and Southeast Asia with the assistance of organizations like IFAD, Opportunity International, Catholic Relief Services, Compassion International, CARE, APMAS, Oxfam, Tearfund and World Vision.

=== Pakistan ===
Microcredit initiatives in Pakistan have developed significantly over the past several decades, evolving from early cooperative lending models to large-scale institutional frameworks. The first major microcredit initiative in the region was the Comilla Model, introduced in the 1950s by Akhtar Hameed Khan in East Pakistan (now Bangladesh). The Comilla Model was designed to address rural poverty through group-based lending and village cooperatives, aiming to empower small farmers by providing access to credit without traditional collateral. While the model initially showed promise, it faced challenges due to bureaucratic interference, mismanagement, and power imbalances within borrower groups, ultimately limiting its long-term impact.

Following the separation of Bangladesh in 1971, microcredit efforts in Pakistan evolved independently, influenced by both global microfinance trends and local economic conditions. In 2001, the establishment of Akhuwat marked a significant shift in microcredit philosophy within Pakistan. Founded by Amjad Saqib, Akhuwat operates on a unique interest-free lending model funded entirely by donations and community support. The organization disburses loans to low-income borrowers through a network of mosques and community centers, promoting principles of social justice and financial inclusion. Akhuwat has provided over PKR 200 billion in interest-free loans to more than 4.5 million families as of 2024, positioning itself as one of the largest microfinance institutions in the country.

Akhuwat’s success has been attributed to its emphasis on community engagement and its rejection of interest-based lending, aligning its model with both Islamic finance principles and conventional microcredit structures. Borrowers are required to repay only the principal amount, fostering a culture of mutual support and accountability. Akhuwat also offers social services such as educational scholarships, housing loans, and small business training to further enhance economic stability among beneficiaries.

Microcredit initiatives in Pakistan have developed significantly over the past several decades, transitioning from cooperative lending models to formalized institutional frameworks. While Akhuwat is a notable example of interest-free microfinance, other organizations have also contributed to the sector.

Kashf Foundation, established in 1996, was one of the first microfinance institutions in Pakistan to focus on women’s economic empowerment through microloans. The organization has expanded its services to include microinsurance and financial literacy programs.

Khushhali Microfinance Bank (KMBL), founded in 2000 as part of the Microfinance Sector Development Program, provides microloans, agricultural credit, and digital banking services. KMBL operates as a for-profit institution and focuses on small business lending.

The National Rural Support Programme (NRSP), launched in 1991, is the largest rural development initiative in Pakistan. NRSP offers microloans alongside agricultural training and infrastructure development for low-income households.

The Pakistan Poverty Alleviation Fund (PPAF), established in 2000, functions as an apex institution that allocates funds to partner organizations involved in poverty reduction through microcredit, asset transfers, and community-based projects.

Despite the expansion of microcredit in Pakistan, challenges such as operational costs, outreach in remote areas, and regulatory constraints remain prevalent.

=== United States ===
In the United States, microcredit has generally been defined as loans of less than $50,000 to people—mostly entrepreneurs—who cannot, for various reasons, borrow from a bank. Most nonprofit microlenders include services like financial literacy training and business plan consultations, which contribute to the expense of providing such loans but also, those groups say, to the success of their borrowers. One such organization in the United States, the Accion U.S. Network is a nonprofit microfinance organization headquartered in New York, New York. It is the largest and only nationwide nonprofit microfinance network in the US. The Accion U.S. Network is part of Accion International, a US-based nonprofit organization operating globally, with the mission of giving people the financial tools they need to create or grow healthy businesses. The domestic Accion programs started in Brooklyn, New York, and grew from there to become the first nationwide network microlender. US microcredit programs have helped many poor but ambitious borrowers to improve their lot. The Aspen Institute's study of 405 microentrepreneurs indicates that more than half of the loan recipients escaped poverty within five years. On average, their household assets grew by nearly $16,000 during that period; the group's reliance on public assistance dropped by more than 60%. Several corporate sponsors including Citi Foundation and Capital One launched Grameen America in New York. Since then the financial outfit—not bank—has been serving the poor, mainly women, throughout four of the city's five boroughs (Bronx, Brooklyn, Manhattan, and Queens) as well as Omaha, Nebraska and Indianapolis, Indiana. In four years, Grameen America has facilitated loans to over 9,000 borrowers valued over $35 million. It has had, as Grameen CEO Stephen Vogel notes, "a 99 percent repayment rate".

=== Peer-to-peer lending over the Web ===
The principles of microcredit have also been applied in attempting to address several non-poverty-related issues. Among these, multiple Internet-based organizations have developed platforms that facilitate a modified form of peer-to-peer lending where a loan is not made in the form of a single, direct loan, but as the aggregation of a number of smaller loans—often at a negligible interest rate.

Examples of platforms that connect lenders to micro-entrepreneurs via Internet are Kiva, Zidisha, and the Microloan Foundation. Another internet-based microlender, United Prosperity (now defunct), uses a variation on the usual microlending model; with United Prosperity the micro-lender provides a guarantee to a local bank which then lends back double that amount to the micro-entrepreneur. United Prosperity claims this provides both greater leverage and allows the micro-entrepreneur to develop a credit history with their local bank for future loans. In 2009, the US-based nonprofit Zidisha became the first peer-to-peer microlending platform to link lenders and borrowers directly across international borders without local intermediaries. From 2008 through 2014, Vittana allowed peer-to-peer lending for student loans in developing countries.

== Impact of microcredit ==
The impact of microcredit is a subject of some controversy. Proponents state that it reduces poverty through higher employment and higher incomes. This is expected to lead to improved nutrition and improved education of the borrowers' children. Some argue that microcredit empowers women. In the US, UK and Canada, it is argued that microcredit helps recipients to graduate from welfare programs.

Critics say that microcredit, if not carefully directed, may not increase incomes, and may drive poor households into a debt trap. They add that the money from loans may be used for durable consumer goods or consumption instead of being used for productive investments, that it may fail to empower women, and that it may not improve health or education.

The available evidence indicates that in many cases microcredit has facilitated the creation and growth of businesses. It has often generated self-employment, but it has not necessarily increased incomes after interest payments. In some cases it has driven borrowers into debt traps. Some studies suggest that microcredit has not generally empowered women. Microcredit has achieved much less than what its proponents said it would achieve, but its negative impacts have not been as drastic as some critics have argued. Microcredit is just one factor influencing the success of a small businesses, whose success is influenced to a much larger extent by how much an economy or a particular market grows.

Unintended consequences of microfinance include informal intermediation: some entrepreneurial borrowers may become informal intermediaries between microfinance initiatives and poorer micro-entrepreneurs. Those who more easily qualify for microfinance may split loans into smaller credit to even poorer borrowers. Informal intermediation ranges from casual intermediaries at the good or benign end of the spectrum to loan sharks at the professional and sometimes criminal end of the spectrum.

== Improvement ==
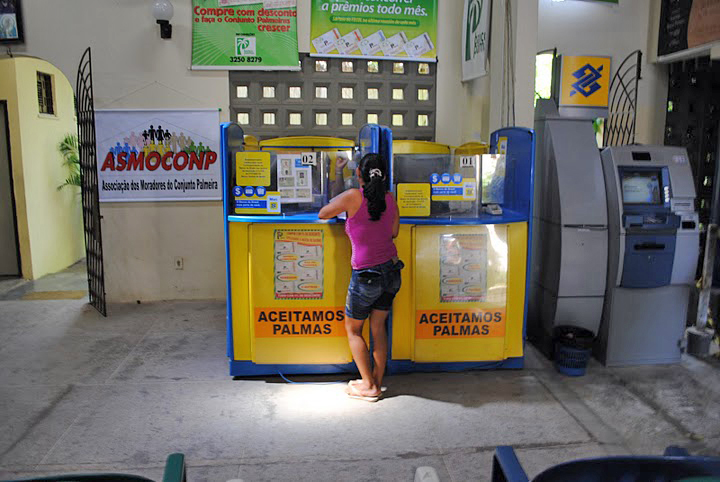
Many microfinance institutions also offer savings facilities, such as Banco Palma in Brazil, shown here.

Many scholars and practitioners suggest an integrated package of services ("a credit-plus" approach) rather than just providing credits. When access to credit is combined with savings facilities, non-productive loan facilities, insurance, enterprise development (production-oriented and management training, marketing support) and welfare-related services (literacy and health services, gender and social awareness training), the adverse effects discussed above can be diminished. Some argue that more experienced entrepreneurs who are getting loans should be qualified for bigger loans to ensure the success of the program.

One of the main challenges of microcredit is providing small loans at an affordable cost. The global average interest and fee rate is estimated at 37%, with rates reaching as high as 70% in some markets. The reason for the high interest rates is not primarily cost of capital. Indeed, the local microfinance organizations that receive zero-interest loan capital from the online microlending platform Kiva charge average interest and fee rates of 35.21%. Rather, the principal reason for the high cost of microcredit loans is the high transaction cost of traditional microfinance operations relative to loan size. Microcredit practitioners have long argued that such high interest rates are simply unavoidable. The result is that the traditional approach to microcredit has made only limited progress in resolving the problem it purports to address: that the world's poorest people pay the world's highest cost for small business growth capital. The high costs of traditional microcredit loans limit their effectiveness as a poverty-fighting tool. Borrowers who do not manage to earn a rate of return at least equal to the interest rate may actually end up poorer as a result of accepting the loans. According to a recent survey of microfinance borrowers in Ghana published by the Center for Financial Inclusion, more than one-third of borrowers surveyed reported struggling to repay their loans. In recent years, microcredit providers have shifted their focus from the objective of increasing the volume of lending capital available, to address the challenge of providing microfinance loans more affordably. Analyst David Roodman contends that in mature markets, the average interest and fee rates charged by microfinance institutions tend to fall over time.

== See also ==
- Cooperative banking
- Count Me In (charity)
- Crowdfunding
- Crowd sourcing
- Decentralized finance
- Flat rate (finance)
- Microcredit for water supply and sanitation
- Microgrant
- M-Pesa
- Payday loan
- Project Enterprise
- Solidarity lending
- The Women's Development Bank
- Oikocredit
