= Flat rate (finance) =

Calculating loan repayments based only on the amount initially loaned

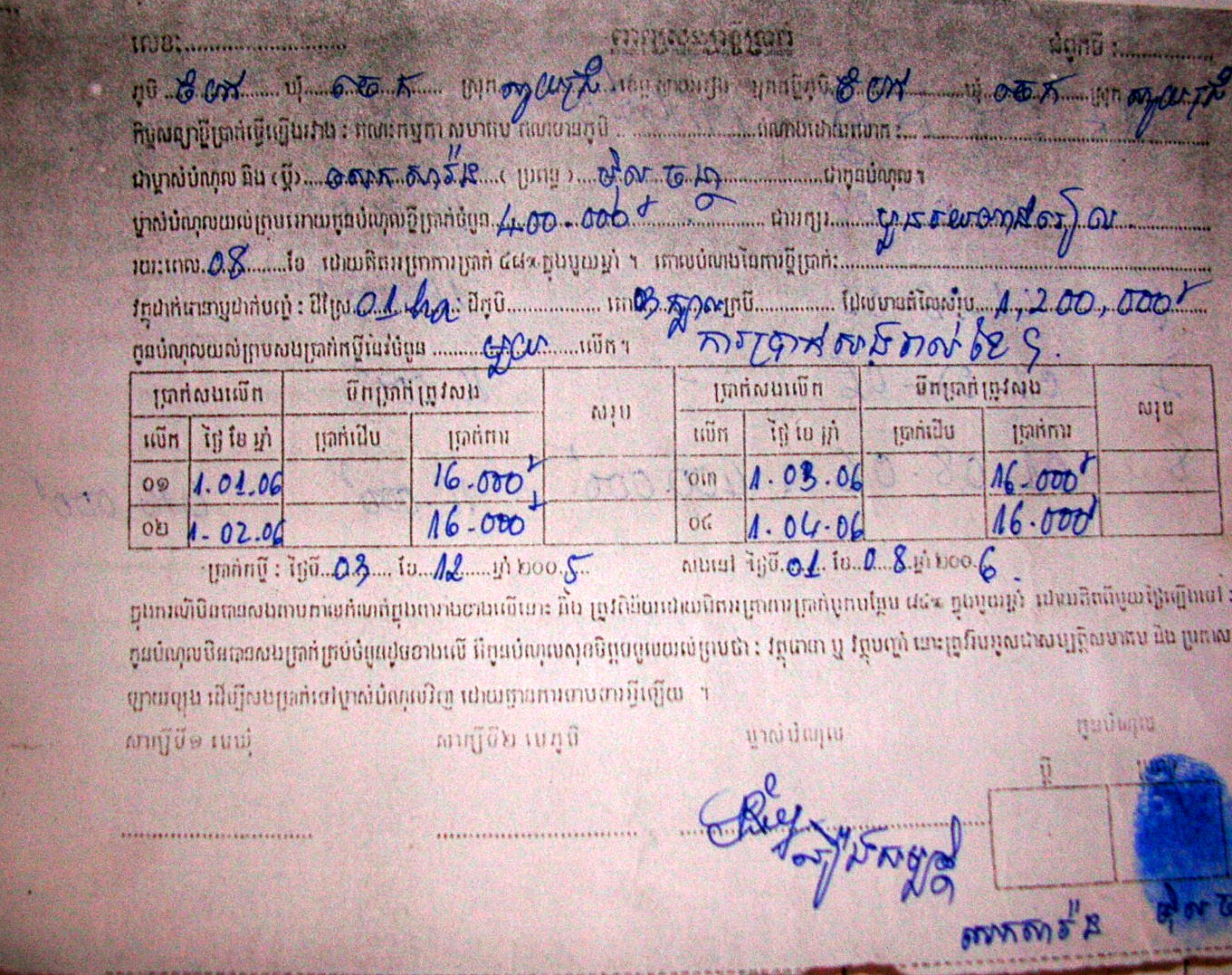
Loan contract with flat rate calculation, rural Cambodia.

In accounting and finance, flat interest rate mortgages and loans calculate interest based on the amount of money a borrower receives at the beginning of the loan. However, if repayment is scheduled to occur at regular intervals throughout the term, the average amount to which the borrower has access is lower and so the effective or true rate of interest is higher. Only if the principal is available in full throughout the loan term does the flat rate equate to the true rate. This is the case in the example to the right, where the loan contract is for 400,000 Cambodian riels over 4 months. Interest is set at 16,000 riels (4%) a month while principal is due in a single payment at the end.

== Flat rate calculations ==
Flat interest example

Flat interest APR

Loans with interest quoted using a flat rate originated before currency was invented and continued to feature regularly up to and beyond the 20th century within developed countries. More recently, they have also come to be used in the informal economy of developing countries, frequently adopted by microcredit institutions. One reason for the popularity of flat rates is their ease of use. For example, a loan of $1,200 can be structured with 12 monthly repayments of $100, plus interest, due on the same dates, of 1% ($12) a month, resulting in a total monthly payment of $112. However, the borrower only has access to $1,200 at the very beginning of the loan. Since $100 in principal is being paid each month, the average amount to which the borrower has access during the loan term is approximately half, in fact just over $600. For this reason, as mentioned above, the true rate of interest is nearly double. "A general rule known by financial managers is that when flat interest is used, the APR is almost twice as much as the quoted interest rate."

In order to show the true rate underlying a flat rate, it is necessary to use the declining balance amortization schedule, dividing the total cost to the borrower by the average amount outstanding. In the first three examples on the right the borrower is quoted 1% a month. These are loans of $1,200 each, amortized with level payments over 4, 12 and 24 months. In the 4-month example, the borrower will make four equal payments of $300 in principal and 4 equal payments of $12 (1% of $1,200) in interest. The total cost of this loan is the principal plus $48.00 in interest, whilst the average amount outstanding was approximately $600. This yields an annualized flat rate of 12%, and an annualized effective or true rate of 19.05%. The true rate can also be calculated by iteration from the amortization schedule, using the compound interest formula.

To keep quoted interest rates as low as possible, institutions also often call for one-time origination or administration fees. However, an origination fee as low as 4% of the total loan can have a large impact on the borrower's total costs. This is especially true for short-term loans, a typical characteristic of microcredit. As these fees represent an inherent cost of borrowing, they must also be added to the charge for interest in order to show the effective APR.

== Benefits of flat rate lending ==
Flat interest rates have the following advantages:

- They are easy to calculate and track: Flat interest rates require no calculations to blend principal and interest into a level payment and, as long as these are made on time, require no compounding calculations (see the example to the right). Flat rates keep loan commitments clear, transparent and easily tracked by both parties. Many microfinance institutions do not have computers, so the complexity of true, declining balance calculations may confuse their borrowers and even their staff. Semi-formal institutions like self-help groups, village banks and ASCAs also usually prefer the flat rate method.
- They meet vital cash flow needs of farmers: Many borrowers in developing countries are farmers who demand loans with balloon payments, repayable after they harvest their crops. When the borrower has use of the full amount of principal throughout the entire loan term, flat rate calculations equate to true rate. For farmers accustomed to these types of transactions, flat rate cash loans are familiar and easy to understand.
- They support 'in-kind' loan transactions: As mentioned above, flat rate loans originated before currency was invented, and are commonly used to repay loans in regular instalments of chickens, eggs, kilos of rice, and so on.

== Problems with flat rate lending ==
Flat interest rates have the following disadvantages:

- They are complicated by early or late payments: If a loan calls for repayment at regular intervals but these are not made when due, the total cost of credit and those repayments are inapplicable; interest must be recalculated based on (a) the amount outstanding from time to time and (b) the true rate. If the loan is repaid ahead of time, refusing to allow an interest discount would be unfair to borrowers and remove the incentive to honour their legal obligations early. Conversely, if the loan is repaid late, failing to apply additional interest would be unfair to lenders and encourage borrowers to dishonor their legal obligations. In either case, it is a mistake to claim that that "flat" means "fixed" in the sense of the original total cost of credit. Writing of the practices of microfinance institutions in Bangladesh, S.M. Rahman points out that "[i]f one client takes a loan today and offers to repay the entire loan the next day, the client has to repay the total loan along with the whole year's interest, reckoned on a flat rate system."
- Their meaning is sometimes confused: The expression "flat rate" is sometimes mistaken for "fixed rate". As mentioned above, flat rate is a method of calculating the total cost of credit if all payments are made on time. Whether or not a rate is variable depends on the terms of the underlying agreement.
- They can make it difficult to compare rates: As with weights and measures, a common system is not the only but represents the simplest way of comparing offers. Loans quoted with flat interest rates generally prevail where declining balance calculations are not understandable to most borrowers, which - as mentioned above - is the case almost everywhere. "Not only the clients but even educated people sometimes have trouble understanding this system. The problem is that the flat rate gives an impression of a lower rate than it actually is." Where loans quoted with declining balance rates are not required by law, flat interest rates are also often used. The latter will be selected by borrowers if they mistakenly believe all rates are comparable without adjustment. Chuck Waterfield, designer of Microfin, a widely used financial modeling tool for MFIs, asks "Why did such a system appear in microfinance lending? The answer is obvious and cannot be debated: it allows the institution to charge nearly twice as much interest for the quoted interest rate as with the declining balance method."
- They may result in undervaluation of a loan portfolio: In addition, flat rate calculations may slightly understate the size of an outstanding loan portfolio which could result in the appearance of a lower average loan size and of a higher yield. Both of these characteristics appeal to donors and external financiers.

== Towards consumer protection in borrowing ==
The less developed an economy, the less capacity the government may have to regulate informal lenders. As a result, Brigit Helms argues for an evolutionary approach to interest rates, in which they can be expected to gradually drop as competition increases and the government gains greater capacity to effectively enforce comparable interest rate disclosures on financial sector actors.

F.W. Raiffeisen as early as 1889, writing to the credit unions then emerging in Germany, campaigned against maintaining the total charge for credit unchanged, even when a loan is repaid early. “It is immoral to charge interest in advance, and also objectionable as a business method. Every member shall have the right at any time to pay back his loan. If interest has been charged for a full year in advance, the members who have made repayments ahead of time, pay too much interest, unless the Credit Union makes a refund.”

Separately, interest rate ceilings and popular conflation of flat with true rates, has led some institutions to replace or complement interest with transaction fees and other charges, sometimes circumventing disclosure norms consistent with APR. For these reasons, interest is no longer quoted by reference to the flat rate in certain developed countries (for example, in the US, see the Truth in Lending Act), whilst many insist that loans always quote the APR.

Nevertheless, loans originally quoted and engaged with a flat rate remain contractually valid and still feature widely in both developed and developing countries.

== See also ==
- Annual percentage rate
- Flat rate
- Interest
- Microfinance
- Truth in Lending Act
