= Solidarity lending =

Lending practice

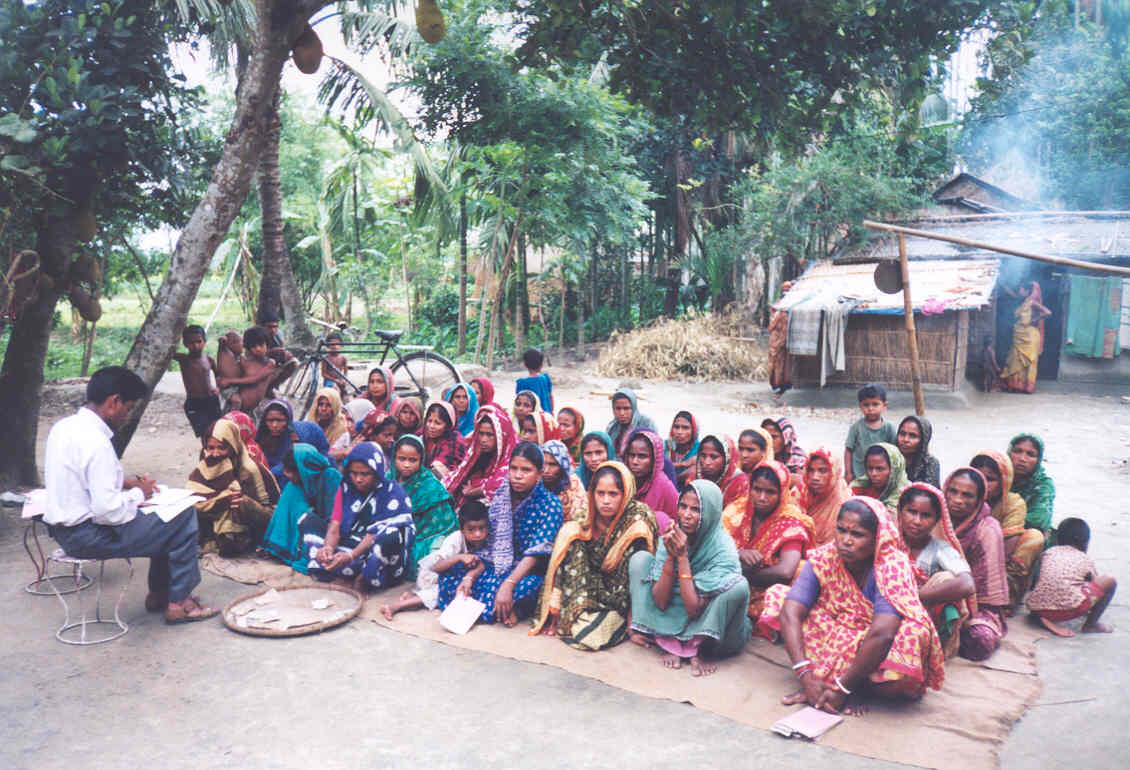
Solidarity lending involves collateral-free loans through solidarity groups and village organizations like this one in Bangladesh.

Solidarity lending is a lending practice where small groups borrow collectively and group members encourage one another to repay. It is an important building block of microfinance.

== Operations ==
Solidarity lending takes place through 'solidarity groups'. These groups are a distinctive banking distribution channel used primarily to deliver microcredit to poor people. Solidarity lending lowers the costs to a financial institution related to assessing, managing and collecting loans, and can eliminate the need for collateral. Since there is a fixed cost associated with each loan delivered, a bank that bundles individual loans together and permits a group to manage individual relationships can realize substantial savings in administrative and management costs.

In many developing countries the legal system offers little, if any support for the property rights of poor people. Laws related to secured transactions – a cornerstone of Western banking – may also be absent or unenforced. Instead, solidarity lending levers various types of social capital like peer pressure, mutual support and a healthy culture of repayment. These characteristics make solidarity lending more useful in rural villages than in urban centres where mobility is greater and social capital is weaker.

Efforts to replicate solidarity lending in developed countries have generally not succeeded. For example, the Calmeadow Foundation tested an analogous 'peer lending' model in three locations in Canada: rural Nova Scotia and urban Toronto and Vancouver during the 1990s. It concluded that a variety of factors – including difficulties in reaching the target market, the high risk profile of clients, their general distaste for the joint liability requirement, and high overhead costs – made solidarity lending unviable without subsidies. However, debates have continued about whether the required subsidies may be justified as an alternative to other subsidies targeted to the entrepreneurial poor, and VanCity Credit Union, which took over Calmeadow's Vancouver operations, continues to use peer lending.

== Distinctiveness ==
Tapping social capital to lend money is not new to microfinance. Earlier precedents include the informal practices of ROSCAs and the bonds of association used in credit unions. In India, the practice of self-help group banking is inspired by similar principles.

However, solidarity groups are distinctly different from earlier approaches in several important ways.

First, solidarity groups are very small, typically involving 5 individuals who are allowed to choose one another but cannot be related. Five is often cited as an ideal size because it is:

- small enough to ensure a maximum level of joint responsibility and discourage free riders, and
- large enough to prevent the misfortune or incompetence of one person from causing the group to collapse.

Much evidence has also shown that social pressure is more effective among women than among men. The vast majority of loans using this methodology are delivered to women.

Learning from the failure of the Comilla Model of cooperative credit piloted by Akhtar Hameed Khan in the 1950s and '60s, Grameen Bank and many other microcredit institutions have also taken an assertive approach to targeting poor women and excluding non-poor individuals entirely.

A major reason for the prior failure of credit cooperatives in Bangladesh was that the groups were too big and consisted of people with varied economic backgrounds. These large groups did not work because the more affluent members captured the organizations.

== Grameen Bank ==
An early pioneer of solidarity lending, Dr. Muhammad Yunus of Grameen Bank in Bangladesh describes the dynamics of lending through solidarity groups this way:

... Group membership not only creates support and protection but also smooths out the erratic behavior patterns of individual members, making each borrower more reliable in the process. Subtle and at times not-so-subtle peer pressure keeps each group member in line with the broader objectives of the credit program. … Because the group approves the loan request of each member, the group assumes moral responsibility for the loan. If any member of the group gets into trouble, the group usually comes forward to help.

The Grameen approach uses solidarity groups as its primary building block. However, responsibility for delinquent loans is handled by the elected leaders of a larger, village-level group called a 'centre' composed of eight solidarity groups. Because all the members are from the same village and loan payments take place during the centre meeting, the principle of using social capital for leverage is not compromised; the only difference is that all the members of the centre are collectively responsible for unpaid loans.

Many microcredit institutions use solidarity groups essentially as a form of joint liability. That is, they will take any action practical to collect a seriously delinquent loan not just from the individual member, but from any member of the solidarity group with the capability to repay it. But Yunus has always rejected this concept, arguing that whatever moral responsibility may pertain among group members, there is no formal or legal "... form of joint liability, i.e. group members are not responsible to pay on behalf of a defaulting member."

== Application ==
Solidarity lending is widespread in microfinance today, particularly in Asia. In addition to Grameen Bank, major practitioners include SEWA, Bank Rakyat Indonesia, Accion International, FINCA, BRAC and SANASA. The Calmeadow Foundation was another important pioneer.

The Microbanking Bulletin tracks solidarity lending as a separate microfinance methodology. Of 446 microfinance institutions worldwide that it was tracking at the end of 2005, 39 lent only through this method, while another 205 used a mix of solidarity and individual lending. The average loan balance outstanding at solidarity lenders was $109 (19% of local gross national income), compared to $1,024 (61% of local gross national income) among individual lenders. This shows not only that solidarity lenders are meeting the needs of a significantly poorer market segment, but also that they are doing it in significantly poorer countries.

In Costa Rica, many companies enable their employees to organize Asociaciones Solidaristas (Solidarism Associations), which enables them to create saving funds, loans, and financial activities (for example managing the company's coffee shop) with financial support from the company.

== Criticisms ==
Solidarity lending has clearly had a positive impact on many borrowers. Without it, many would not have borrowed at all, or would have been forced to rely on loan sharks. However, it has been the subject of much criticism. A recent survey of the empirical research concludes that the search for alternative approaches must continue, and highlights problems such as "borrowers growing frustrated at the cost of attending regular meetings, loan officers refusing to sanction good borrowers who happen to be in 'bad' groups, and constraints imposed by the diverging ambitions of group members."

Efforts to ensure that all members of solidarity groups are equally poor may not always improve group performance. Greater socio-economic diversity "means that group members' incomes are less likely to vary together, and thus group members' ability to insure each other increases". The solidarity lending approach, which excludes less-poor borrowers, was adopted in large part because of a view that the more inclusive cooperative 'bond of association' had failed in Bangladesh (see the Comilla Model). But the founder of Bangladesh's credit cooperatives, Akhter Hameed Khan documented that the Model's practices contravened two fundamental credit union operating principles: independence from government intervention, and local financial self-reliance. The case that the 'inclusive' approach to organizational development used by the Comilla Model accounts for its failure has not been made.

While poverty-targeting has had many successes, social solidarity is not solely a tool for the lending institution – it can also be used by borrowers. A loan 'strike', if it gains the sympathy of a large number of borrowers, can lead to a rapid and highly unstabilizing escalation in delinquencies. It was this type of circumstance that led in 1998, to the rapid escalation of delinquency at Grameen Bank that resulted in the redesign dubbed 'Grameen II'.

The photo above – of a group of women seated in rows on the ground before a male NGO-officer who sits in a chair processing their payments – encapsulates another common critique. Solidarity groups may be composed entirely of women, but the staff who decide when and if they receive financial services are often dominated by males.

== See also ==
- Bond of association
- Comilla Model
- Village banking
