= Microcredit for water supply and sanitation =

Microcredit for water supply and sanitation is the application of microcredit to provide loans to small enterprises and households in order to increase access to an improved water source and sanitation in developing countries.

For background, most investments in water supply and sanitation infrastructure are financed by the public sector, but investment levels have been insufficient to achieve universal access. Commercial credit to public utilities was limited by low tariffs and insufficient cost-recovery. Microcredits are a complementary or alternative approach to allow the poor to gain access to water supply and sanitation in the aforementioned regions.

Funding is allocated either to small-scale independent water-providers who generate an income stream from selling water, or to households in order to finance house connections, plumbing installations, or on-site sanitation such as latrines. Many microfinance institutions have only limited experience with financing investments in water supply and sanitation. While there have been many pilot projects in both urban and rural areas, only a small number of these have been expanded. A water connection can significantly lower a family's water expenditures, if it previously had to rely on water vendors, allowing cost-savings to repay the credit. The time previously required to physically fetch water can be put to income-generating purposes, and investments in sanitation provide health benefits that can also translate into increased income.

== Types ==
There are three broad types of microcredit products in the water sector:

- Microcredits aiming to improve access to water supply and sanitation at the household level.
- Credits for small and medium enterprises for small water-supply investments.
- Credits to upgrade urban services and shared facilities in low-income areas.

== Household credits ==
Microcredits can be targeted specifically at water and sanitation, or general-purpose microcredits may be used for this purpose. Such use is typically to finance household water and sewerage connections, bathrooms, toilets, pit latrines, rainwater harvesting tanks or water purifiers. The loans are generally US$30–250 with a tenure of less than three years.

Microfinance institutions, such as Grameen Bank, the Vietnam Bank for Social Policies, and numerous microfinance institutions in India and Kenya, offer credits to individuals for water and sanitation facilities. Non-government organisations (NGOs) that are not microfinance institutions, such as Dustha Shasthya Kendra (DSK) in Bangladesh or Community Integrated Development Initiatives in Uganda, also provide credits for water supply and sanitation. The potential market size is considered huge in both rural and urban areas and some of these water and sanitation schemes have achieved a significant scale. Nevertheless, compared to the microfinance institution's overall size, they still play a minor role.

In 1999, all microfinance institutions in Bangladesh and more recently in Vietnam had reached only about 9 percent and 2.4 percent of rural households respectively. In either country, water and sanitation amounts to less than two percent of the microfinance institution's total portfolio. However, borrowers for water supply and sanitation comprised 30 percent of total borrowers for Grameen Bank and 10 percent of total borrowers from Vietnam Bank for Social Policies. For instance, the water and sanitation portfolio of the Indian microfinance institution SEWA Bank comprised 15 percent of all loans provided in the city of Admedabad over a period of five years.

=== Examples ===
==== WaterCredit ====
The US-based NGO Water.org, through its WaterCredit initiative, had since 2003 supported microfinance institutions and NGOs in India, Bangladesh, Kenya and Uganda in providing microcredit for water supply and sanitation. As of 2011, it had helped its 13 partner organisations to make 51,000 credits. The organisation claimed a 97% repayment rate and stated that 90% of its borrowers were women. WaterCredit did not subsidise interest rates and typically did not make microcredits directly. Instead, it connected microfinance institutions with water and sanitation NGOs to develop water and sanitation microcredits, including through market assessments and capacity-building. Only in exceptional cases did it provide guarantees, standing letters of credit or the initial capital to establish a revolving fund managed by an NGO that was not previously engaged in microcredit.

==== Indonesia ====
Since 2003 Bank Rakyat Indonesia financed water connections with the water utility PDAM through microcredits with support from the USAID Environmental Services Program. According to an impact assessment conducted in 2005, the program helped the utility to increase its customer base by 40% which reduced its costs per cubic meter of water sold by 42% and reduced its non-revenue water from 56.5% in 2002 to 36% percent at the end of 2004.

==== Vietnam ====
In 1999, the World Bank in cooperation with the governments of Australia, Finland and Denmark supported the creation of a Sanitation Revolving Fund with an initial working capital of US$3 million. The project was carried out in the cities of Danang, Haiphong, and Quang Ninh. The aim was to provide small loans (US$145) to low-income households for targeted sanitation investments such as septic tanks, urine diverting/composting latrines or sewer connections. Participating households had to join a savings and credit group of 12 to 20 people, who were required to live near each other to ensure community control. The loans had a catalyst effect for household investment. With loans covering approximately two-thirds of investment costs, households had to find complementary sources of finance (from family and friends).

In contrast to a centralised, supply-driven approach, where government institutions design a project with little community consultation and no capacity-building for the community, this approach was strictly demand-driven and thus required the Sanitation Revolving Fund to develop awareness-raising campaigns for sanitation. Managed by the microfinance-experienced Women's Union of Vietnam, the Sanitation Revolving Fund gave 200,000 households the opportunity to finance and build sanitation facilities over a period of seven years. With a leverage effect of up to 25 times the amount of public spending on household investment and repayment rates of almost 100 percent, the fund is seen as a best practice example by its financiers. In 2009 it was considered to be scaled up with further support of the World Bank and the Vietnam Bank for Social Policies.

== Small and medium enterprise loans ==
Small and medium enterprise (SME) loans are used for investments by community groups, for private providers in greenfield contexts, or for rehabilitation measures of water supply and sanitation. Supplied by mature microfinance institutions, these loans are seen as suitable for other suppliers in the value chain such as pit latrine emptiers and tanker suppliers. With the right conditions such as a solid policy environment and clear institutional relationships, there is a market potential for small-scale water supply projects.

In comparison to retail loans on the household level, the experience with loan products for SME is fairly limited. These loan programs remain mostly at the pilot level. However, the design of some recent projects using microcredits for community-based service providers in some African countries (such as those of the K-Rep Bank in Kenya and Togo) shows a sustainable expansion potential. In the case of Kenya's K-Rep Bank, the Water and Sanitation Program, which facilitated the project, is already exploring a country-wide scaling up.

=== Examples ===
==== Kenya ====
Kenya has numerous community-managed small-water enterprises. The Water and Sanitation Program (WSP) has launched an initiative to use microcredits to promote these enterprises. As part of this initiative, the commercial microfinance bank K-Rep Bank provided loans to 21 community-managed water projects. The Global Partnership on Output-based Aid (GPOBA) supported the programme by providing partial subsidies. Every project is pre-financed with a credit of up to 80 percent of the project costs (averaging US$80,000). After an independent verification process, certifying a successful completion, a part of the loan is refinanced by a 40 percent output-based aid subsidy. The remaining loan repayments have to be generated from water revenues. In addition, technical-assistance grants are provided to assist with the project development.

==== Togo ====
In Togo, CREPA (Centre Regional pour l'Eau Potable et L'Assainissement à Faible Côut) had encouraged the liberalisation of water services in 2001. As a consequence, six domestic microfinance institutions were preparing microcredit scheme for a shallow borehole (US$3,000) or rainwater-harvesting tank (US$1,000). The loans were originally dedicated to households, which act as a small private provider, selling water in bulk or in buckets. However, the funds were disbursed directly to the private (drilling) companies. In the period from 2001 to 2006, roughly 1,200 water points were built and have been used for small-business activities by the households which participated in that programme.

== Urban services upgrading ==
Microcredit has been applied only to a limited extent in upgrading urban water supply and sanitation services, particularly in low-income areas where traditional financing and public investment fall short. In many urban settings, infrastructure development is typically financed by government programs, donor support, or large development loans rather than small loans to households or communities. Microfinance institutions have ventured into urban services upgrading in a handful of cases, offering loans to support community-level improvements and shared facilities such as communal water points, sanitation blocks, and piped networks. "Microcredit for Water Supply and Sanitation Solutions". CGAA.

However, evidence suggests that experience with microcredit in urban upgrading remains limited. A review of innovative financing mechanisms notes that, while some microfinance institutions in Latin America and South Asia have provided loan products to support community-level infrastructure upgrades, uptake has been constrained by the scale, long payback periods, and regulatory challenges associated with urban water and sanitation investments. "Innovative Financing Mechanisms for the Water Sector" (PDF). OECD.

In practice, microcredit products in the water supply and sanitation sector have been more commonly used for household-level improvements or small business water services, rather than for wide-scale urban infrastructure upgrades. Some programs combine microcredit with other financing mechanisms and partnerships among NGOs, financial institutions, and local authorities to facilitate improvements in low-income urban communities, but such schemes have not yet been deployed at scale in most cities. "Microcredit for Water Supply and Sanitation Solutions". CGAA.

== See also ==
- Water supply
- Sanitation
