= Self-help group (finance) =

Small financial intermediary structure

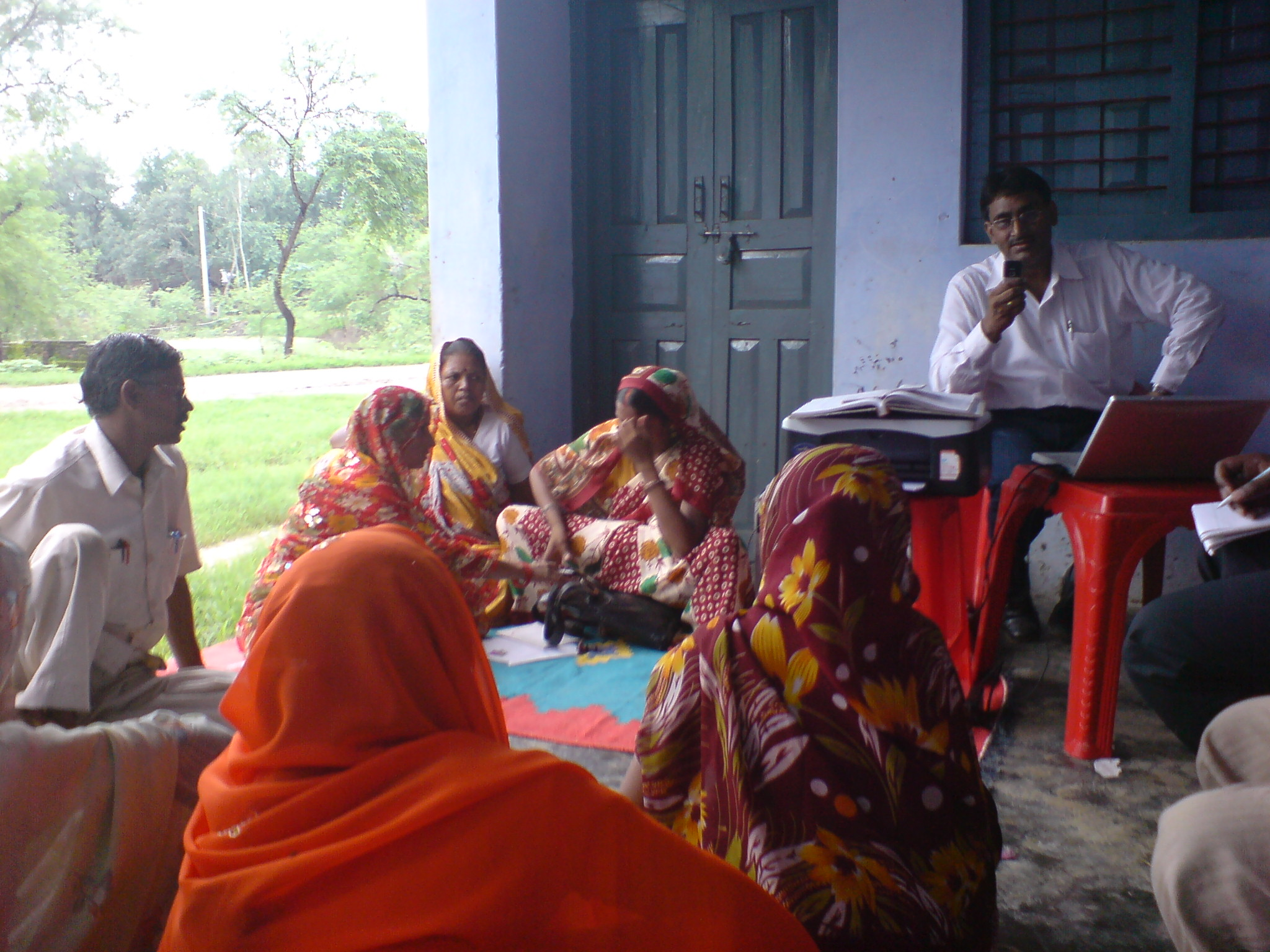
Mobile self-help group banking in Uttar Pradesh, India

A self-help group (commonly abbreviated SHG) is a financial intermediary committee usually composed of 12 to 25 local women between the ages of 18 and 50. Most self-help groups are in India, though they can be found in other countries, especially in South Asia and Southeast Asia. A SHG is generally a group of people who work on daily wages who form a loose grouping or union. Money is collected from those who are able to donate and given to members in need.

Members may also make small regular savings contributions over a few months until there is enough money in the group to begin lending. Funds may then be lent back to the members or to others in the village for any purpose. In India, many SHGs are linked with banks for the delivery of micro-credit.

== Structure ==
A SHG is a community-based group with 10-25 members. Members are usually women from similar social and economic backgrounds, all voluntarily coming together to save small sums of money, on a regular basis. They pool their resources to become financially stable, taking loans from their collective savings in times of emergency or financial scarcity, important life events or to purchase assets. The group members use collective wisdom and peer pressure to ensure proper end-use of credit and timely repayment. In India, RBI regulations mandate that banks offer financial services, including collateral free loans to these groups, on very low interest rates. This allows poor women to circumvent the challenges of exclusion from institutional financial services. This system is closely related to that of solidarity lending, widely used by microfinance institutions.

Beyond their function as savings and credit groups, SHGs offer poor women a platform for building solidarity. They allow women to come together and act on issues related to their own lives including health, nutrition, governance and gender justice.

== Goals ==
Self-help groups are started by non-governmental organizations (NGOs) that generally have broad anti-poverty agendas. Self-help groups are seen as instruments for goals including empowering women, developing leadership abilities among the poor and the needy, increasing school enrolment and improving nutrition and the use of birth control. Financial intermediation is generally seen more as an entry point to these other goals, rather than as a primary objective. This can hinder their development as sources of village capital, as well as their efforts to aggregate locally controlled pools of capital through federation, as was historically accomplished by credit unions.

== NABARD's 'SHG Bank Linkage' program ==
Many self-help groups, especially in India, under NABARD's 'SHG Bank Linkage' program, borrow from banks once they have accumulated a base of their own capital. This model has attracted attention as a possible way of delivering micro-finance services to poor populations that have been difficult to reach directly through banks or other institutions. "By aggregating their individual savings into a single deposit, self-help groups minimize the bank's transaction costs and generate an attractive volume of deposits. Through self-help groups, the bank can serve small rural depositors while paying them a market rate of interest."

According to a report from 2006, NABARD estimates that there are 2.2 million SHGs in India, representing 33 million members, that have taken loans from banks under its linkage program to date. This does not include SHGs that have not borrowed. A study conducted by S Chakrabarti in 2004 said that organization like SHG can be an effective tool for "allevating poverty"."The SHG Banking Linkage Programme since its beginning has been predominant in certain states, showing spatial preferences especially for the southern region – Andhra-Pradesh, Tamil Nadu, Kerala, and Karnataka. These states accounted for 57% of the SHG credits linked during the financial year 2005–2006."
