= Grameen America =

Non-profit loan provider in New York

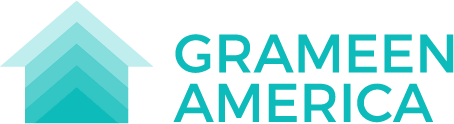
- Founded: January 2008
- Founder: Muhammad Yunus
- Type: Nonprofit organization
- Purpose: Economic development
- Headquarters: Jackson Heights, NY
- Location: New York, New York, United States
- Region served: United States
- Method: Microcredit
- Key people: Muhammad Yunus (Chairman Board of Directors); Andrea Jung (President and Chief Executive Officer)
- Website: grameenamerica.org

Grameen America is a 501(c)(3) nonprofit microfinance organization based in New York City. It was founded by Nobel Peace Prize recipient Muhammad Yunus in 2008. Grameen America is run by former Avon Chairman and CEO Andrea Jung. The organization provides loans, savings programs, financial education, and credit establishment to women who live in poverty in the United States. All loans must be used to build small businesses.

== Services ==
Grameen America offers four key products.

1. Microloans. The maximum first-time loan is $2,500, though borrowers can return for larger loans once they have repaid their initial loan.
2. Savings program. Grameen America provides no-fee, no minimum balance savings accounts through commercial partner banks.
3. Credit Establishment. Grameen America helps members build credit by reporting loan repayments directly to Experian and Equifax.
4. Financial Education. Grameen encourages group mentoring during a five-day initial training and weekly meetings with members.

== Lending process ==
The requirements to receive a loan: The individual must be living below the poverty line, located in a community with a Grameen America branch and willing to create or join a five-member group of like-minded individuals who want to start or expand their own businesses. No credit score, collateral, guarantors, or bank account is required.

Grameen America uses a peer-group lending model pioneered by Professor Yunus and the Grameen Bank in Bangladesh. Once a peer group of five borrowers is formed, they go through a financial training program. Upon completion of the training program, each member receives their loan. Grameen America staff holds mandatory weekly group meetings during which members repay loans and receive peer support and mentoring. Upon successful repayment, members may apply for another loan. The success of the Grameen Bank microfinance model in Bangladesh demonstrates that a high-touch model based on small weekly payments can yield exceptional repayment rates.

== Purpose of loans ==
Grameen America requires all loans to be used to start or expand income-generating businesses. Common businesses include food carts, flower stands, tailoring, jewelry and crafts and salon services.

== Locations ==
Grameen America's first branch, located in Jackson Heights, Queens, opened in January 2008. As of 2023, Grameen America operates in Queens, Brooklyn, Bronx and Manhattan, New York, as well as in Omaha, Nebraska, Indianapolis, Indiana, Charlotte, North Carolina, San Francisco Bay Area, Los Angeles, and San Jose, California, Austin, Texas, Union City, New Jersey, Boston, Massachusetts, and Miami, Florida, Houston, Texas, San Antonio, Texas, Dallas, Texas, Atlanta, Georgia, Memphis, Tennessee, Trenton, New Jersey, and Connecticut.

Previously concentrated almost entirely around New York, Grameen America now has 32 branches in 24 cities. It plans to expand to Phoenix in late 2023.

== History ==
Grameen America presentation

Grameen America was founded upon the belief that Grameen Bank's microfinance lending system could succeed in urban America as it had in Bangladesh. Professor Yunus believed that microfinance should be put to work in the capital of international finance, New York City, in which a segment of the population do not have access to banks and mainstream financial institutions. Grameen America opened its doors in January 2008. In September 2018, Grameen America reached a milestone of $1 billion dispersed in microloans to over 100,000 of its members in the ten years since its founding. As of 2023, Grameen America has disbursed more than $3 billion in affordable capital.

New York City is the world capital of banking. In these skyscrapers that New York built, they control world finance. What I pointed out is that they do the banking with the world but they don't do the banking with their neighbors. We are here to show that there is nothing wrong with doing banking with neighbors. So we hope we will create some confidence in them. If we change the banks' mind, the whole world will change.

— Muhammad Yunus, May 17, 2010, Grand Opening of Grameen America's Manhattan branch

== Statistics ==
As of the end of 2017, Grameen America had disbursed over $760 million in micro-loans to more than 95,000 low-income women in the United States.

== Management ==
Board of Directors:

- Muhammad Yunus - Chairman of the Board of Directors
- Michael D. Granoff
- Vidar Jorgensen
- Andrea Jung
- Mahmoud Mamdani
- John Megrue
- Karen Pritzker

Directors Emeritus:

- Ray Dalio

== Affiliation ==
Grameen America is a Grameen replication project.
