= Project Enterprise =

Project Enterprise (PE)
- Company type: nonprofit organization
- Industry: Financial services
- Founded: 1997
- Defunct: 2017
- Fate: Unknown
- Headquarters: New York City
- Area served: Upper Manhattan, Brooklyn, Queens and the Bronx.
- Key people: Mel Washington, Executive Director
- Products: Loans, microfinance, and business training
- Revenue: $1,011,518 (2007)
- Total assets: $318,728 (2007)
- Website: www.projectenterprise.org

Project Enterprise was an American microfinance nonprofit organization in New York City providing entrepreneurs from underserved areas with loans, business training and networking opportunities. Operating on the Grameen Bank model of microlending, as of 2008, Project Enterprise (PE) had served more than 2,500 entrepreneurs in New York City, and provides microloans from $1,500 to $12,000. The organizations web site was closed in 2017.

== History ==
Project Enterprise was started in 1997 as the only provider of business microloans in New York City that does not require prior business experience, credit history or collateral to provide market-rate financing for small businesses. PE has been a certified Community development financial institution since 1998. Founding Executive Director Vanessa Rudin was replaced by Arva Rice in November 2003.

From 2004-2006 PE saw substantial growth with increasing numbers of loans and total amounts lent. After conducting focus groups new loan products, events and resources for entrepreneurs were developed. PE launched a networking event programme, Big Connections, and an Access to Markets program addressing bringing products and services to the marketplace.

During the economic downturn, Project Enterprise saw an increase in demand and in 2008 had its best year since inception. Mel Washington became the Executive Director on 1 September 2009.

=== Awards ===
In 2006, PE won the Association of Enterprise Opportunity's Innovation in Program Design Award for the Access to Markets Initiative. In 2007, PE staff member Althea Burton was made the New York Small Business Administration Home-Based Business Champion of the Year.

The organizations web site was closed and appeared to stop operating in 2017.
