= Schlein =

Schlein is a German- and Yiddish-language surname. Notable people with the surname include:

- Benjamin Schlein (born 1975), Italian mathematician;
- Elly Schlein (born 1985), Italian politician;
- Michael Schlein (born 1961), American entrepreneur, president and CEO of Accion;
- Miriam Schlein (1926–2004), American author;
- Rory Schlein (born 1984), Australian international speedway rider;
- Ted Schlein, general partner of Kleiner Perkins Caufield & Byers.
