= Accion International =

International nonprofit organization

Accion
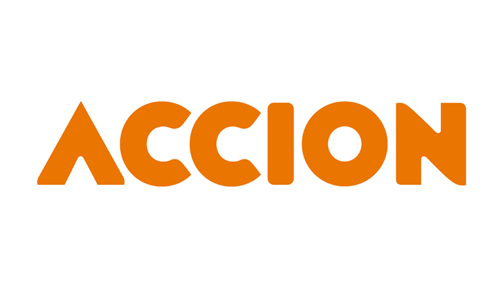
- Type: Nonprofit Organization
- Founded: 1961
- Headquarters: Cambridge, Massachusetts
- Key people: Diana Taylor, Chair, Board of Directors; Michael Schlein, President and CEO; Michael Chu, President Emeritus
- Revenue: 40,829,047 United States dollar (2016)
- Total assets: 427,090,566 United States dollar (2022)
- Number of employees: 150-200 (November 2017)
- Website: http://www.accion.org/

Accion is an international nonprofit. Founded as a community development initiative serving the poor in Venezuela, it works with local partners in different countries to develop and scale digital financial solutions for underserved people globally.

To date, it has more than 235 financial service providers operating across 75 countries.

Accion is headquartered in Cambridge, Massachusetts, and also has offices in Washington, D.C.; Bogotá, Colombia; Mumbai, India; and Beijing, China. Accion works across Latin America and the Caribbean, Africa, the Middle East and Asia. In the U.S., Accion operates a nationwide nonprofit lending network.

== Background and history ==
=== 1960s ===
Accion was founded in 1961 by a UC Berkeley law student named Joseph Blatchford.

Blatchford's founding of Accion was heavily influenced by the philosophical works of Alexis de Tocqueville, Aldous Huxley and Mohandas Gandhi as well as The Ugly American by UC Berkeley professor Eugene Burdick and the classic essay “The Moral Equivalent of War” by William James. Working from James’ main thesis, Blatchford believed that Americans needed to find new, non-militaristic ways to focus their involvement abroad while promoting self-determination and democracy. A volunteer corps dedicated to international cooperation and grassroots development was one such path.

Blatchford recruited two other standout UC Berkeley law students, Jerry Brady and Gary Glenn, to manage volunteer recruitment, publicity, and the stateside orientation of volunteers while he continued to cultivate contacts in Latin America.

In the summer of 1961, the first group of 30 Americans was ready to deploy to poor barrios in urban centers around Venezuela.

The nature of Accion's first projects reflected needs that the communities themselves identified as priorities. The Accion workers did everything from digging ditches to building schools to fundraising to managing sensitive negotiations between opposing community leaders. About the range of these early projects, Blatchford reflected, “The project depended on what the community was concerned about. Then the community did it; they created committees and were in charge of the project. They realized they could do it and it changed their lives.”

By the mid-1960s, Accion was engaging fewer and fewer North Americans and Europeans and instead was hiring college-educated Venezuelans as organizers—a group called “Community Action Organizers.”

Throughout the 1960s, Blatchford and other Accionistas worked with local business leaders in Argentina, Brazil (Rio, São Paulo, and Recife) and Peru to set up community development organizations that followed the same philosophy as the original Accion in Venezuela: “not to give people alms but to give them confidence in their own ability.” Many of these organizations, including Ação Comunitária do Brasil Rio de Janeiro, Ação Comunitária do Brasil São Paulo and Accion Comunitaria de Peru, which today is Mibanco. – were still in existence as of 2015.

A few years after launching in Venezuela, Accion established itself in New York to provide technical support to funders and business leaders in Latin American countries who wanted to start community action programs like Accion did in Venezuela.

=== 1970s ===
By the early 1970s, Accion began to focus on addressing a major cause of poverty in Latin American cities: lack of economic opportunity.

In 1973, Accion staff in Recife, Brazil, began to focus their efforts on helping informal businesses. An Accion organization in Recife called UNO coined the term "microenterprise" and began issuing small loans, pioneering the field of microcredit.

=== 1980s ===
Over the next decade, Accion helped start microfinance programs in 14 countries in Latin America. Accion and its partners developed a lending method that met the needs of microenterprises.

The ability to cover costs, augmented by Accion's new loan guarantee fund, the Bridge Fund, enabled Accion's partners to connect with the local banking sector and dramatically increase the number of microentrepreneurs they reached. Between 1989 and 1995, Accion's Latin American networked loan disbursements multiplied more than 20 times.

Convinced that microfinance had the potential to transform the economic landscape of Latin America, Accion recognized that microfinance institutions (MFIs) would need access to a much larger pool of capital.

To help them achieve this, Accion helped create BancoSol, the first commercial bank in the world dedicated solely to microenterprise. Founded in Bolivia in 1992, its clients are typically market vendors, sandal makers, and seamstresses.

In 1994, Accion helped BancoSol sell certificates of deposit in the U.S. financial market.

=== 1990s ===
In 1991 Accion brought its microlending model to the United States by piloting a program in Brooklyn, New York. Accion aimed to help those who didn't meet requirements for traditional financing (such as bank loans) because their requested amount was too small or because they had limited or damaged credit.

Accion has since worked to further adapt its lending model to the social and economic needs of communities across the United States. Accion now serves small businesses nationwide through four independent community development financial institutions (CDFIs) and a national office that invests in shared knowledge, innovation, and impact to benefit the entire network.

Since 1991, the members of Accion in the U.S. have provided more than 60,000 loans to small business owners and disbursed more than $500 million in capital. Additionally, Accion provides business advising and training services—both in person and through online educational resources—to tens of thousands of entrepreneurs each year.

In 1995, Accion created an equity investment vehicle for microfinance, the Accion Gateway Fund, to provide new microfinance institutions with the resources they needed to expand.

=== 2000s ===
In October 2000, Accion began working in partnership with microlending organizations in sub-Saharan Africa, marking its first initiative outside the Americas. Recognizing the need for microcredit throughout Africa, Accion worked to increase financial inclusion for poor, self-employed Africans throughout the continent. In 2006, Accion launched a partnership with Ecobank, the leading regional bank in West Africa. Pan-African Savings and Loans (then called EB-Accion Savings and Loans) launched operations in Ghana in 2007 and is expanding to neighboring countries.

In 2005, Accion started a new venture to reach another underserved group: urban small business owners in India. Since establishing an office in the country, Accion has partnered with local financial institutions in Patna and Mumbai, assisting them in applying individual and group lending and tailored credit scoring, among other microfinance methodologies.

In 2007, Compartamos Banco, a Mexican microfinance institution and Accion investee, became the first Latin American MFI to offer equity through an initial public offering (IPO). The IPO sparked an industry-wide debate, with some "questioning the ethics of profit[ing] from the poor" and others arguing that "the profit motive can help lift many more people out of poverty than charity alone could ever do." Álvaro Rodríguez Arregui, chairman of Accion at the time, was among the latter and argued that the IPO was needed to attract much more capital to the microfinance industry, and Accion used the funds to advance its mission. Today, Compartamos stands out as one of the largest MFIs, in terms of the number of clients, in Latin America.

The proceeds from the IPO allowed Accion to create new MFIs in Brazil, Cameroon, China, Ghana, and India and strengthen, through investment or reinvestment, other partners in India, Africa, and Latin America. Accion also used the proceeds to establish and fund its Washington, D.C.–based think tank, the Center for Financial Inclusion (CFI) at Accion.

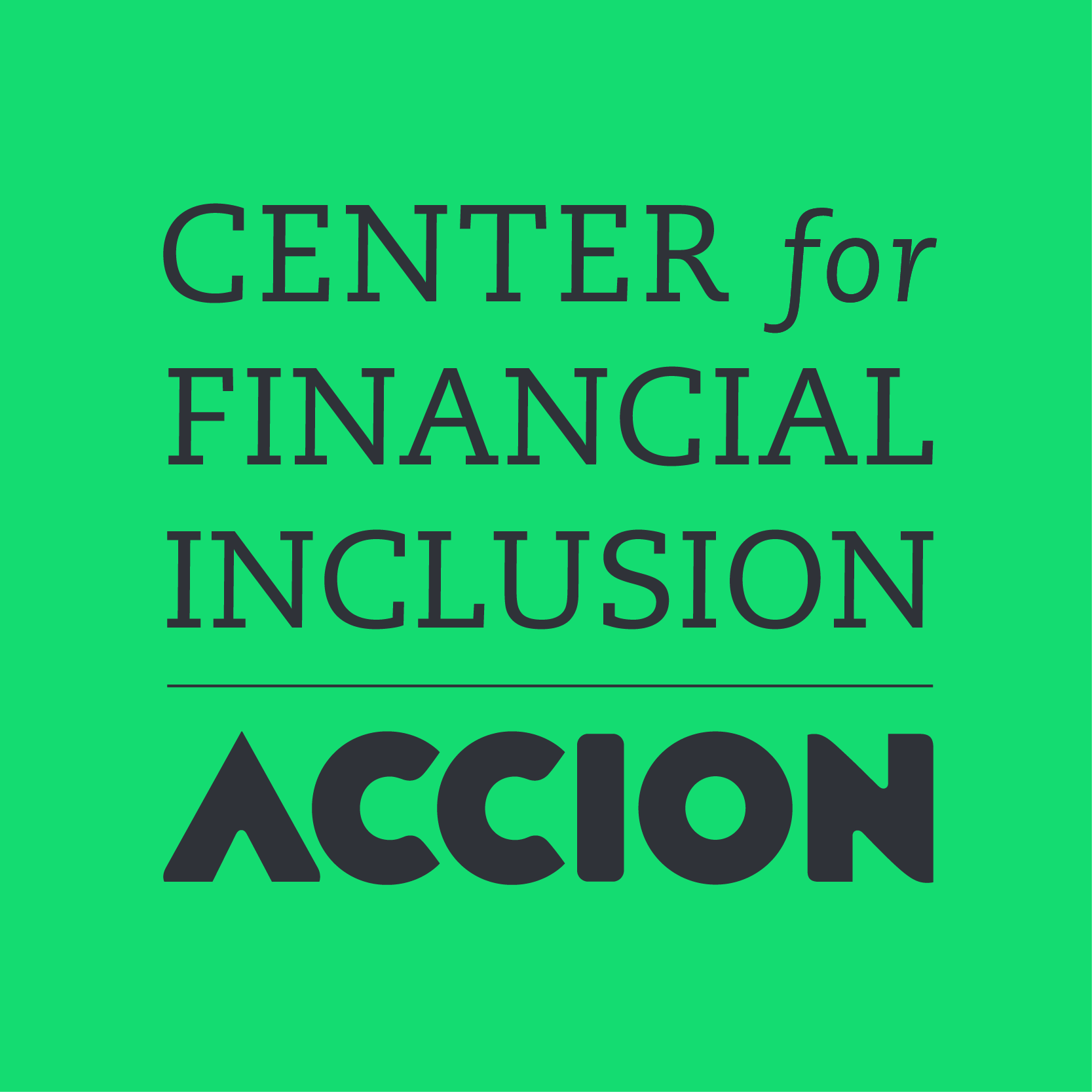
Center for Financial Inclusion at Accion

CFI's work is grouped into three broad categories:

Client Advocacy

Examples of CFI's industry-wide initiatives include the Smart Campaign, the world's first global consumer protection campaign, and Financial Inclusion 2020, a movement that mobilized stakeholders around the globe to achieve full financial inclusion, using the year 2020 as a focal point for action.

=== 2009–present ===
In 2009 and 2010, Accion helped to start microfinance institutions in underserved areas of Inner Mongolia, Cameroon, and Brazil.

In December 2009, Accion inaugurated Accion Microfinance China (AMC) in Chifeng Prefecture, Inner Mongolia; this microfinance institution represented the first wholly owned foreign microcredit company (MCC) and only the second wholly foreign-owned MCC in the country. Since then, Accion has transitioned ownership of AMC to Grassland Finance Ltd., a Hong Kong holding company incorporated in 2011 with a focus on founding or investing in financial services institutions in China that provide loans and other financial services to China's vast number of medium, small, and micro enterprises (MSMEs). Today, grassland has grown to more than 15 branches across six provinces.

In April 2012, Accion launched its seed-stage investment initiative, Accion Venture Lab. Venture Lab invests capital in, and provides support to innovative fintech start-ups that increase access to, improve the quality of, or reduce the cost of financial services for the underserved at scale. Since launching, Accion Venture Lab has deployed over $12 million across more than 30 start-ups that work in over 20 countries worldwide.

Accion expanded its work to yet another country in April 2015 when it partnered with Myanmar's DAWN, a microfinance institution originally launched in 2002 as a program of Save the Children. After decades of isolation beginning in the 1960s, Myanmar rejoined the world economy with a need for affordable services. Accion has helped DAWN integrate new technologies, triple its loan portfolio, and expand to more branches.

In November 2016, Accion announced an updated organizational strategy reflecting Accion's increasing focus on the potential for financial technology, or "fintech," to reach the world's three billion financially underserved people. See details on Accion's strategy below.

In March 2017, Accion announced the launch of a global fintech fund for the underserved: the Accion Frontier Inclusion Fund, managed by Quona Capital. The fund aims to help the world's three billion financially underserved people by catalyzing fintech innovations that can radically improve the quality and availability of financial services for the underserved. At its launch, the fund represented over $141 million in commitments from an array of institutional investors. Accion is the fund's sponsor and anchor investor; the fund's manager, Quona Capital, is an early-growth-stage venture firm focused on financial technology for underserved consumers and businesses in emerging markets. Investments include NeoGrowth, Yoco, Konfio, and First Circle.

== Accion's awards and recognitions ==
Award/recognition	Description
Institutional Investor's "Fintech Finance 40"	Accion's work has been included in this list every year since 2014. The listing ranks financiers leading the fintech revolution.
ImpactAssets 50	Accion has been included ImpactAssets 50 (IA 50) for six consecutive years. IA 50 is the only free, public, searchable database of outstanding impact investing fund managers.

== See also ==
- Financial Technology (Fintech)
- Impact Investing
- Microcredit
- Financial Inclusion
