= Joseph Blatchford =

Director of the US Peace Corps (1934–2020)

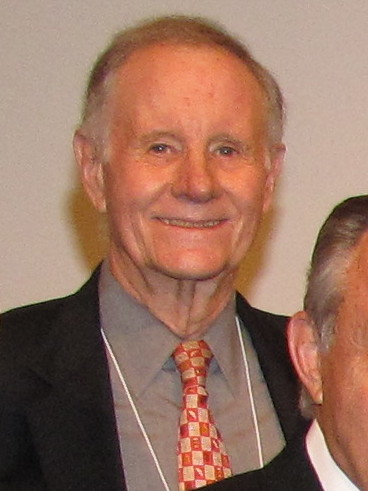
- Blatchford with other Peace Corps Directors in 2011

3rd Director of the United States Peace Corps
- In office May 1, 1969 – July 1, 1971
- Appointed by: Richard Nixon
- Preceded by: Jack Vaughn
- Succeeded by: Kevin O'Donnell

Personal details
- Born: June 7, 1934 Milwaukee, Wisconsin, U.S.
- Died: October 7, 2020 (aged 86) Washington, D.C., U.S.

Joseph Blatchford (June 7, 1934 – October 7, 2020) was the third Director of the United States Peace Corps succeeding Jack Vaughn. Blatchford was appointed Peace Corps Director in 1969 by President Richard Nixon.

== Early life and education ==
Blatchford was born in Milwaukee, Wisconsin on June 7, 1934. His family moved to California when Blatchford was ten years old and Blatchford grew up in Beverly Hills, California where his father dealt with motion picture finances. Blatchford attended Christian Science Sunday School growing up; however, in a profile published in the New York Times in 1970 he said that he is no longer a practicing Christian Scientist. Blatchford attended the University of California at Los Angeles where in 1956 during his senior year he was captain of the University of California's tennis team. Blatchford went on tennis tours of Europe and competed in the British tennis championships at Wimbledon in 1956. Blatchford was defeated by Neale Fraser of Australia in the second round 6–1, 6–1, 6–4. Blatchford then attended Berkeley Law and completed his JD.

== Founding of Accion ==
=== Good Will Tour ===
In 1958, vice-president Richard Nixon was charged by a mob in Venezuela. This started Blatchford, then a student at University of California, thinking about what could be done to restore the traditional friendship in the hemisphere. Blatchford's first venture in South America would be a good-will tour of the continent with four of his friends who were jazz musicians using tennis exhibitions and jam sessions as an entree into student communities. Blatchford organized the tour with Ronald K. Dunton, a trombone player, who had organized jazz groups that toured Europe and Mexico while an undergraduate at Dartmouth. Blatchford and Dunton decided to take a year off from school to organize the Latin American tour. The plan was to give afternoon tennis exhibitions and jazz concerts in the evening without admission charges that would be followed by discussions with young people. Blatchford and Dunton did not want any assistance from the government so they canvassed private companies, foundations, and individuals to raise $13,000 of the $15,000 they need for the tour.

On March 19, 1959, Blatchford left on a 120-day goodwill tour covering thirteen countries with their first stop in the Dominican Republic. The other members of their tour were Michael Payson, Toshio Nagatani, Donn Dhickering, Robert Shechteman, and Juan Elac. "Playing tennis exhibitions, trying to use sports and music as a door opener, handles as they say, to get to know students, politicians, labor leaders. We came back rather critical of American foreign policy and American ways of doing things in these countries," said Blatchford. "I saw the conditions and I saw the feeling of frustration that young people in Latin America had about not being able to forge their own futures."

Returning from the goodwill tour, Blatchford made the acquaintance of Eugene Burdick, author of the best seller The Ugly American (1958) that stressed the need for "personal" aid overseas. Burdick became an advisor to Accion. Burdick suggested that Blatchford obtain financial assistance from private enterprise to make a survey of the needs of various countries in Latin America. Arthur K. Watson, president of IBM, financed another trip to South American where Blatchford talked to politicians, labor leaders, and students. The US State Department arranged appointments with officials and the Institute of International Education, a private agency that administers government student exchange programs also provided assistance to Blatchford.

=== Accion sends volunteers to South America ===
In the fall of 1959, Blatchford started rounding up money and volunteers to serve in South America, where he started Accion International, six months before Sargent Shriver started the Peace Corps. The New York Times reported on March 26, 1961, that Accion was sending volunteers to Colombia in a program designed to provide technical aid to urban centers and rural communities. Blatchford said that over 400 students had applied for the program and that screening would soon begin at the University of California, Stanford University, and the University of California at Los Angeles. After selection has been completed, the group would leave for another course of three months at the University of the Andes, then break into two-man teams to serve their communities. Blatchford said the cost of the program would be $125,000 for the first year, with half the money already raised and that under the program each volunteer would receive basic expenses plus a stipend of about $1,100 for fifteen months of duty. Blatchford placed his first volunteers in Venezuela in September 1961. By 1964 Venezuela became the testing ground for Accion's first major project which was to help an urban slum in Venezuela become a self-reliant community. Blatchford first recruited thirty college graduates willing to volunteer overseas. The volunteers lived with families in the barrios, improving their Spanish while familiarizing themselves with problems in the community. The volunteers helped organize projects such as laying water mains, building schools and community centers and starting small businesses. One of their most successful projects was helping a bakery organized in Isaias Medina by twenty women who wanted better and cheaper bread. By 1965 the bakery had become self-supporting. Accion also helped a construction company in the model city of San Tome de Guayana build ten houses as an experiment to increase housing and provide employment for 27 workers.

The New York Times reported on January 28, 1966, that Blatchford had been invited by business leaders in Rio de Janeiro to help organize activities in Brazil based on the Venezuelan model. The businessmen had raised $100,000 and formed a "Centro para Accion" (center for action) in the barrios to be known as CARE after its Portuguese initials. Over the next four years, Accion placed more than 1,000 volunteers and staff members on projects in four countries.

In 1973, Accion staff in Recife, Brazil, began to focus their efforts on helping informal businesses. If these small-scale entrepreneurs could borrow capital at commercial interest rates, they wondered, could they lift themselves out of poverty? An Accion organization in Recife called UNO coined the term “microenterprise” and began issuing small loans. Accion states that, "To our knowledge, these were the first loans that launched the field of microcredit."

Blatchford ran Accion for nine years and at one time during his tenure had 300 volunteers in Latin American and an annual budget of $2 million.

=== Charges of CIA sponsorship retracted ===
On May 23, 1969, Washington columnists Drew Pearson and Jack Anderson charged that the CIA had partially financed Accion and that founding Peace Corps Director Sargent Shriver had issued orders in 1962 to Latin American country directors not to associate with anyone from Accion because it was operating under the guidance of the CIA. Fifty Peace Corps staff members in Washington signed a statement asking Blatchford to "do whatever is necessary to dispel even the spectre of CIA involvement in the Peace Corps." Blatchford replied that he and Accion had never had any association whatever with the CIA or any other intelligence agency and that former Peace Corps directors Sargent Shriver and Jack Vaughn had both stated that the allegation of the 1962 order for Peace Corps to avoid contact with Accion was groundless. On May 31, 1969, Pearson and Anderson admitted in their column that their charge had been in error and retracted their charge. "The inference was based principally on the fact that Accion, founded by new head of the Peace Corps, Joe Blatchford had received $50,000 from the Donner Foundation, a reported CIA conduit," said the article. "We now find that there are two Donner Foundations, and that the William H. Donner Foundation, which contributed to Accion has never been a CIA conduit. We regret the error and further state that we are convinced the Peace Corps has no connection, direct or indirect, with the CIA."

== Peace Corps Director ==
In 1968 Blatchford won the Republican nomination for the House of Representatives from the Los Angeles harbor district but lost the general election in a heavily Democratic district to Glenn M. Anderson in a very close race losing with 48.1% of the vote to Anderson's 50.7%.

In May 1969 Blatchford was appointed Peace Corps director by President Richard Nixon. At Blatchford's confirmation hearings he was questioned closely on his partisan political ambitions but there was no challenge to his qualifications for the post of Peace Corps Director. Blatchford was sworn in on May 5, 1969. "Joe Blatchford, throughout his private career, has had a tremendous interest in this kind of activity, particularly in Latin America," said President Nixon at the swearing in ceremony. "I am very privileged to have him as a member of the administration in this vitally important function. He has the responsibility, despite his very young years, to come up with new ideas. He has the opportunity to develop new programs and those programs will receive the very highest priority within the administration."

=== Serving in the Nixon administration ===
Blatchford was an unusual Nixon appointee. He "lives in Georgetown among Democrats instead of at the Watergate with Administration Republicans" said a profile in the Peace Corps Volunteer magazine in June 1970. "He rides a motorcycle, does impersonations of famous people and has a great nostalgia for San Francisco and its "beat" period. The three most prominent hangings on his office walls are: a photograph of his swearing-in by President Richard Nixon; a copy of the earth-rising. over-moon picture taken by the Crew of Apollo 8 in 1968; and a psychedelic poster of Bob Dylan. A unique office, but one gets the impression he would rather be out in the field." News photographs showed Blatchford riding a black 180cc Yamaha motorcycle into the lobby of Peace Corps headquarters just a few blocks from the White House.

Blatchford had the confidence and support of President Nixon as Peace Corps Director. "I was appointed by the President, and serve at the pleasure of the President. But he has given me a free hand to develop the ideas for making the Peace Corps a vital and exciting means of carrying out its original mission in the 1970's," said Blatchford in 1970. "He has given me plenty of backing on this: He has met with all our county directors, He met the other day with members of our national advisory group, some of our staff. He's spent a good deal of time with us emphasizing the importance of the Peace Corps, and he's particularly emphasized the importance of having returned Volunteers go to work on the problems of American society. In much of the criticism we've received from members of Congress, he's backed me up."

Blatchford used his athletic ability to help forge a working relationship with senior officials in the administration. On May 19, 1970, Blatchford was invited to play in a charity tennis match with Vice President Spiro Agnew. Agnew was known for "beaning" his tennis partner but Blatchford came prepared with a motorcycle helmet on the sidelines. As Blatchford crouched close to the net, an Agnew serve, with all its sting, landed "smack on the back of his head." Blatchford and Agnew lost 6–1, 6–1 to Senator Javits of New York and Representative Weicker of Connecticut. According to a May 1989 Washington Post story by Marci McDonald, the incident prompted Nixon to joke that he should send Agnew into then-war-torn Cambodia armed with a tennis racket.

=== "Untying some Apron Strings" ===
Blatchford immediately set about making changes in Volunteer support services, eliminating some, changing others, and consolidating other services. In a memo to Country Directors Blatchford said "The decisions reached affect a number of services to the Volunteers which in actuality are restrictions on the Volunteers' freedom to manage their own affairs. The decisions are in keeping with the philosophy that we will eliminate all activities which do not directly promote the Volunteers' ability to satisfy their responsibility to the best counbies." Among the services eliminated were Peace Corps booklockers, the pre-service clothing allowance, and payment for unaccompanied air freight and footlockers. Blatchford also eliminated the requirement that volunteers could not return to the United States during their Peace Corps service for vacations. "In principle, the Peace Corps still believes that it is to the Volunteer's advantage, and the advantage of the relationship he must maintain with his host country workers, to vacation within his assigned country or region. At the same time, the restriction on travel to countries such as the US and Europe is undesirable because it discourages Volunteers from assuming full responsibility for important personal decisions relating to Peace Corps service," said the new policy.

=== New directions ===
Blatchford believed that it was time for the Peace Corps to chart a new course called "New Directions." Blatchford said the purpose of "new directions" was to revitalize the Peace Corps by reversing declining trends in both the number of applicants applying to serve as volunteers and the number of requests from host countries for volunteers. "College students know our selection process is slow and impersonal and that we sometimes fail to find solid jobs for our volunteers," Blatchford said.

Blatchford's first priority was to broaden the pool of people joining the Peace Corps. "What's news is that farmers are going to join the Peace Corps, That's different from the public image of the Peace Corps Volunteer as a young liberal arts graduate right out of college," said Blatchford. "When I went overseas, I constantly heard the cry from governments, people of all stripes—villagers, village leaders, school teachers and people who worked with the Peace Corps or were in charge of programming them—that, we need a wide diversity of skills." The New York Times reported on September 23, 1969, at Blatchford's first press conference that the Peace Corps intended to recruit 500 union craftsmen, farmers, and vocational educational specialists.

Blatchford also wanted to increase minority recruitment. "Applications from black colleges are up 70 percent this year. That sounds good. But in absolute numbers, what is it 1 percent to 1.7 percent. That's still not good enough, so we've just set up a special office of minority recruitment," said Blatchford. "We have two intern programs now with Shaw and Atlanta, and last fall we did send the first all black group of Volunteers to Kenya, This is the way of the future, Only we've got to put more effort into it. If we do, I think we can recruit 1000 black Volunteers every year. I think we ought to." At Blatchford's first press conference he said that he would move more vigoursly to recruit minorities. College students "suspect the Peace Corps is almost lily-white and they are right," Blatchford said.

Blatchford also opened the Peace Corps to married couples with children. In his first press conference held on September 23, 1969, Blatchford outlined his plans to place 200 families overseas in a pilot project to attract married technicians. Families had not been permitted to serve overseas previously. "For some people the urge to serve may come again at age 30 or 40 and they have children. We will adjust the living allowance so they can serve," said Blatchford, speaking about blue-collar workers with grown children who previously could not serve in the Peace Corps.

C. Payne Lucas and Kevin Lowther in their seminal book about the Peace Corps from 1960 to 1977, Keeping Kennedy's Promise, noted that although Blatchford said the Peace Corps could only survive by providing more technically skilled volunteers, the great majority of programs continued to be designed around generalists. "Those overseas directors who took New Directions seriously should have spared themselves the trouble. Although Blatchford succeeded in attracting marginally more technically trained people, they were never enough to greatly alter the Peace Corps profile or to fulfill the expectations that New Directions aroused abroad."

=== Vietnam protests ===
Protests against the Vietnam war continued to affect the Peace Corps under Blatchford's administration just as it had under his predecessor, Jack Vaughn. On March 12, 1970, The New York Times disclosed that twelve volunteers had been separated from the Peace Corps because of their public opposition to the Vietnam war. Blatchford reiterated that the Peace Corps would continue its policy of permitting dissent but not if it was done publicly in the host country. "The volunteer can express his dissent," said Blatchford. "But he cannot exploit his position."

Meanwhile, Peace Corps volunteers who had completed their service joined protesters of the Vietnam war in the United States. In May, 1970 more than 100,000 protesters converged on Washington to protest the Kent State shootings and the Nixon administrations incursion into Cambodia. One afternoon a group of returned volunteers came into Peace Corps headquarters and went to the fourth floor which was the Southeast Asia section of the Peace Corps. The returned volunteers, members of an organization called the "Committee of Returned Volunteers," forced staff to leave the floor, hung a Viet Cong flag from a window almost within sight of the White House, and took possession of the entire floor for 36 hours.

The New York Times reported on June 3, 1970, that Blatchford received petitions protesting the war signed by hundreds of volunteers serving in South Korea, Panama, Dominican Republic, and Guatemala. In a two-hour meeting in Blatchford's office, dissenting volunteers told Blatchford that "the war is apparently being expanded, that this is hurting the Peace Corps and that he should do something to reflect the point of view of the many volunteers who oppose the war." A Peace Corps spokesman said that Blatchford told the volunteers that he approved of their form of protest and promised to refer their petitions to the White House. The petition stated that "the President's verbal endorsement of the accomplishments and ideals for the Peace Corps is a hypocritical use of this organization. The government is using us as apologists for policies that run counter to the reasons for our service and the original reasons for the agency's existence."

Blatchford just like Director Vaughn before him believed that volunteers had every right to protest through the media at home as long as they did not publicly identify themselves with political issues in their host countries. But Blatchford came under intense pressure from above after volunteers submitted an anti-war petition to Vice President Spiro Agnew while Agnew was on an official visit to Afghanistan. Blatchford sent a private memorandum to Republican members in Congress explaining that he had "inherited a very difficult situation resulting from Volunteers just out of college with strong, liberal views. We have also had to weed out many members of a hostile staff hired during the past eight years of a Democratic administration unwilling to accept a new administration."

== Action Director ==
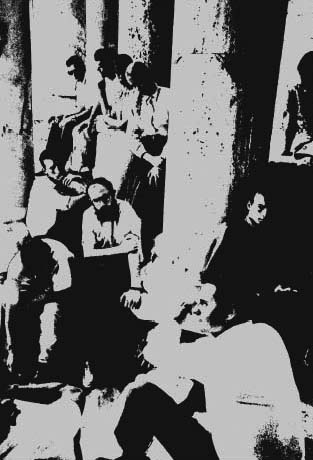
Blatchford (bottom right), third Director of the Peace Corps, meets with Peace Corps Volunteers in Tunisia.

On January 14, 1971, Nixon made a speech at the University of Nebraska proposing to establish a new "volunteer service corps" agency in Washington combining the operations of the Peace Corps, VISTA, and other existing volunteer agencies. Nixon also said he would ask Blatchford, "one of the ablest young men I have ever known," to head the new organization. Nixon said in his speech that the merger would give young Americans "an expanded opportunity for the service they want to give - and it will give them what they not now have offered them - a chance to transfer between service abroad and service at home." In a special memo to staff members and volunteers, Blatchford praised Nixon's announcement as "another step in the effort to bring the American citizen into the solution of public problems through long-term service."

=== Merger of Peace Corps into Action ===
On March 24, 1971, Nixon officially requested Congress to act on the plan for merging nine volunteer programs: the Peace Corps; VISTA and a small special program from the Office of Economic Opportunity; Foster Grandparents and the Retired Senior Volunteer Program from the Department of Health, Education, and Welfare; and the Service Corps of Retired Executives and the Active Corps of Executives from the Small Business Administration. In addition, the Teacher Corps in the Office of Education was also proposed for inclusion but was not included in the first phase of the reorganization plan. The new agency would centralize management of 15,000 full-time and 10,000 part-time volunteers into a new agency with a budget of $176 million, equal to the budgets of the nine present agencies plus $20 million for innovation. Formally the new agency was called "Action" but officials insisted it would be called "Action Corps." The reorganization would take place automatically unless either house of Congress objected within 60 legislative days. In a special message to Congress, Nixon called for still larger future efforts. "America must enlist the ideals, the energy, the experience and the skills of its people on a larger scale than it ever has in the past."

Blatchford endorsed the new agency unwilling to question any plan of President Nixon who Blatchford thought supported the Peace Corps. Blatchford believed that combining the Peace Corps with domestic programs like VISTA might shield it from critics of foreign aid by adding VISTA supporters to its constituency. The Peace Corps was isolated and vulnerable and Blatchford thought the Peace Corps "would survive better under Action." On June 3, 1971, the Senate gave final congressional approval to Action by a vote of 54 to 29. Opposition to the merger was led by liberal Democrats who thought the reorganization would diminish volunteer interest in the various programs and permit the Administration to dismantle VISTA which had been under the Office of Economic Opportunity. On November 20, 1971, the Senate confirmed Blatchford as Director of Action.

=== Budget crisis at the Peace Corps ===
Historian Elizabeth Cobbs Hoffman, in her book All You Need is Love: The Peace Corps and the Spirit of the 1960s, says that Nixon had decided to dismantle the Peace Corps. In July 1970, Nixon instructed Bob Haldeman to get Bryce Harlow on the job of getting the Peace Corps "chopped per the president's instructions" adding that "this has to be done and has to be done now...We can't do it just before the '72 elections and we have to do it after November 1970." Haldeman told subordinates to cut the budget by one-third and noted in his diary that the president wanted the budget cut "down far enough to decimate them." Two months after the November 1970 elections the plan went into action. Blatchford received the proposed federal budget for FY72 and to his surprise, the Office of Management and Budget (OMB) had cut the number of Peace Corps volunteers from 9,000 to 5,800 and reduced the Peace Corps' budget from $90 million to $60 million. Blatchford dashed off a memo to John Ehrlichman, special assistant to the president on domestic affairs pleading for preservation of the Peace Corps at its current budget level. "It will be quite evident to most Congressmen and to the public that the president's expansion of service opportunities has begun with a 30 percent cut over last year's request for the largest of the merged agencies," wrote Blatchford.

Congress had its own plan to cut the Peace Corps' budget. On December 17, 1971, Congress passed a continuing resolution slashing Blatchford's $82 million operating budget by $10 million. "Our whole budget doesn't amount to half the price of a submarine," said Blatchford. "Those characters over at the Defense Department are rolling in dough. They round off their cost estimates to the nearest Peace Corps budget." Blatchford ordered a temporary halt to signing up new volunteers although applications continued to be accepted. Then Blatchford ordered that plans be drawn up for the termination of half of the 8,000 volunteers in the field. The plans would be implemented if Congress failed to restore the Peace Corps' funds. "There is a point of no return when we must use the money we have to bring these people back to the United States," said one Peace Corps official.

It was time for Blatchford to play hardball. Blatchford announced that 2,313 volunteers stationed in thirty-three countries were being brought home. Blatchford cleared the diplomatic cables with the State Department and arranged to send them one minute past midnight on March 7, 1972, for volunteers to return home by April 1, 1972. The removal of Peace Corps volunteers would be an international embarrassment to the United States of enormous proportions. Congressman Otto Passman, a longtime opponent of the Peace Corps, called Blatchford on March 7, the day the cables were to go out, and offered the Peace Corps extra funds if Blatchford would take the heat off. Passman also told Blatchford that the Peace Corps didn't have as many friends in the White House as he thought. According to Historian Elizabeth Cobbs Hoffman, Blatchford never suspected that his problems came from the White House and remained convinced that President Nixon was a friend of the Peace Corps.

P. David Searles in his book The Peace Corps Experience: Challenge and Change, 1969-1976 says that Blatchford's own assessment of Nixon's support 25 years later is that President Nixon did lose some of his early enthusiasm for the Peace Corps as a result of what Nixon thought of as widespread hostility to the president from Peace Corps Volunteers. However Baltchford also contends that Nixon originally gave more support to the Peace Corps than any President other than Kennedy. Blatchford also credits Republicans in the Senate like Barry Goldwater and Charles Percy for supporting the Peace Corps when Democrat William Fulbright tried to cut the Peace Corps' budget in 1969. Blatchford did sense hostility to the Peace Corps from some of the president's advisors, especially Ehrlichman and Patrick Buchanan, but says it did not hamper his work.

=== Five-year rule ===
On November 15, 1971, The New York Times reported that Blatchford had made the decision to rigorously enforce a 1965 rule that staff and volunteer service in the Peace Corps be limited to five years. About 10 per cent of the total Peace Corps administrative staff, including 27 of the 55 country directors, were affected by the decision. A total of 93 of the Peace Corps' senior staff will be dismissed as a result of the rule. In a memorandum announcing his decision, Blatchford called on staff members with over five years service to "relinquish their position so that others may serve." "Only in the rarest instances involving senior policymakers who cannot be readily replaced, will there be any deviation from a strict adherence to the spirit of the five-year rule." The move came under criticism from Sargent Shriver, the founding Director of the Peace Corps and originator of the "Five Year Rule." "The rule should have been enforced across the board from the start," said Shriver. "To do it abruptly now is going to create major problems overseas. It's one hell of a job to find 27 competent overseas directors in the course of six months, and these people are the core of the program.

Historian Elizabeth Cobbs Hoffman in her book All You Need is Love: The Peace Corps and the Spirit of the 1960s says that if the Peace Corps hoped to survive beyond the sixties, it would need to give Republicans a greater stake in its survival. "Republicans had to be allowed the spoils of the election - and the Peace Corps, like it or not, was one of them," says Cobbs Hoffman. "Shriver and Vaughn, after all, had filled the Corps with Democrats. Still, Blatchford showed a restraint that earned him a few points with old Peace corps staff by agreeing to take on those Republicans with demonstrateble qualifications for the job. Blatchford enforced the five-year rule to a greater extent than Vaughn, but when key staff resigned or had their terms expire he also promoted from within."

P. David Searles in his book The Peace Corps Experience: Challenge and Change, 1969-1976 says that the five-year rule required that all staff members leave the Peace Corps not later than the fifth anniversary on the date they were hired and even Shriver observed this rule when he stepped down as the first Peace Corps director on March 1, 1966, five years after becoming director to the day. Searles said that Blatchford saw the five-year rule as one way to help assemble his own team, just as Jack Vaughn had done when he became director in 1966. "The loudest and most outraged of political partisanship came in 1971 when Blatchford used an important Peace Corps policy, generally ignored by his predecessor, to terminate nearly one hundred staff members, including twenty-seven country directors. The rule was instituted to ensure that the agency would never suffer the fate of other government bureaucracies: premature calcification resulting from an aged and spent permanent staff." Author P. David Searles says that Shriver's concerns about finding "competent overseas directors" proved groundless.

=== Resignation ===
Blatchford's remaining tenure as Action Director was uneventful; except for one unusual opportunity to present the Peace Corps through mass media to the American people that occurred on February 16, 1972. Blatchford appeared on the Mike Douglas Show at the invitation of John Lennon and Yoko Ono, who hosted the program for a week. He spoke about his vision for the Peace Corps, and his belief in service, foreign aid, and cross-cultural understanding and partnership. In describing his philosophy, he said, “We simply present ourselves as people. We have a great faith that not with a government label or any religion or any ideology that we can come across. And not just on a tour, you know, or a goodwill thing. We find if we stay in a town or village overseas and really remain there, we become acculturated to them, and they to us, and we start working together, whether we’re building a school or putting in a water main, or training someone in a job, the cultural barriers start breaking down, and in the long run that’s maybe the way we’re going to find world peace.” Another guest on the same show with Blatchford was one of Lennon's idols, Chuck Berry, who dueted with Lennon on Berry's big hit "Memphis Tennessee" during the two hour program.

After Nixon's overwhelming victory in the presidential election in November 1972, Nixon called for the resignation of all his appointees. Blatchford recalls telling a colleague at a meeting where the resignations were demanded, "But I thought we won." Whether Blatchford would have been re-appointed at Director of Action will never be known because Blatchford accompanied his pro forma resignation with a real one. Blatchford was an enigma in the Nixon administration, a Republican who held ideas that seemed liberal. He had resisted pressure to bust heads when the Committee of Returned Volunteers had occupied Peace Corps Headquarters in 1969 and Nixon's Chief of Staff H. R. Haldeman considered Blatchford "soft" in dealing with dissent. Whatever the outcome, Blatchford had taken himself out of the running and on November 21, 1972, Blatchford announced that he was resigning as head of the Action Corps effective December 31, 1972. A source added that Blatchford had been urged by a number of people to enter the Los Angeles mayoral race.

== Post governmental career ==
In 1974, Blatchford helped Republican Houston Flournoy campaign for Governor of California. In 1974 Blatchford also looked into the California Senate race but found that money to promote a young candidate was unavailable. "Nobody tended to think the Republicans could win this year, even before Watergate," said Blatchford. "We've had a Republican administration in the state for eight years, the Nixon Administration in Washington for six. So the tide is going the other way anyway. Watergate is an add-on, another reason to be discouraged."

In 1977, Blatchford founded his private law practice, Summit Communications, in the field of international trade and public affairs. Blatchford has represented "flower growers in Costa Rica, cement and toy balloon producers in Mexico, leather handbag exporters in Colombia, school ring binder makers in Singapore, and petrochemicals firms in Argentina."

In 1978, Blatchford represented 13 defectors from Reverend Jim Jones' cult who were with Congressman Leo Ryan when he was killed at the airstrip near Jonestown in Guyana.

In 1983, Blatchford joined the law and lobbying Firm of O’Connor & Hannan, where he assisted his clients, including many foreign governments, in obtaining U.S. economic assistance and maintaining U.S. markets for their products.

In 1989, Blatchford was the principal lawyer for his firm representing Alfredo Cristiani, the president of El Salvador. Before Blatchford agreed to represent Cristiani, Blatchford assured himself that the president was not associated with any death squad activity that had been imputed to Cristiani's political party, Arena. Blatchford lobbied against a Senate effort to reduce some of the $400 million in annual aid to El Salvador because of the slaying of six priests in El Salvador. "I'm confident I was representing a good group of people," said Blatchford.

Blatchford was active in helping negotiate and obtain passage of the North American Free Trade Agreement (NAFTA), the Caribbean Basin Initiative (CBI), and the Andean Trade Preference (ATPA). Blatchford was also the co-founder of Caribbean/Latin American Action (CLAA), which fosters trade and economic growth development in the Caribbean Basin, and was the Deputy Undersecretary of the Department of Commerce.

Throughout his career, Blatchford received numerous honorary degrees and in 2019 he received the Albert Nelson Marquis Lifetime Achievement Award by Marquis Who's Who.

== Personal life ==
In 1967 Blatchford married the former Winifred A. Marich, whom he met while working with Accion in Venezuela. The Blatchfords have four children: Andrea, Nicholas, and Antonia Blatchford, and Anwar McQueen. Joe has twin sisters. Beatrice Ballance is a television and stage actress. Barbara Winslow is a Psychotherapist. Blatchford is a serious opera and jazz fan. Joseph Blatchford died on October 7, 2020.

== Citations ==
Government offices
| Preceded by Jack Vaughn | Director of the Peace Corps; 1969–1971 | Succeeded by Kevin O'Donnell |
