= Mayflies (novel) =

1979 novel by Kevin O'Donnell Jr

First edition (publ. Berkley Books) Cover art by Vincent Di Fate

Mayflies is a novel by Kevin O'Donnell Jr. published in 1979.

== Plot summary ==
Mayflies is a novel in which the brain of a scientist is preserved after his accidental death, and is then reprogrammed and used as the computer for a starship.

== Reception ==
Greg Costikyan reviewed Mayflies in Ares Magazine #3 and commented that "It is [...] the fascinating portrayal of the development of a society. O'Donnell has a master's touch; I recommend Mayflies highly."

== Reviews ==
- Review by Norman Spinrad (1980) in Destinies, Spring 1980
- Review by Dave Langford (1980) in Foundation, #20 October 1980
- Review by Sue Beckman (1981) in Science Fiction Review, Fall 1981
- Kliatt
