= Reefs (novel) =

1981 novel by Kevin O'Donnell Jr.

Reefs is a novel by Kevin O'Donnell Jr. published in 1981.

== Plot summary ==
Reefs is a novel in which McGill Feighan explores his own unusual heritage.

== Reception ==
Greg Costikyan reviewed Reefs in Ares Magazine #12 and commented that "O'Donnell is an entertaining and talented writer, though I fear the Journeys is not his best work. Too, in Reefs he turns McGill's teleportation ability into a veritable weapon of mass destruction, making McGill almost invulnerable to anything that might happen to him."

== Reviews ==
- Review by Sue Beckman (1982) in Science Fiction Review, Summer 1982
