= 1979 oil crisis =

Worldwide increase in crude oil prices following the Iranian Revolution

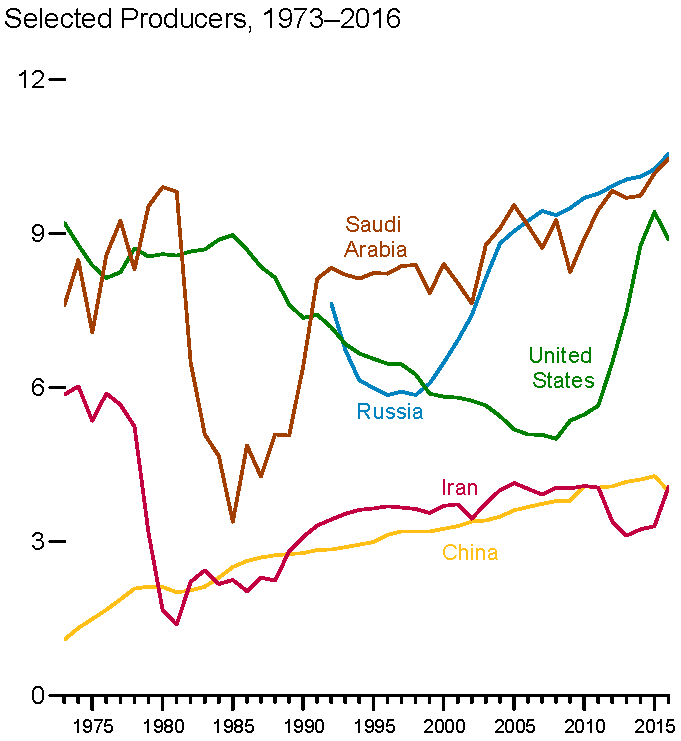
- A graph of top oil-producing countries, showing a drop in Iran's production.
- Date: 1979–1980
- Also known as: Second oil crisis

The 1979 oil crisis, sometimes referred to as the second oil crisis (in reference to the 1973 oil crisis), refers to the drop in oil production in the aftermath of the Iranian Revolution that led to an energy crisis in 1979. Although the global oil supply only decreased by approximately four percent, the oil markets' reaction raised the price of crude oil drastically over the next 12 months, more than doubling it to $39.50 per barrel ($248/m^{3}), equivalent to $175 per barrel ($1,101/m^{3}) in 2025. The sudden increase in price was connected with fuel shortages similar to the 1973 oil crisis.

In 1980, following the onset of the Iran–Iraq War, oil production in Iran fell drastically. Iraq's oil production also dropped significantly, triggering economic recessions worldwide. Oil prices did not return to pre-crisis levels until the mid-1980s.

Oil prices after 1980 began a steady decline over the next 20 years, except for a brief uptick during the Gulf War, which then reached a 60% fall-off in the 1990s. Mexico, Nigeria, and Venezuela's major oil exporters expanded their production during this time. The Soviet Union became the largest oil producer in the world, and oil from the North Sea and Alaska flooded the market.

== Iran ==
In November 1978, a strike by 37,000 workers at Iran's nationalized oil refineries reduced production from 6 million barrels (950,000 m^{3}) per day to about 1.5 million barrels (240,000 m^{3}). Foreign workers left the country. By bringing navy personnel into crude oil production operations, the government fixed short-term disruptions and by end of November the output came back to almost normal level.

On January 16, 1979, the Shah of Iran, Mohammad Reza Pahlavi, and his wife, Farah Pahlavi, left Iran at the behest of Prime Minister Shapour Bakhtiar, who sought to calm the situation. After the departure of the Shah, Ayatollah Khomeini became the new leader of Iran. A year later, a war broke out between Iran and Iraq that curtailed oil output in the Gulf Region. Within this armed conflict, both nations engaged in a tanker war until 1988.

== Effects ==
=== Other OPEC members ===
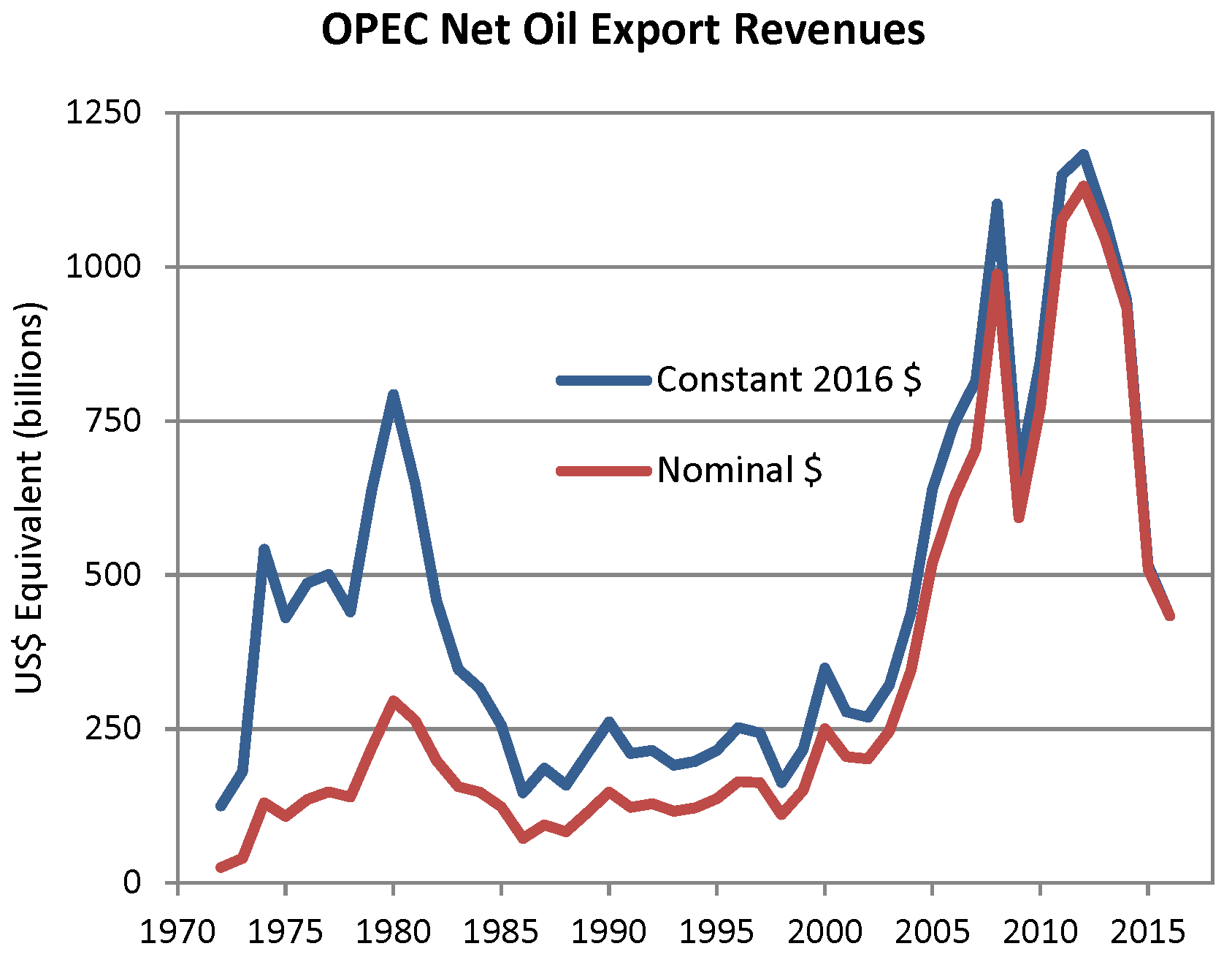
Fluctuations of OPEC net oil export revenues from 1972 to 2017.

The rise in oil prices benefited a few members of the Organization of Petroleum-Exporting Countries (OPEC), which made record profits. Under the new Iranian government, oil exports later resumed but production was inconsistent and at a lower volume, further raising prices. Saudi Arabia and other OPEC nations, under the presidency of Mana Al Otaiba, increased production to offset most of the decline, and by early 1979 the overall loss in worldwide production was roughly four percent.

The war between Iran and Iraq in 1980 caused a further 7 percent drop in worldwide production. OPEC production was surpassed by other exporters such as the United States, as OPEC member nations were divided amongst themselves. Saudi Arabia, a "swing producer", tried to gain back the market share after 1985, increasing production and causing downward pressure on prices, making high-cost oil production facilities less profitable.

=== United States ===
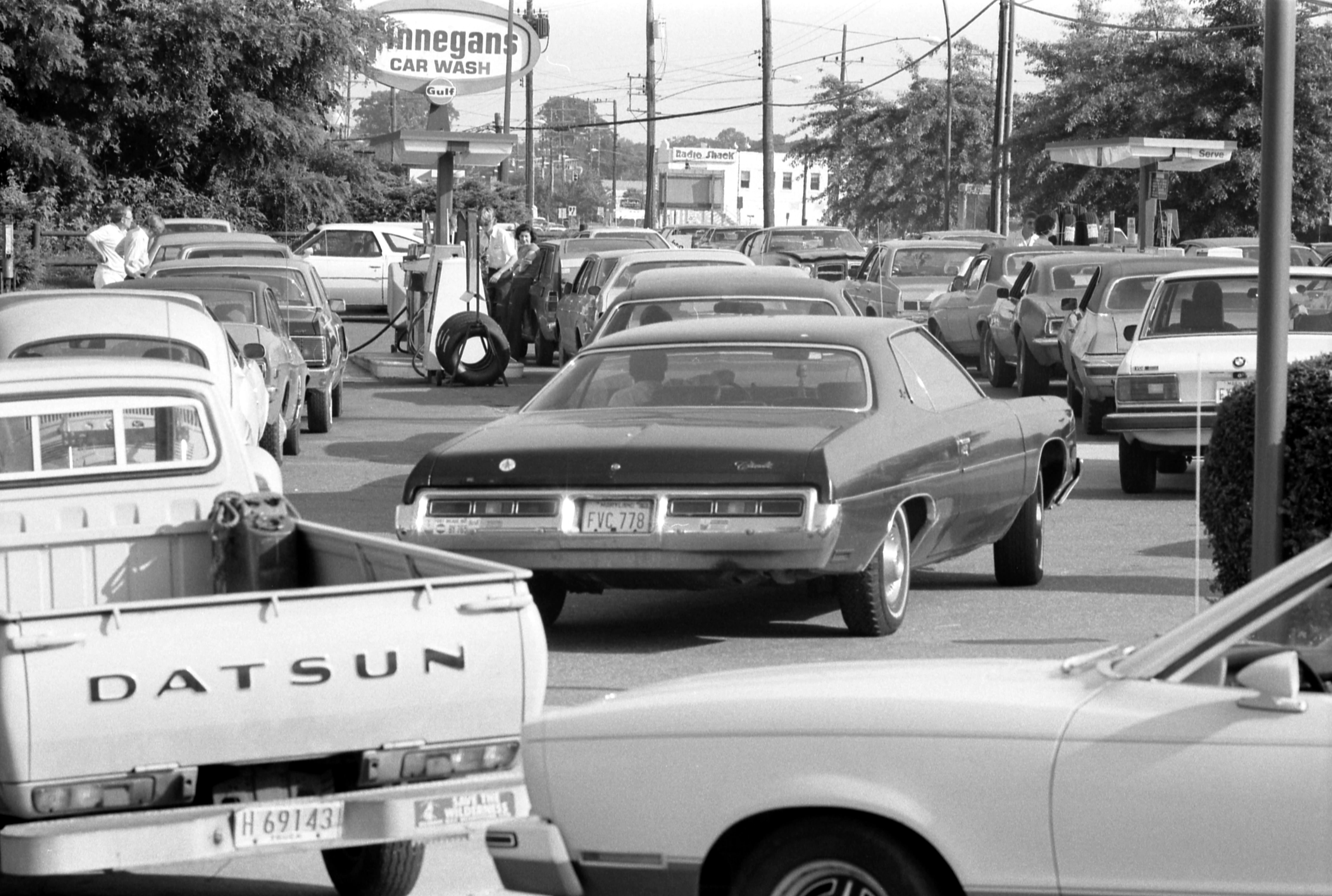
A line at a gas station in Maryland, United States, June 15, 1979

The oil crisis had a mixed impact on the United States. Richard Nixon had imposed price controls on domestic oil as a result of the 1973 oil crisis. Since then, gasoline price controls had been repealed, but those on domestic oil remained.

The Jimmy Carter administration began a phased deregulation of oil prices on April 5, 1979, when the average price of crude oil was US$15.85 per barrel ($100/m^{3}). Starting with the Iranian revolution, the price of crude oil rose to $39.50 per barrel ($248/m^{3}) over the next 12 months (its all-time highest real price until March 3, 2008). Deregulating domestic oil price controls allowed U.S. oil output to rise sharply from the large Prudhoe Bay fields, while oil imports fell sharply.

Although not directly related, the near-disaster at Three Mile Island on March 28, 1979, also increased anxiety about energy policy and availability. Due to memories of the oil shortage in 1973, motorists soon began panic buying, and long lines appeared at gas stations, as they had six years earlier. The average vehicle of the time consumed between two and three liters (about 0.5–0.8 gallons) of gasoline an hour while idling, and it was estimated that Americans wasted up to 150,000 barrels (24,000 m^{3}) of oil per day idling their engines in the lines at gas stations.

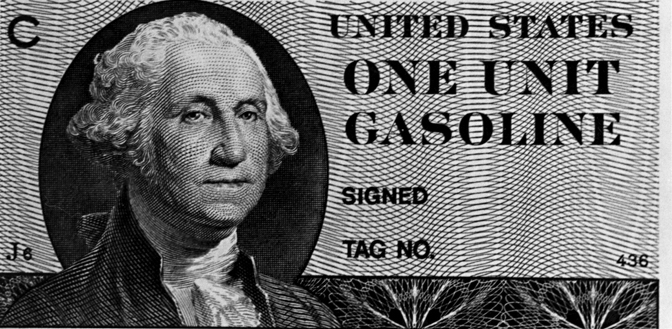
A gas coupon that was printed but not issued during the 1979 energy crisis

In 1979, the amount of oil sold in the United States was only 3.5 percent less than the record set for oil sold in 1978. A telephone poll of 1,600 American adults conducted by the Associated Press and NBC News and released in early May 1979 found that only 37 percent of Americans thought the energy shortages were real, nine percent were not sure, and 54 percent thought the energy shortages were a hoax.

Many politicians proposed gas rationing. One such proponent was Harry Hughes, Governor of Maryland, who proposed odd-even rationing (only people with an odd-numbered license plate could purchase gas on an odd-numbered day), as was used during the 1973 Oil Crisis. Several states implemented odd-even gas rationing, including California, Pennsylvania, New York, New Jersey, Oregon, and Texas. Coupons for gasoline rationing were printed but were never actually used during the 1979 crisis.

On July 15, 1979, President Carter outlined his plans to reduce oil imports and improve energy efficiency in his "Crisis of Confidence" speech, sometimes known as the "malaise" speech. In the speech, Carter encouraged citizens to do what they could to reduce their use of energy. He had already installed water tank heating solar panels on the roof of the White House and a wood-burning stove in the living quarters. The panels were removed in 1986, reportedly for roof maintenance, during the administration of his successor, Ronald Reagan.

A speech Carter gave in April 1977 argued that the oil crisis was "the moral equivalent of war". In November 1979, Iranian revolutionaries seized the American Embassy, and Carter imposed an embargo on Iranian oil. In January 1980, he issued the Carter Doctrine, declaring: "An attempt by any outside force to gain control of the Persian Gulf region will be regarded as an assault on the vital interests of the United States". Additionally, as part of his administration's efforts at deregulation, Carter proposed removing price controls that had been imposed by the Richard Nixon administration before the 1973 crisis. Carter agreed to remove price controls in phases. They were fully dismantled in 1981 under Reagan. Carter also said he would impose a windfall profit tax on oil companies. While the regulated price of domestic oil was kept to $6 a barrel, the world market price was $30.

In 1980, the U.S. government established the Synthetic Fuels Corporation to produce an alternative to imported fossil fuels.

When the price of West Texas Intermediate crude oil increased 250 percent between 1978 and 1980, the oil-producing areas of Texas, Oklahoma, Louisiana, Colorado, Wyoming, and Alaska began experiencing an economic boom and population inflows.

According to a 2019 study, individuals who were between the ages of 15 and 18 during the 1979 oil crisis were substantially less likely to use cars once they were in their mid-30s.

=== Other oil-consuming nations ===
In response to the high oil prices of the 1970s, industrial nations took steps to reduce their dependence on the Organization of Petroleum-Exporting Countries (OPEC) oil. Electric utilities worldwide switched from oil to coal, natural gas, or nuclear power. National governments initiated multibillion-dollar research programs to develop alternatives to oil and commercial exploration developed major non-OPEC oilfields in Siberia, Alaska, North Sea, and the Gulf of Mexico.

By 1986, daily worldwide demand for oil dropped by 5 million barrels but, non-OPEC production rose by an even-larger amount. Consequently, OPEC's market share reduced from 50 percent in 1979 to 29 percent in 1985.

=== Automobile fuel economy ===
At the time, Detroit's "Big Three" automakers (Ford, Chrysler, GM) were marketing downsized full-sized automobiles like the Chevrolet Caprice, the Ford LTD Crown Victoria and the Dodge St. Regis which met the CAFE fuel economy mandates passed in 1978. Detroit's response to the growing popularity of imported compacts like the Toyota Corolla and the Volkswagen Rabbit was the Chevrolet Citation and the Ford Fairmont. Ford replaced the Ford Pinto with the Ford Escort and Chrysler, on the verge of bankruptcy, introduced the Dodge Aries K.

GM was having unfavorable market reactions to the Citation and introduced the Chevrolet Corsica and Chevrolet Beretta in 1987 which sold better. GM also replaced the Chevrolet Monza, introducing the 1982 Chevrolet Cavalier which was better received. Ford experienced a similar market rejection of the Fairmont and introduced the front-wheel-drive Ford Tempo in 1984.

Detroit was not well prepared for the sudden rise in fuel prices, and imported brands, primarily the Asian models, which were mass-marketed and had a lower manufacturing cost as opposed to British and West German brands. The rising value of the Deutsche mark and British pound resulted in the transition to the rise of Japanese manufacturers as they were able to export their product from Japan at a lower cost, resulting in profitable gains, despite accusations of price dumping, and were now more widely available in North America, and developing a loyal customer base.

A year after the 1979 Iranian Revolution, Japanese manufacturers surpassed Detroit's production totals, becoming first in the world. The share of Japanese cars in U.S. auto purchases rose from 9 percent in 1976 to 21 percent in 1980. Japanese exports later displaced the automotive market once dominated by lower-tier European manufacturers (Renault, Fiat, Opel, Peugeot, MG, Triumph, Citroen). Some declared bankruptcy (e.g. Triumph, Simca) or withdraw from the U.S. market, especially in the wake of grey market automobiles or the inability of the vehicle to meet DOT requirements, from emission requirements to automotive lighting. Many imported brands utilized fuel-saving technologies such as fuel injection and multi-valve engines over the common use of carburetors. The overall fuel economy of cars in the United States increased from about 15 miles per US gallon (16 L/100 km; 18 mpg_{‑imp}) in 1979 to 18 mpg_{‑US} (13 L/100 km; 22 mpg_{‑imp}) by 1985 and 20 mpg_{‑US} (12 L/100 km; 24 mpg_{‑imp}) by 1990. This was one factor leading to the subsequent 1980s oil glut.

== See also ==
- 1979 world oil market chronology
- 1973 oil crisis
- 1980s oil glut
- 2000s energy crisis
- 2026 Iran war
- Carless days in New Zealand
- Energy crisis
- Energy diplomacy
- Hubbert peak theory
- Iran hostage crisis
