= Kevin O'Donnell Jr. =

American novelist (1950–2012)

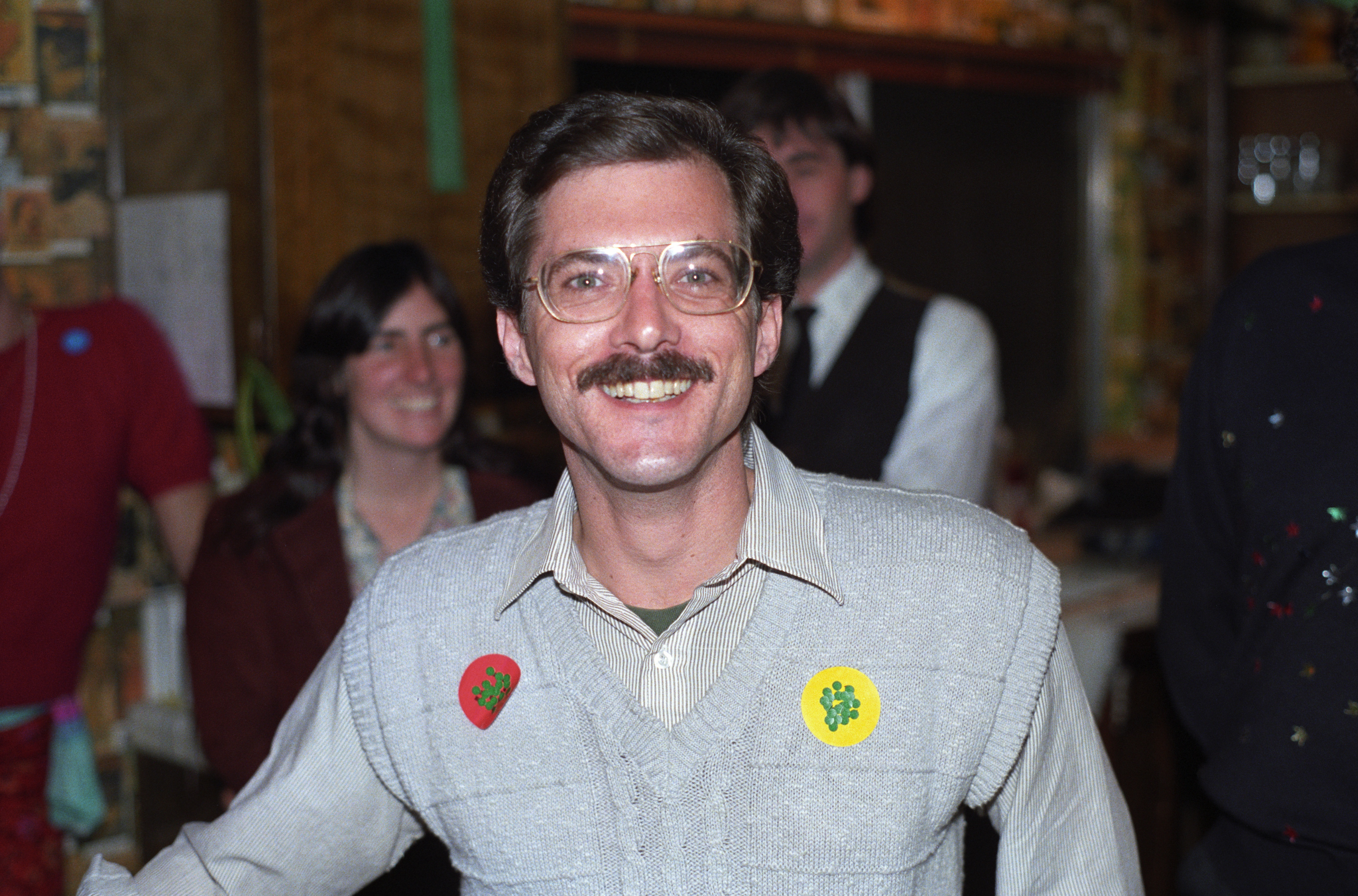
- O'Donnell in 1986
- Born: November 29, 1950; Cleveland, Ohio, US
- Died: November 7, 2012 (aged 61); Cleveland, Ohio
- Occupation: Writer
- Relatives: Kevin O'Donnell (father)

Kevin O'Donnell Jr. (November 29, 1950 – November 7, 2012) was an American science fiction author.

== Early life, family and education ==
O'Donnell was the son of Kevin O'Donnell, who served as director of the Peace Corps in 1971–72.

Kevin Jr. graduated from Yale University in 1972.

== Career ==
Periodicals ranging from Alfred Hitchcock's Mystery Magazine to Omni have printed more than 70 of Kevin O'Donnell Jr.'s shorter works. A number have also been anthologized, both in the US and internationally. He has published ten books in the US that have been reprinted in the UK, France, Israel, the Netherlands, Spain, and Germany. In February 1987, the French translation of his 1984 novel ORA:CLE received the 1987 Prix Litteraire Mannesmann Tally.

O'Donnell served as chairman of the Nebula Award Novel Jury of the Science Fiction Writers of America (SFWA) in 1990 and 1991. He chaired the Nebula Award Committee from 1990 until 1998, and acted as Business Manager of SFWA's quarterly publication, the Bulletin, from October 1994 until July 1998. Sporadically in the late 1990s, he helped maintain SFWA's website. In August 1999, he was appointed Chairman of SFWA's Grievance Committee; he retired from that position on August 15, 2005. On April 30, 2005, he received the Service to SFWA Award. After his death, the award was renamed in his honor.

The Lunar Resources Company appointed him to its board of directors in November 1994. He was its Acting Business Manager from January 1998 to October 1999.

== Personal life and demise ==
O'Donnell died of lung cancer in Cleveland, Ohio, on November 7, 2012.

== Work ==
=== Novels ===
- Bander Snatch, Bantam Books, June 1979 ISBN 0-553-12620-2
- Mayflies, Berkley Books, December 1979 ISBN 0-425-04290-1
  - 2nd edition, December 1982 ISBN 0-425-05776-3
  - (in Hebrew) מייפלאואר, Am Oved Publishers Ltd., 1985
  - (in Spanish) Efimeras, Ultramar Editores SA, July 1989 ISBN 84-7386-533-2.
- Caverns (The Journeys of McGill Feighan, Book I), Berkley Books, April 1981 ISBN 0-425-04730-X
  - 4th edition, August 1984 ISBN 0-425-07469-2
  - (in German) Retzglaran, Droemersche Verlagsanstalt Th. Knaur Nachf., July 1985 ISBN 3-426-05813-8
- Reefs (The Journeys of McGill Feighan, Book II), Berkley Books, October 1981 ISBN 0-425-05059-9.
  - 2nd edition, January 1983 ISBN 0-425-06235-X
  - (in German) Die Wasserwelt, Droemersche Verlagsanstalt Th. Knaur Nachf., October 1985 ISBN 3-426-05830-8
- War of Omission, Bantam Books, March 1982 ISBN 0-553-20281-2
  - (in German) Der Tisser-Krieg, Wilhelm Heyne Verlag GmbH & Co. KG, Munich, 1995 ISBN 3-453-08577-9.
- Lava (The Journeys of McGill Feighan, Book III), Berkley Books, April 1982 ISBN 0-425-05248-6
  - 2nd edition, August 1984 ISBN 0-425-07470-6
  - (in German) Der Pflanzenmönch, Droemersche Verlagsanstalt Th. Knaur Nachf., July 1986
- ORA:CLE, Berkley Books, August 1984 ISBN 0-425-07260-6
  - (in Dutch) ORA:KEL, Meulenhoff-Nederland bv., January 1986
  - (in French) Ora : cle, Editions Robert Laffont, June 1986 (1987 Prix Litteraire Mannesmann Tally)
  - (United Kingdom), Grafton Books, July 1986
  - (in Spanish), Ultramar Editores SA, October 1987
- Cliffs (The Journeys of McGill Feighan, Book IV), Berkley Books, February 1986 ISBN 0-425-08387-X
- The Shelter (with Mary Kittredge), Tor Books, August 1987 ISBN 0-8125-2066-1
  - (in Spanish) El Refugio, Ultramar Editores SA, February 1990
- Fire on the Border, Roc Books, September 1990 ISBN 0-451-45030-2

=== Non-fiction ===
- The Electronic Money Machine (with The Haven Group), Avon Books, March 1984 ISBN 0-380-86751-6.

=== Short fiction ===
- "The Hand Is Quicker", Analog, October 1973
  - Reprinted as "Plus rapide que la main" in Tschai Fanzine de science-fiction, No. 3, March 1975
- "Alternate", Alfred Hitchcock's Mystery Magazine, August 1975
  - Alfred Hitchcock's Words of Prey (Anthology #21/Summer 1986), Davis Publications, 1986
- "Hear No Evil", Alfred Hitchcock's Mystery Magazine, October 1975
- "The Tripper", Analog, October 1975
- "Time Waits For No Man", Alfred Hitchcock's Mystery Magazine, November 1975
  - Alfred Hitchcock's Shrouds and Pockets (Anthology #26/Winter 1988), Davis Publications, 1988
- "Shattered Hopes, Broken Dreams", Galaxy, January 1976
- "A Matter of Pride", Analog, February 1976
- "Hunger on the Homestretch", Galaxy, March 1976
- "Brief Respite", Cavalier, June 1976
  - Cavalier Annual, 1977
- "Next Door Neighbor", Galileo, September 1976
- "Border Crosser", Cavalier, October 1976
- "In Xanadu", Galaxy, November 1976
- "Night Shift", Orbit 19, 1977
- "The Night Callers", Galileo, April 1977
- "A Meeting of Minds", Galaxy, June 1977
  - (in German) Ullstein Stories '80, Ullstein 1983
- "Low Grade Ore", Isaac Asimov's Science Fiction Magazine, 1977
  - Asimov's Choice: Black Holes & Bug-eyed Monsters, Davis Publications, 1977
  - Isaac Asimov's Science Fiction Anthology, Davis Publications, 1978
  - Science Fiction Masterpieces, ed. Isaac Asimov, Galahad, 1986 ISBN 0-88365-713-9
- "Information Station Sabbath", Analog, August 1977
- "Report to the Director", Empire #11, 1977
- "Shadow Play", Swank, December 1977
- "The Gift of Prometheus", Analog, January 1978
  - Licht des Tages, Licht des Todes, Werner Fuchs ed., Droemersche (Knaur), 1982
- "The Looking Glass of the Law", Amazing/Fantastic, January 1978
  - The Survival of Freedom, Jerry Pournelle & John F Carr eds., Fawcett, 1981
  - 101 Science Fiction Stories, Martin H Greenberg, Charles G Waugh, & Jenny-Lynn Waugh eds., Avenel Books, 1986
- "Quinera 3", Analog, February 1978
- "Do Not Go Gentle", Galileo, March 1978
  - second place, Galileo's 1977 short-short story contest
  - Starry Messenger: The Best of Galileo, Charles C Ryan ed., St Martin's Press, 1979
- "Far From the Madding Crowd", Galileo, May 1978
  - Midnight Zoo, Volume #1, Issue #2 (March/April 1991)
- "Stalking the Timelines", Analog, September 1978
- "Tunnels of the Minds", Galileo, September 1978
- "Listen to the Rain" (with Al Sirois), Tesseract, 1978
- "The Dead of Winter", Isaac Asimov's SF Magazine, May 1979
- "Temple Guardian", Analog, June 1979
  - The Spear of Mars (The Future At War, Vol 2), Reginald Bretnor ed., Ace Books, 1980; Baen Books, July 1988
- "An Equivalent Reality" (with Robert P King), Confrontation, 1979
- "Three Aliens", Destinies Vol I #5, October/December 1979
- "Old Friends", Analog, November 1979
- "The Raindrop's Role", Isaac Asimov's SF Magazine, November 1979
- "Judo and the Art of Self-Government", Destinies Vol II #1, Feb/Mar 1980
  - Laughing Space, Isaac Asimov & JO Jeppson eds., Houghton Mifflin, 1982
- "Marchianna", OMNI, June 1980
  - The Best of OMNI Science Fiction, No 4, 1982
  - (in German) Kopernikus 6, Moewig, 1982
- "Bloodsong" (with Barry B Longyear), Isaac Asimov's SF Magazine, December 1980
- "Tears for Emily", Destinies Vol III No. 1, April 1981
- "Younggold", Berkley Showcase, Vol 4, July 1981
- "Encroachment", Berkley Showcase, Vol 5, October 1982
- "Oft in Offwana" (with Al Sirois), Isaac Asimov's SF Magazine, February 1983
- "Linehan Alone", Amazing/Fantastic, July 1984
- "Thy Neighbor's Assets", Analog, April 1985
- "Raccoons", Amazing Stories, July 1986
- "Rock Garden", OMNI, July 1986
- "The Million Dollar Day", Analog, October 1987
- "Fradero Goes Home", Analog, May 1988
- "Alone and Lame in Diidekland", Pulphouse, 1989
- "Future's Puppet", Analog, September 1989
- "Useful Life", Analog, October 1989
- "A Question of Balance", Analog, July 1990
- "The Original Magic", Amazing Stories, September 1990
- "The Important Things in Life", New Destinies, Volume IX/Fall 1990
- "The Pieces of the Puzzle", The Magazine of Fantasy & Science Fiction, November 1990
- "Who's the Boss?" (by Thomas Bolton) Variations, March 1992 (Vol 14, #3)
- "Little Brother's Turn to Watch", AMAZING Stories, June 1992 (Vol LXVII, No 3)
- "Moss Under Bamboo: Twilight", Midnight Zoo, September 1992 (Vol 2, #3)
- "'Saur Spot", Dinosaur Fantastic, Mike Resnick & Martin H Greenberg eds., DAW, July 1993
- "An Appetite for Power", Analog, March 1997
- "The Boys from Bethlehem" (with Denise Lee), The Darkness and the Fire, Jeffry Dwight ed., Wildside Press, August 1998
