= Kevin O'Donnell (Peace Corps) =

American Peace Corps director (1925–2012)

Kevin O’Donnell Sr
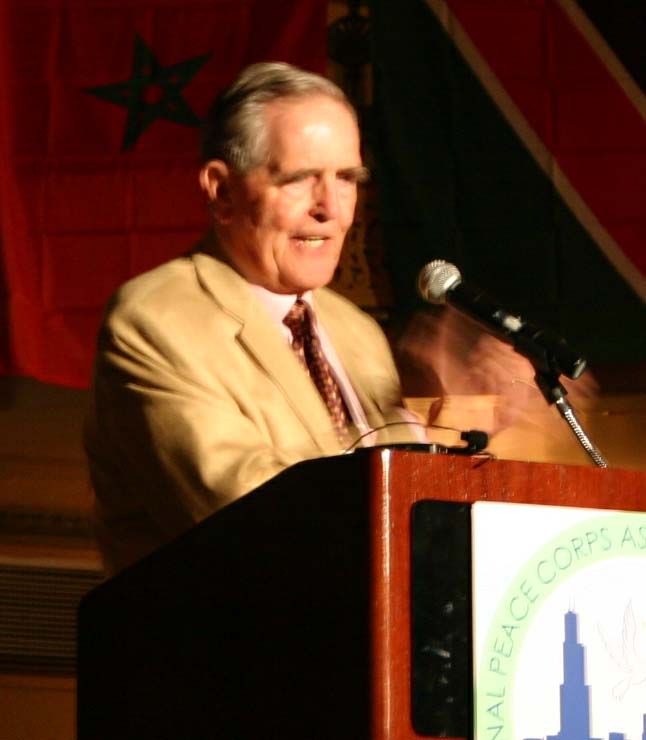
- O'Donnell addresses the National Peace Corps convention in Chicago in 2004

4th Director of the United States Peace Corps
- In office July 1, 1971 – September 30, 1972
- Appointed by: Richard Nixon
- Preceded by: Joseph Blatchford
- Succeeded by: Donald Hess

Personal details
- Born: June 9, 1925 Cleveland, Ohio, U.S.
- Died: February 29, 2012 (aged 86) Cleveland, Ohio, U.S.

Kevin O'Donnell (June 9, 1925 – February 29, 2012) was the fourth director of Peace Corps, serving from July 1, 1971 to September 30, 1972.

== Early life ==
O'Donnell was born and grew up in Cleveland and was educated at St. Rose's Grammar School and West High School. O'Donnell spent two semesters at Kenyon college before joining the US Navy Supply Corps during World War II. He returned after the war and graduated from Kenyon in 1947. O'Donnell earned an MBA at Harvard University then worked for SIFCO, Atlas Alloys, and Booz, Allen & Hamilton. O'Donnell was campaign manager for Republican Willard Brown's run for Cleveland mayor.

== Peace Corps Country Director for Korea ==
In January, 1966, O'Donnell saw a newspaper story about a local man serving as a Peace Corps administrator in Guatemala. "This was the first time I learned that people could actually get paid to be in the Peace Corps," O'Donnell says. "That it wasn't just volunteers. So I wrote this cold letter about my experience in business. I was so naïve." O'Donnell had lost his first wife, Margaret Ann(Peg) O ‘Donnell, March 20, 1965, following the birth of their sixth child and battled alcoholism and was looking for a chance to do something different. "I was at a point in my life when I wished to be more mission- than profit-oriented," O'Donnell says.

O'Donnell accepted an assignment from the Peace Corps to be Country Director for South Korea and to start the program. O'Donnell's assignment was to establish educational programs in English, math, science, and physical education. "You went in and you sank or swam," says O'Donnell. O'Donnell found that managing Peace Corps Volunteers was different from working in private industry. "By and large, people who applied to the Peace Corps had energy and ability, and my biggest job was to point them in the right direction and then get the hell out of the way," O'Donnell says.

By 1969 the US was at the height of the Vietnam War and there were 300 volunteers in South Korea "and they were pissed at our government for the war, and they really wanted to make a statement, so they decided it would be best to march on the U.S. embassy in South Korea. I sat down with them and said, 'Listen, what you should do is put together a delegation, and go to the various pockets of volunteers to have them sign petitions, then select a few of them to go to Congress and tell them what they're thinking over here.' I told them that I'd pick up the tab. I'd rather have them doing that than demonstrating on the streets of Seoul. That would have been a mess." O'Donnell's leadership of the Peace Corps in Korea was recognized by President Park Chung Hee, who awarded O'Donnell the Order of Civil Merit as O'Donnell completed four years as Country Director.

== Peace Corps Director ==
After four years as Country Director for South Korea, O'Donnell was offered a job in Peace Corps Headquarters in Washington DC as director of administration and finance. He was made acting deputy director, and then, in July 1971, Director of the Peace Corps.

On January 4, 1972 Joseph H. Blatchford, director of Action, the agency that oversaw the Peace Corps, ordered a halt in signing up volunteers and instructed O'Donnell to prepare plans to terminate about 4,000 volunteers on duty in 55 countries. Blatchford wanted the plans so that the volunteers can be returned to the United States by the end of March. Congress had refused to appropriate the $82 million requested by President Nixon for the Peace Corps. Instead, it cut funds to a level that one agency source described as "just one step above putting us out of business altogether". Conservative Louisiana Democrat Otto Passman wanted to kill the Peace Corps. "It was a pivotal time. Had Congressman Passman's efforts succeeded, the Peace Corps would have had to recall thousands of volunteers, breaking contracts and commitments with communities and countries around the world," said O'Donnell. During the hearings before Congress, O'Donnell showed how the Peace Corps' budget amounted to about one-quarter the price for a single jet fighter but Congress continued strip the Peace Corps' funding. In the end, the money to allow Peace Corps to continue its overseas programs came from an unlikely source - Richard Nixon. "Had the Nixon White House not intervened, transferring funds from other overseas programs to the Peace Corps, the Peace Corps could not have continued without serious repercussions. The effects would have been devastating. Thankfully, our case prevailed," O'Donnell says.

O'Donnell believed strongly in a non-career Peace Corps. Most staff positions in the Peace Corps follow a five-year rule but O'Donnell, as a presidential appointee, agreed to a one-year extension and left six years to the day after he signed up.

O'Donnell continues his interest and service in the Peace Corps. O'Donnell's daughter Megan served as a Peace Corps Volunteer in Nepal. His granddaughter Allison served as a Peace Corps Volunteer in Honduras. O'Donnell serves as a member of the Advisory Counsel to the National Peace Corps Association.

== Businessman ==
In 1972, O'Donnell returned to Cleveland as CEO of SIFCO, a metal working firm, where he'd worked before the Peace Corps. His Peace Corps experience overseas was good for business and helped SIFCO land contracts in South Korea, China and, "because I'm Irish", in Ireland. O'Donnell retired from SIFCO in 1990 and continued to serve on several boards and run a consultancy firm.

== Honors ==
On April 15, 2008, the Korea Society honored the Peace Corps volunteers who served in Korea with the 2008 James A. Van Fleet Award, an award given to prominent Korean and American individuals or organizations for outstanding contributions to U.S-Korea relationships. Kevin O'Donnell, as the first country director of Peace Corps Korea accepted the award on behalf of the volunteers.

== Personal life ==
O'Donnell's first wife died in childbirth. O'Donnell remarried in August 1965 to Ellen and their combined families have eight children and fifteen grandchildren. Before the O'Donnell's joined the Peace Corps administrative staff in Korea, they adopted each other's children. "I think there are a lot of positive factors that happened in our merger," said daughter Maura. "The moment we got on that plane [for Korea], nobody knew we were two different families." On January 21, 2008, the Cleveland Plain Dealer announced the passing of Ellen O'Donnell. "She helped to make you feel good about yourself and that no problem could not be solved by simply doing what you do and being yourself," added Maura.

O'Donnell was the father of science fiction writer Kevin O'Donnell, Jr, who died on November 7, 2012.

== Citations ==
Government offices
Preceded by Joseph Blatchford	Director of the Peace Corps; 1971–1972	Succeeded by Donald Hess
