= Moral Equivalent of War speech =

1977 speech by U.S. president Jimmy Carter

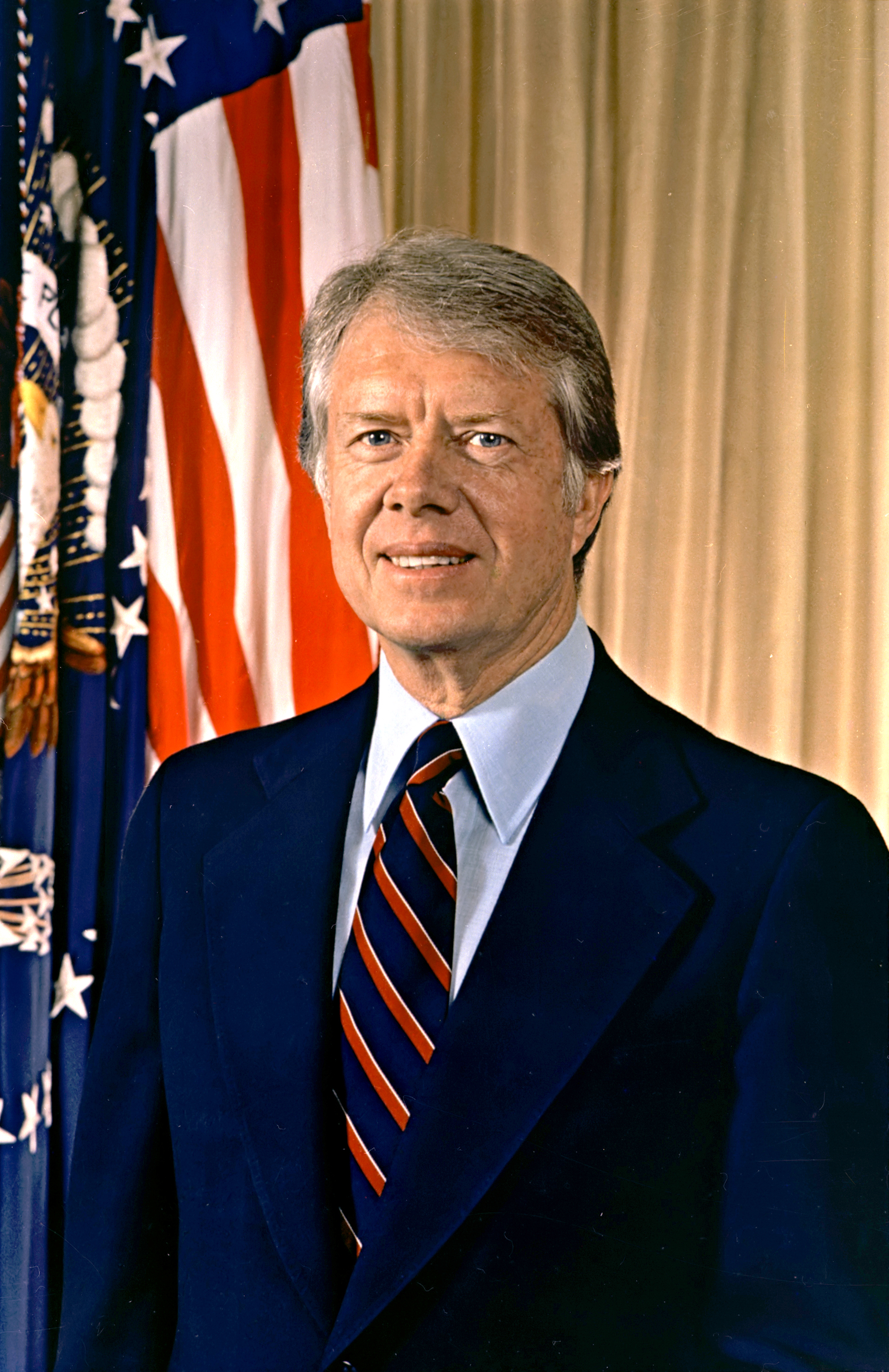
Jimmy Carter in 1978

The Moral Equivalent of War speech was a televised address made by President Jimmy Carter of the United States on April 18, 1977.

The speech is remembered for his comparison of the 1970s energy crisis with the "moral equivalent of war." Carter gave ten principles for the plan but did not list specific actions. He said that the goal was to reduce dependence on oil imports and "cut in half the portion of United States oil which is imported, from a potential level of 16 million barrels to six million barrels a day."

The phrase has become so well known that it is referenced in literature. Carter used the phrase from the classic essay "The Moral Equivalent of War," which was derived from the speech given by the American psychologist and philosopher William James, delivered at Stanford University in 1906, and the subsequent book, published in 1910, in which "James considered one of the classic problems of politics: how to sustain political unity and civic virtue in the absence of war or a credible threat" and "sounds a rallying cry for service in the interests of the individual and the nation." Those ideas were mirrored in much of Carter's philosophy.

The speech inspired neither congressional action nor significant public mobilization, and the news media jokingly called Carter's "Moral Equivalent of War" speech and his energy recommendations by its acronym, MEOW.

== Speech ==
Carter noted that the energy crisis was likely to progressively worsen and could result in a national catastrophe. He cited the effort was the "moral equivalent of war".

He cited historical energy changes from wood to coal then oil. He foresaw the renewed use of coal and solar power. Our consumption of oil would keep going up every year. Our cars would continue to be too large and inefficient. Three-quarters of them would continue to carry only one person—the driver—while our public transportation system continues to decline. He predicted that by 1985, energy use would increase by 33 percent.

He predicted that $550 billion would be spent on imported oil by 1985, up from $37 billion at the time of the speech and $3.7 billion six year earlier.

=== Principles ===
Ten principles were introduced:

- the country can have an effective and comprehensive energy policy only if the government takes responsibility for it and if the people understand the seriousness of the challenge and are willing to make sacrifices.
- healthy economic growth must continue. Only by saving energy can we maintain our standard of living and keep our people at work. An effective conservation program will create hundreds of thousands of new jobs.
- must protect the environment. Our energy problems have the same cause as our environmental problems—wasteful use of resources. Conservation helps us solve both at once.
- must reduce our vulnerability to potentially devastating embargoes. We can protect ourselves from uncertain supplies by reducing our demand for oil, making the most of our abundant resources such as coal, and developing a strategic petroleum reserve.
- must ask equal sacrifices from every region, every class of people, every interest group. Industry will have to do its part to conserve, just as the consumers will. The energy producers deserve fair treatment, but we will not let the oil companies profiteer.
- the cornerstone of our policy, is to reduce the demand through conservation. Our emphasis on conservation is a clear difference between this plan and others which merely encouraged crash production efforts. Conservation is the quickest, cheapest, most practical source of energy. Conservation is the only way we can buy a barrel of oil for a few dollars. It costs about $13 to waste it.
- prices should generally reflect the true replacement costs of energy. We are only cheating ourselves if we make energy artificially cheap and use more than we can really afford.
- government policies must be predictable and certain. Both consumers and producers need policies they can count on so they can plan ahead. This is one reason I am working with the Congress to create a new Department of Energy, to replace more than 50 different agencies that now have some control over energy.
- must conserve the fuels that are scarcest and make the most of those that are more plentiful. We can't continue to use oil and gas for 75 percent of our consumption when they make up seven percent of our domestic reserves. We need to shift to plentiful coal while taking care to protect the environment, and to apply stricter safety standards to nuclear energy.
- must start now to develop the new, unconventional sources of energy we will rely on in the next century.

=== Goals ===
Goals we set for 1985:

- Reduce the annual growth rate in our energy demand to less than two percent.
- Reduce gasoline consumption by ten percent below its current level.
- Cut in half the portion of United States oil which is imported, from a potential level of 16 million barrels (2,500,000 m^{3}) to 6 million barrels per day (950,000 m^{3}/d).
- Establish a strategic petroleum reserve of one billion barrels, more than six months' supply.
- Increase our coal production by about two thirds to more than 1 billion tons a year.
- Insulate 90 percent of American homes and all new buildings.
- Use solar energy in more than two and one-half million houses.

Additionally, Carter stated that those who insist on driving large, unnecessarily powerful cars must expect to pay more for that luxury.

== See also ==
- 1979 energy crisis

== Related speeches ==
A Crisis of Confidence ('Malaise') Speech

- Carter, Jimmy (15 July 1979). "A Crisis of Confidence Speech". American Rhetoric.
