= Michael Schlein =

- Born: 10 March 1961 (age 65); New York, New York, United States
- Education: Massachusetts Institute of Technology
- Occupations: President and CEO, Accion (since 2009)

Michael Schlein is the president and CEO of Accion, a global microfinance and impact investment nonprofit.

== Biography ==
Schlein holds a bachelor's degree in economics and a master's degree in political science from the Massachusetts Institute of Technology. He graduated Phi Beta Kappa in 1984. He also studied at the London School of Economics in 1983. He is married to Lisa Jordan Tamagni and resides with his family in Brooklyn, New York.

== Career ==
Schlein began his career at Smith Barney, where he worked with municipal governments on access to capital markets. He then was Chief of Staff to the New York City Deputy Mayor for Finance and Economic Development (1989-1993), and then Chief of Staff under Chairman Arthur Levitt at the U.S. Securities and Exchange Commission (1994-1997).

He returned to the private sector in 1997, working directly for then-Smith Barney CEO Jamie Dimon. Following the firm's merger with Salomon Brothers, Travelers, and Citibank into the newly created Citigroup, he assumed responsibilities for government relations, philanthropy, internal and external strategic communications and branding, human resources and international franchise management. He was a member of the firm's Management Committee, Executive Director of its Business Practices Committee, as a director of Citibank, N.A.; Poland's Bank Handlowy, and Citibank Korea, Inc.

Through his work with Citi's philanthropic arm, the Citi Foundation, he became interested in microfinance and worked with Accion, a global non-profit that helps provide financial services for those living in poverty. He joined Accion's board of directors in 2007. He was appointed president and CEO of Accion following Maria Otero’s departure in September 2009.

At Accion, he has overseen significant expansions of the organization, including a new strategy focused on the broader goal of financial inclusion where everyone has access to the financial tools they need to help improve their lives. Schlein is a vocal advocate of building economic opportunity through microfinance, impact investing, and social entrepreneurship, and he is frequently quoted in the media, including Reuters, American Banker, and Institutional Investor on related subjects.

== Related professional work ==
In April of 2014, New York City Mayor Bill de Blasio appointed Schlein to serve as the chairman of the New York City Economic Development Corporation. Schlein and de Blasio are long-time personal friends, having worked together in the Dinkins Administration. He has stated that he plans to “be more prudent” in the city's approach to corporate subsidies and tax incentives, noting that “New York City is a magnet for talent and employees” and NYC is “now in a position of strength.” He also serves on the board of directors for BancoSol in Bolivia, and is a member of the Council on Foreign Relations.
