= List of Independence Award recipients (1980–1989) =

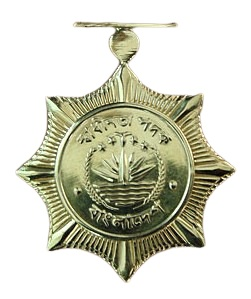
List of Independence Day Award recipients
- 1977–1979
- 1980–1989
- 1990–1999
- 2000–2009
- 2010–2019
- 2020–2029

Independence Award, Bangladesh's highest civilian honours - Winners, 1980-1989:

== 1980 ==
Recipients	Area	Note
Muhammad Shahidullah	education	posthumous
Mawlana Abu Zafar Mohammad Saleh	education	
Alhaz Zahir Uddin	social work	posthumous
Farrukh Ahmed	literature	posthumous
Munier Chowdhury	science and technology	posthumous
Sohrab Hossain	music	
Khondokar Ameer Hasan	science and technology	

== 1981 ==
Recipients	Area	Note
Maulana Mohammad Akram Khan	journalism	posthumous
Abbas Uddin	music	posthumous
Major Abdul Ghani	social work	posthumous
Shamsunnahar Mahmud	social work	posthumous
Abbas Mirja	sports	posthumous
Dewan Mohammad Azraf	literature	
Waliullah Patwari	education	
Ustad Khadem Hossain Khan	music	

== 1982 ==
Recipients	Area	Note
M. A. Rashid	education	posthumous
Kazi Mohammad Mosharraf Hossain	social work	posthumous
Syed Murtaza Ali	literature	posthumous
Anwarul Haque	fine arts	posthumous
Begum Feroza Bari	social service	

== 1983 ==
In the year 1983, 4 individuals and 1 organization were awarded:

Recipients	Area	Note
Abdul Kadir	literature	
Muhammad Enamul Haque	education	posthumous
Serajul Huq	education	
Bangladesh Institute of Research and Rehabilitation for Diabetes, Endocrine and Metabolic Disorders (BIRDEM)	medical science	organization

== 1984 ==
In the year 1984, 6 individuals and 2 institutes were awarded. One person was awarded.

Recipients	Area	Note
Muhammad Qudrat-i-Khuda	Science	
Mohammad Nasiruddin	journalism	
Muhammad Mansuruddin	literature	
Shah Abul Hasnat Mohammad Ismail	literature	
Ustad Ayet Ali Khan	music	
Bulbul Choudhury	dance	posthumous
Didar Sarbik Gram Unnayan Samabay Somity	rural development	
Kumudini Welfare Trust	social service	organization

== 1985 ==
One person was awarded.

Recipients	Area	Note
Muhammad Ataul Gani Osmani	social welfare	posthumous

== 1986 ==
Two individuals and one organization were awarded.

Recipients	Area	Note
Bangladesh Academy for Rural Development, Comilla	rural development	organization
Mafizuddin Ahmed	science and technology	
Mosharraf Hossain	sports	

== 1987 ==
Three individuals and one organization were awarded.

Recipients	Area	Note
M Hossain Ali	social work	
Syed Ali Ahsan	literature	
Muhammad Yunus	rural development	
Armed Forces Institute of Pathology and Transfusion	medical science	organization

== 1988 ==
Two individuals were awarded.

Recipients	Area	Note
Aminul Islam	fine arts	
Md. Nurul Alam	social work	posthumous

== 1989 ==
Two individuals were awarded.

Recipients	Area	Note
Mostafizur Rahman	medical science and social work	
Niaz Morshed	sports	
