= Khadi industry of Comilla =

Fabrics made by the khadi industry of Comilla, Bangladesh are very popular among people of all classes, both domestically and internationally. The popularity of this cloth increased during the anti-British movement called by Mahatma Gandhi in 1921. The Khadi industry originated in those days based on the slogan "Embrace indigenous products and boycott foreign products."

== Naming ==
There are differing opinions regarding the naming of Khadi fabric. When the demand for Khadi cloth increased in the country, to meet the demand of the common people, this cloth was made by digging a pit in the ground and using a foot pedal. Since it was made from "khad" (a pit), the fabric came to be known as "Khaddar" or "Khadi." However, some believe that the word "Khaddar" originates from the Gujarati language, from which the terms "Khadi" or "Khaddar" were derived.

== History ==
Since ancient times, there has been a huge demand for Khadi or Khaddar cloth made in Comilla in this subcontinent. To preserve this demand, following the Bengali language movement of 1952, Dr. Akhtar Hameed Khan, the then principal of Comilla Victoria Government College and founder of Bangladesh Academy for Rural Development (BARD), then known as PARD, along with the assistance of then Governor Feroz Khan Noon, established the Khadi and Cottage Industries Association. At that time, Khadi or Khaddar cloth was woven in the Abhyasram of Comilla, the Prabartak Sangha of Chittagong, and the Gandhi Ashram of Noakhali. At that time, The Khadi Cooperative Association Limited, established by Dr. Akhtar Hameed Khan in Chandina, was taken over by Shailen Guha of Chandina and his son Bijan Guha. They worked tirelessly to spread the reputation of the Khadi industry. After the death of Shailen Guha, his son Bijon Guha has managed to sustain this industry with great effort. In Chandina, there still exists a weaving industry intertwined with the memories of Mahatma Gandhi.In 1994, the Khadi industry of Comilla received international recognition for its quality.।

== Present situation ==
Comilla's Chandina, Muradnagar, and Debidwar upazilas are home to thousands of weaving industries. The weavers in these areas are trying their best to maintain the reputation of this renowned craft. However, it is becoming increasingly difficult to compete with fabrics produced using modern information technology. Additionally, the abnormal rise in the cost of raw materials for fabric production poses another significant challenge for the industry.

== Patronage ==
Government support is needed to survive the renowned Khadi industry of Comilla. It is necessary to provide low-interest loans to weavers and control the prices of raw materials for making Khadi fabrics.
