= Mohammad Yeasin =

Development worker in Bangladesh

Mohammad Yeasin (? – 1999) is a development worker, founder of Deedar Comprehensive Village Cooperative Society, and recipient of Independence Award, the highest civilian award in Bangladesh.

== Biography ==
Yeasin established Deedar Comprehensive Village Cooperative Society in 1960 in Comilla District. Yeasin was a law enforcement officer who lost his job and imprisoned for protesting in the 1950s. He started a tea stall and purchased a few rickshaws. Following the advice of Akhtar Hameed Khan, founder of Bangladesh Academy for Rural Development, he formed a cooperative society to work for the benefit of low income villagers.

Deedar Comprehensive Village Cooperative Society won the Independence Award in 1984. It won the Ramon Magsaysay Award in 1988. It has won the National Agriculture Awards and the National Cooperative Award.

Yeasin was awarded the Independence Award in 1990 for rural development.

Yeasin died on 17 October 1999.
