= Perween Rahman =

Pakistani social activist (1957–2013)

- 2011 interview screenshot
- Born: 22 January 1957; Dacca, East Pakistan
- Died: 13 March 2013 (aged 56); Karachi, Pakistan
- Cause of death: Murder
- Organization: Orangi Pilot Project
- Known for: Director of the Orangi Pilot Project, Karachi

Perween Rahman (22 January 1957 – 13 March 2013) was a Pakistani social activist, director of the Orangi Pilot Project Research and Training Institute. She was murdered on 13 March 2013.

== Biography ==
Perween Rahman was born on 22 January 1957, in Dhaka, then situated in East Pakistan (now Bangladesh). She belonged to a Bihari family which moved to Karachi following the Bangladesh Liberation War in 1971. She obtained a Bachelor of Architecture degree in 1982 from the Dawood College of Engineering and Technology, and a postgraduate diploma in housing, building and urban planning in 1986 from the Institute of Housing Studies in Rotterdam, Netherlands. She worked at a private architecture firm before being recruited by Akhter Hameed Khan to become joint director of the Orangi Pilot Project in 1983, where she managed the housing and sanitation programs. In 1988, OPP was split into four organizations, and Perween Rahman became director of Orangi Pilot Project – Research and Training Institute (OPP-RTI), managing programs in education, youth training, water supply, and secure housing.

In 1989, she founded the NGO Urban Resource Centre in Karachi and was also part of the board of Saiban, another NGO dedicated to low-income housing, and Orangi Charitable Trust (OPP-OCT), the microfinance branch of OPP.

She taught at the University of Karachi, NED University, Indus Valley School of Art and Architecture and Dawood College of Engineering and Technology, all located in Karachi.

She was the sister of author and teacher Ahtsham Ali Memon, and the current head of the OPP, Aquila Ismail.

== Murder and investigation ==
On 13 March 2013, Perween Rahman was killed when four gunmen opened fire on her vehicle near Pirabad Police Station, ending her 28-year-long career for land and basic services rights for Pakistan's poor. Rahman had been an outspoken critic of the land mafias in Karachi and their political patrons.

Rahman had complained in the past that she had received death threats. At one point, some armed men stormed her offices and ordered her staff to leave.

The prime suspect in the murder of Rahman was arrested during a joint operation conducted by Karachi and Mansehra police in Mansehra, Pakistan. The suspect Ahmed Khan alias Pappu Kashmiri was arrested in Mansehra.

The very next day, police killed a Taliban operative named Qari Bilal in an encounter and claimed he was the murderer, resulting in a closure of the case.

On 15 April 2014, the Supreme Court of Pakistan ordered authorities to conduct a fresh probe into Rahman's murder after a judicial inquiry revealed that police officers had manipulated the investigation.

In December 2021, four men were sentenced to life in prison for Rahman's murder. Three of the men convicted received a sentence of fifty-seven years and six months. While Raheem Swati and his son Imran were sentenced to fifty years and seven-and-a-half years respectively.

== In popular culture ==
Rahman's work and assassination were portrayed in Into Dust (2021).

== Honours and awards ==
- Honorary lifetime membership of the International Water Academy based in Oslo, Norway.
- 1986 Jaycees Award for community work
- 1994 National Building Research Institute award for Housing
- 1996 UN-Habitat Best Practice (with OPP-RTI)
- 1997 Faiz Foundation Award for community research
- 2001 Rotary Club Award for vocational services.
- 2001 World Habitat Awards winner (with OPP-RTI).
- 2013 Sitara–i–Shujaat (Order of Bravery, Posthumous) conferred by the President of Pakistan on 23 March 2013
- 2022 Google celebrated the 65th birthday of Rehman with a doodle.

== Publications ==
- Rahman, P., & Rashid, A. (1992). Working With Community: Some Principles and Methods.
- Perween Rahman (2004). Katchi Abadis of Karachi: A survey of 334 Katchi Abadis.
- Perween Rahman, 2009, Water Supply in Karachi, OPP-RTI.
- Pervaiz, Perween Rahman & Arif Hasan (2008). Lessons from Karachi: The role of demonstration, documentation, mapping and relationship building in advocacy for improved urban sanitation and water services (Vol. 6). Earthprint.
