= Local Government Engineering Department =

Organization in Bangladesh

Local Government Engineering Department (LGED) is an organ of the Government of Bangladesh created for provision of infrastructure in rural areas and to provide technical support to the rural and the urban local government institutions (LGIs), planning and implementation of infrastructure development projects in the rural and urban areas to improve communication and transport network, job creation, and poverty reduction.

== History ==
LGED took root in the early 1960s, when implementation of Works Programme (WP) started to develop physical infrastructure for poor people. In the 1970s, it grew into a cell of the Local Government Division (LGD) under the Ministry of Local Government, Rural Development and Co-operatives. In 1982, it became an independent body named the Works Programme Wing per recommendations of the Enam Committee (Note: Early in Chief Martial Law Administrator Ershad's regime, the Martial Law Committee was formed to examine the organizational structure of Bangladeshi ministries, divisions, and directorates. The committee was headed by Brigadier General Enam and became known popularly as the Enam Committee.) to administer Works Programme nationwide, and was renamed as the Local Government Engineering Bureau (LGEB) per a decision of the National Implementation Committee for Administrative Reforms (NICAR) in October 1984. It was upgraded as LGED in August 1992.

LGED implements three of the four components of the Comilla Model, a development program designed at the Comilla Academy for Rural Development (renamed as Bangladesh Academy for Rural Development) in 1961. These are the Works Programme, the Upazila Irrigation Programme and construction of Upazila Training and Development Centre.

Headed by a Chief Engineer it employs, as of 2007, a total of 10,246 Engineers and other staff. It has district offices headed by an Executive Engineer and sub-district offices headed by an Upazila Engineer. Upazila Engineers play key role for transport, social and institutional infrastructure development. LGED implementats more than 60 development projects a year in rural development, agriculture, water and transportation.
