= Orangi Pilot Project =

Development project in slums of Karachi, Pakistan

The Orangi Pilot Project (Urdu: اورنگی پائلٹ پراجیکٹ; abbreviated OPP) collectively designates three Pakistani non-governmental organisations working together, having emerged from a socially innovative project carried out in 1980s in the squatter areas of Orangi, Karachi, Pakistan. It was initiated by the social scientist Akhter Hameed Khan and implemented by Arif Hassan, Perween Rahman, Shameem Zainuddin, and Tasneem Siddiqi among many others. Innovative methods were used to provide adequate low cost sanitation, health, housing and microfinance facilities.

Currently OPP designates three organisations, born out of the original OPP in 1989 OPP-RTI (Research and Training Institute), OPP-OCT (Orangi Charitable Trust, involved in microfinance) and OPP-KHASDA (Karachi Health and Social Development Association, involved in health activities). A fourth organisation, OPP-RDT (Rural Development Trust) was merged with OPP-RTI in 2012.

The project also comprised a number of programmes, including a people's financed and managed low-cost sanitation programme; a housing programme; a basic health and family planning programme; a programme of supervised credit for small family enterprise units; an education programme; and a rural development programme in the nearby villages.

Today, the project encompasses much more than the neighbourhood level problems. The research and development programmes under the institutions developed by the project now cover wider issues related to the areas all over Karachi.

Its director until 2013 was Perween Rahman, who was murdered on 13 March 2013. The current Director is Aquila Ismail.

== Organization's success ==
Orangi was a squatter community, and did not qualify for government aid due to their "unofficial" status. With endogenous research, the community was able to make an affordable sanitation system for the treatment of sewage, which helped to reduce the spread of disease. The system was created and paid for by the local community, who would not have had access to a sewer system otherwise.

The programme proved so successful that it was adopted by communities across developing countries. After the success of the initial phase, the programme was expanded into four autonomous groups.

1. The Orangi Pilot Project Society, to control funding for the other three groups.
2. The Orangi Research and Training Institute, to manage the programme and provide training for onward dissemination.
3. The Orangi Charitable Trust, to manage microcredit programmes.
4. The Karachi Health and Social Development Association, to manage a health programme.

== Foundation of Orangi Pilot Project (OPP) ==
Akhtar Hameed Khan (1914–1999) was the founder and first director of the project, and managed to bring modern sanitation to the squatter community of 1 million people. He had previously organised farmers' cooperatives and rural training centres and had served as an adviser to various development projects in Pakistan. He was also a research fellow and visiting professor at Michigan State University (US), Director of the Pakistan Academy of Rural Development and Principal of Victoria College (Bangladesh).

Comparing the OPP with his earlier Comilla project, Akhtar Hameed Khan commented:

"The Orangi Pilot Project was very different from the Comilla Academy. OPP was a private body, dependent for its small fixed budget on another NGO. The vast resources and support of the government, Harvard advisers, MSU, and Ford Foundation was missing. OPP possessed no authority, no sanctions. It may observe and investigate but it could only advise, not enforce.".

However, both projects followed the same research and extension methods.

== Publications ==
- Perween Rahman, 2004, Katchi Abadis of Karachi: A survey of 334 katchi abadis – Existing situation, problems and solutions related to sewage disposal, water supply, health and education. Orangi Pilot Project-Research and Training Institute. Sama Publishing. ISBN 969-8784-09-8
- Arif Hasan, 2000, Scaling Up of the Orangi Pilot Project Programs: successes, failures and potentials, City Press, Karachi.
- Arif Hasan, 1999, Akhtar Hameed Khan and the Orangi Pilot Project, City Press, Karachi.
- Akhtar Hameed Khan, 1996, Orangi Pilot Project: Reminiscences and Reflection, Oxford University Press, Karachi
- Arif Hasan, 1993, Scaling Up of the OPP's Low Cost Sanitation Program, Research Training Institute, Karachi.

== See also ==
- Microfinance
- Social innovation
