= Deafness in Kosovo =

A map of Kosovo

== Sign languages and their status ==
As of 2010, there are an estimated 7,000-8,000 deaf people in Kosovo. There is no official data, so some estimate that the number of Deaf individuals is anywhere from 3,600- 7/8,000. In some documents, the primary sign language spoken in Kosovo is Yugoslav Sign Language (YSL). It's language status is a 5- meaning that it is developing. However, Kosovo legally made Kosovar Sign Language (KosSL) the official Sign Language of Kosovo in 2010 and 2014. Kosovar Sign Language is a dialect of YSL and is preferred over speaking and gesticulating by 99% of the Deaf Community in Kosovo.

== Human/ civil rights ==
=== Equity and non-discrimination ===
Kosovo’s constitution generally states that before the law, nobody shall be discriminated against- regardless of background. Kosovo has also passed the “comprehensive disability law” which is an overview of all laws/ regulations relating to discrimination and equity among disabled people- however, it has a large focus on assessing and determining disabilities as well as the government benefits and services for disabled individuals. There are general anti-discrimination laws for disabled individuals, but the constitution lacks specific laws regarding Deaf and Hard of Hearing individuals. Despite continued efforts to push for clearer, more detailed anti-discrimination laws, there are three main factors stopping them- a lack of cohesiveness in laws, limited finances, and lack of space and resources.

=== Accessibility ===
For those who need information and communication services, the resources are limited- with there only being 30 trained KosSL interpreters- 16 of which are certified. For individuals who are blind, there are some laws printed in Braille, although the government is working to print more in Braille. Not only this, but most websites from the Government are not disability accessible. As far as accessible transportation goes- in central Prishtina, there is a policy where blindness and paraplegic people are exempted from payment in urban public transport and are entitled to a 50% reduction of fees in interurban transport (although the latter is mostly unimplemented). Finally, accessible spaces are rare- with there being limited resources to make buildings accessible.

=== Inclusive services ===
==== Assessments ====
Assessments are conducted by “Ministry of Finance, Labour and Transfer” (“MFLT”) to determine eligibility for services, while the “Ministry of Education, Science, Technology and Innovation” (“MESTI”) gives pedagogical assessments. For both the “MFLT” and the “MESTI”, they require medical records/ evidence, however, for many disabled individuals, it is difficult to navigate these systems to set up assessments to get these documents.

==== Disability support services ====
Kosovo offers a few support services- health services, residential care for persons with mental health disabilities, community-based rehabilitation, psycho-social support, physiotherapy, speech therapy, early intervention, independent living, and educational and vocational training. However, these services can be difficult to obtain for people living in rural areas, the size of these programs are relatively small, and there is not much funding for them. The services offered are limited to patients recently diagnosed and in-patients.

==== Social services ====
Services are mostly reduced to social assistance, which is primarily financial. This assistance could be used to pay for services, but the amount received is too low to realistically do that.

=== Accountability and governing ===
Most data is documented as what was done rather than input and output- making it hard to see the cause and effect of things, and in turn causing a struggle for governing and holding people accountable.

=== Budgeting and data-gathering ===
There is limited data on budgeting and spending for disability inclusion.

== Newborn hearing screenings ==
There is insufficient evidence of UNHS in Kosovo

== Early intervention ==
Generally, the National Strategy on the Rights of Persons with Disabilities in Kosovo, 2013 – 2023 as well as many other laws outline the basic social rights of children with disabilities, but access to things like Early Childhood Intervention (ECI) services, physical environments, transportation and information for children remains low.

More specifically, there are almost no ECI programs. Although there is the "Home Visiting Programme" for early identification, Early Intervention is limited.

According to the United Nations Children's Fund, although Kosovo has a general outline for Early Childhood Development, they are lacking a "multisectoral... strategy and cross-sectoral coordination and collaboration".

== Higher education ==
=== Legal protections ===
Under the Criminal Code of Kosovo, is illegal to be discriminatory against an individual with any disability, and under their law, those with and without disabilities have equal rights. In higher education, that means providing a safe, inclusive environment with the necessary materials for learning in higher education. Making any infractions can result in fines or imprisonment. Despite having laws/ proposed laws on discrimination, they are loosely implemented.

=== Accommodations/ support ===
Kosovo does not have Sign Language Interpreters in their higher education system. Despite this, their official "Strategy For The Rights Of Persons With Disabilities 2025-2030" states that they want to "(implement the) Regulation QRK 15/2014 on the Provision of Sign Language Services in Public Institutions for Deaf Persons". They use the UN's Convention on the Rights of Persons with Disabilities as a reference for a few of their proposed laws. By 2030, they plan to have a law that gives Deaf individuals the right to communication and information at any point. Not only that, but they also plan on training people on how to sign and teach deaf students in schools. This is because there are currently only 30 trained KosSL interpreters- 16 of which are certified.

=== Admissions practices ===
According to the Criminal Code of Kosovo, it is illegal to discriminate against any student with a disability by refusing them admission into a college or university. Despite this, applying to university is the main challenge for many Deaf students- as they are not offered interpreters.

=== Fields of study ===
Many individuals- 96.7%- feel as though they do not have a good enough foundation in reading and writing to pursue further education in it. This is largely because of the literacy crisis for Deaf individuals in Kosovo- with 58.8% of Deaf individuals having poor reading and writing abilities.

=== Outcomes ===
There is no official data on degree holders in Kosovo.

=== Vocational/ technical/ trade schools ===
In Kosovo, Vocational training begins in secondary school (from ages 15-18). For Deaf and Hard of Hearing students (because of the acts stopping discrimination in education) the timeline remains almost the exact same. The only significant difference is that there are three schools for disabled students to choose from- Lef Nosi, Xheladin Deda, and Nene Tereza and that each school takes the individual student's needs into account. Lef Nosi trains students for the textile industry, Xheladin Deda gives them physiotherapeutic education, and Nene Tereza educates them on auto mechanics, graphic design, computers, and textiles.

== Employment ==
=== Common forms of employment ===
The most common type of work- due to the high illiteracy rates, struggles to attend university, and difficulties in oral interviews- are jobs with manual labor.

=== Employment data ===
Out of all of the Deaf and Hard of Hearing people in Kosovo, only 9 have jobs in public institutions. This is incredibly low when compared to the 82,223 people working as public servants (or about 4.6% of the population). Not only that, but in Kosovo, 19.4% of Deaf adults with a high school diploma, 20% of Deaf adults who attended but did not finish high school, and 12.1% of Deaf individuals who did not attend high school are employed. This is approximately 20% of Deaf adults. For hearing adults, the percent of employed individuals is nearly double- 44.6%.

=== Hiring/ firing practices ===
One study found that 75% of businesses did not “support working conditions for disabled people”. The same study found that the main reason for not hiring disabled people was that they did not receive applications from disabled individuals (62%).

=== Compensation ===
According to one study, 29% of working disabled people reported low wages.

=== Legal protections ===
The right to work is guaranteed legally for all individuals, but there are many difficulties in procuring a job due to a few reasons: most people do not understand that pensions may be cancellable to earnings, many career services and vocational school are not inclusive for those with disabilities are therefore difficult to use, the "2% quota rule" (at least 2% of staff members must be someone with a disability) is not properly enforced, and employers who are okay with hiring disabled individuals are not made aware of the "2% quota rule". Kosovo legally must also provide career services to disabled people, but this is not utilized much- with less than 1% of disabled individuals using the services.
