= Rumana Husain =

Pakistani artist and writer

- Education: Graphic design
- Alma mater: Central Institute of Art and Craft
- Occupations: Artist; Author; Educator
- Notable work: Karachiwala - A subcontinent within a city

Rumana Husain is an artist, educator and a children's writer from Karachi, Pakistan. She is the author of over 90 children's books and the coffee-table book, Karachiwala - A subcontinent within a city.

== Education ==
Husain completed her high school in 1966 from Model Secondary Girls School and her Intermediate from Karachi College for Women. She completed a four year diploma in [Graphic design]from Central Institute of Art and Craft in 1972.

== Career ==
Husain started her career as an artist when her first child, Adil Husain, was born. Husain made stuffed toys for her children and soon she had an exhibition for her toys. She went on to create murals and exhibitions of her artwork. Her work was on display of the Children’s Ward at AKUH for twenty-five years, and even IUCN’s headquarters in Switzerland and its Karachi office has her murals installed.

Husain then turned towards teaching and taught art to school children. She trained school teachers across Pakistan in innovative approaches for language-teaching. She was associated with the CAS School as its Vice Principal and left it in 1996. She then worked at the school for 10 years at the beginning of its Junior Section and set up the school's Kindergarten Section in 1990. She has also remained its Headmistress.

In 1988, Husain co-founded the publishing agency, Book Group where she worked as a volunteer for 8 years writing children’s Urdu books and editing them. During her time at the Book Group, she also trained teachers across Karachi and some areas of Pakistan. She worked teacher manuals and on creating an integrated curriculum for 6 years. Husain also worked as a director at the Book Group for 4 years from 1997 to 2001.

In 2001, Husain joined the Children’s Museum for Peace and Human Rights where she was the head Activism and Outreach for 6 years.

Husain also became the Co-founding Senior Editor and partner of NuktaArt in 2005. NuktaArt was a bi-annual art magazine, published for ten years, of which she was Senior Editor.

She is also an Honorary member of the board of directors at the Children’s literature festival. She is also the General Secretary of Karachi conference foundation; an organization that aims to provide a platform for generating discourse, presenting research, and holding public events on Karachi-related issues by partnering with relevant scholars, activists and institutions.

In 2014, she became the founding member of I am Karachi consortium; a platform for organizations and individuals committed to promoting and supporting social and cultural activities as vehicles for peace building by reclaiming public spaces, bringing civil society together, and enhancing public awareness through dialogues and campaigns.

Husain is the author and illustrator of over 60 children's books. She has written books for several publishers including Oxford University Press, Danesh Publications, ERDC, Kathalya Publications (Nepal), Nami Children’s Books (South Korea), Butterfly Works (The Netherlands), Pratham Books (India) and the Book Group. She published the books ‘Karachi Wala – a subcontinent within a city’ and ‘Street smart – professionals on the street’, two coffee-table books on Karachi.

Husain also contributes to magazines and newspapers like Dawn, Tribune and more. Rumana has also presented over thirty programmes on art and architecture for TV One.

== Selected works ==
- Etienne and the angry dot
- City Tales: Growing Up
- Pakistan Ki Sair
- Jingles in the Jungle
- Mohtarma Fatima Jinnah
- The bird's pearl
- Karachi Walla-A subcontinent within a city
- Street smart - Professions on the street
- Dr Akhtar Hameed Khan, OUP Karachi
- Karachiwala: A subcontinent within a city

== Awards ==
She is the winner of the 4th UBL-Jang Literary Excellence Award (2014) in the Children’s Books category for her graphic story Dr Akhtar Hameed Khan, published by Oxford University Press, Karachi.
