= Gandhi Ashram =

Gandhi Ashram refers to Sabarmati Ashram, in Ahmedabad, India, one of the residences of Mahatma Gandhi. It can also refer to:

- Gandhi Ashram and Freedom Struggle Museum in Melandaha Upazila of Jamalpur District, Bangladesh
- Gandhi Ashram Trust, operating in Begumganj Upazila of Noakhali District, Bangladesh

== See also ==
- Gandhi Ashram School, in Kalimpong, India
