= Abbas Mirza (footballer) =

Bangladeshi sport administrator (1917–1980)

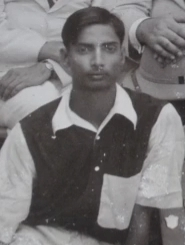
- Mirza in 1935

Personal information
- Date of birth: 1917
- Place of birth: Murshidabad, British India
- Date of death: 16 September 1980 (aged 62)
- Place of death: Dhaka, Bangladesh
- Height: 6 ft 0 in (1.83 m)
- Position: Center-forward

Senior career*
Years	Team	Apps	(Gls)
1934–1939	Kolkata Mohammedan		
- Calcutta Customs
1954	Ispahani Club		

International career
1936–1938	India XI		

Managerial career
- 1956: Dhaka Mohammedan
- * Club domestic league appearances and goals

Abbas Mirza (Bengali: আব্বাস মির্জা; 1917 – 16 September 1980) was a Bangladeshi footballer and sports organiser. He captained Kolkata Mohammedan from 1935 to 1939. He also represented the India XI in international exhibition matches between 1936 and 1938. In recognition of his outstanding contributions to sports, he was awarded the Pride of Performance Award of Pakistan in 1963, and the Independence Day Award of Bangladesh in 1981.

== Early life ==
Mirza was born in Murshidabad, British India, in 1917. He was a graduate of Presidency College, Calcutta. He also represented the college football and hockey teams, and received the prestigious Blue certificate.

== Club career ==
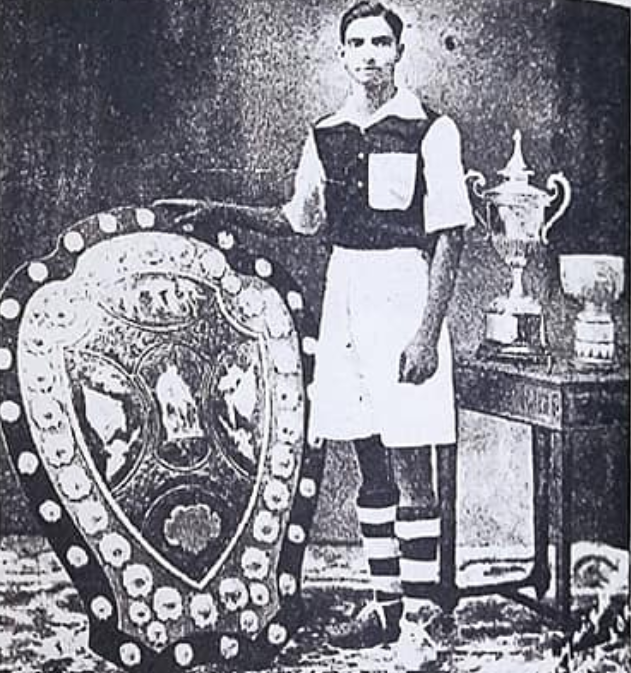
Kolkata Mohammedan captain, Mirza, posing with the IFA Shield and Calcutta League titles, 1936.

Mirza joined Kolkata Mohammedan in 1934 and was given the club's captaincy the following year. He captained Mohammedan to a record four back-to-back Calcutta Football League titles from 1935 to 1938. Most notably, he was influential during the league and IFA Shield "double" in 1936. He later joined Calcutta Customs Club after taking up employment with the parent organization. In 1954, he represented Ispahani Club in the Dhaka First Division Football League alongside former Mohammedan teammates Hafiz Rashid and Mohammad Yasin.

== International career ==
On 4 July 1936, Mirza played for India XI against the China Olympic team in an international exhibition match. The game held at Calcutta FC Ground in front of 100,000 spectators ended in a 1–1 draw. In August 1938, Mirza was selected to represent the Indian Football Association XI on their tour of Australia, during which they played numerous exhibition matches, including five games against the Australia national team.

== Sports administration ==
After the partition of India, he and his family moved to Dhaka, East Pakistan. In 1962, Mirza served as the chief coach of the National Football Coaching Centre in Dhaka. In the same year, he was appointed deputy director of the Pakistan Sports Control Board to look after sports in East Pakistan. Mirza also served as the Additional Director of Sports in the Central Government of Pakistan. He served in the role from 1967 to 1977 before permanently settling in Dhaka, Bangladesh.

== Awards and honours ==
In 1963, Mirza was awarded the Pride of Performance Award of Pakistan for his contributions to sports.

After the formation of Bangladesh, Mirza was awarded the Independence Day Award in 1981, the highest civilian award in Bangladesh, posthumously.

== Death ==
Mirza died on 16 September 1980 while undergoing treatment at IPGMR Hospital in Dhaka, Bangladesh.

== Honours ==
Kolkata Mohammedan

- Calcutta Football League: 1934, 1935, 1936, 1937, 1938
- IFA Shield: 1936

Individual

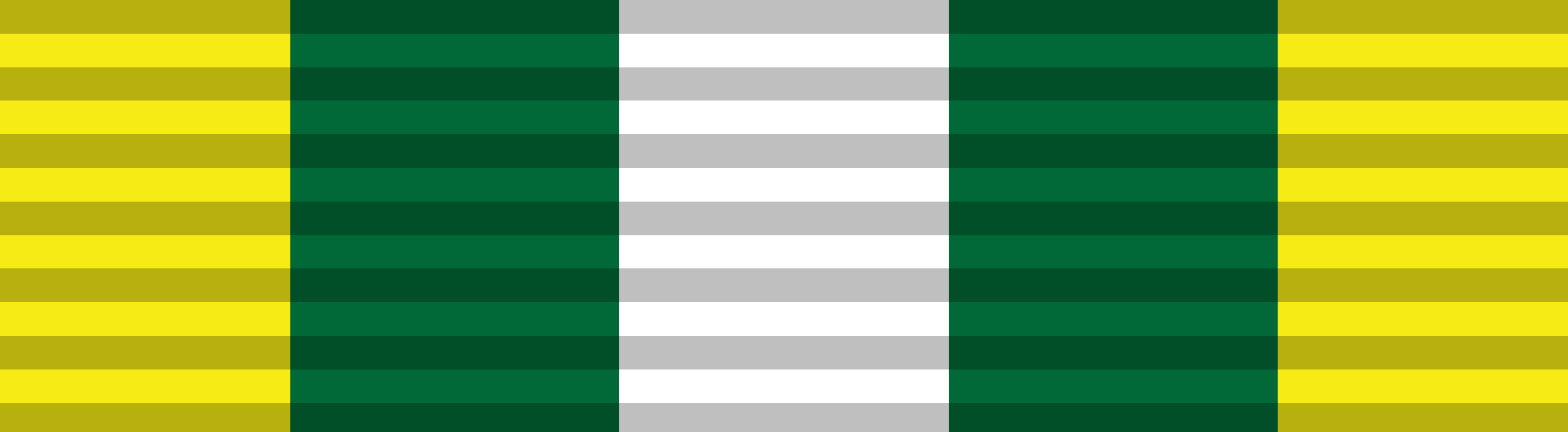
- 1963 − Pride of Performance Awards.
- 1981 − Independence Day Award.
