= Arif Hasan =

Pakistani architect

Arif Hasan is a Pakistani architect, planner, activist, social researcher, and writer. He is a recipient of the Hilal-i-Imtiaz, the country's second highest civilian award.

== Early life and education ==
Born in 1943, Arif Hasan migrated with his parents to Karachi in 1947. Hasan studied architecture at Oxford Polytechnic (now Oxford Brookes University), UK from 1960 to 1965.

He received his school and college education in Karachi; studied architecture at the Oxford Polytechnic, UK from 1960 to 1965; worked in architects' offices in the UK, France and Spain for three years, and returned to Karachi in 1968 to establish his independent practice. This practice slowly evolved into dealing with national and international urban planning and development issues.

== Career ==
=== Architecture ===
In 1968, he started his own practice in Karachi.

=== Current selected involvements ===
- Architect and planning consultant in private practice
- Documenting Karachi's history and development issues and the process of social change in Pakistan
- Visiting professor, Department of Architecture and Planning, NED University, Karachi
- Chairperson, Orangi Pilot Project-Research & Training Institute, Karachi
- Chairperson, Urban Resource Centre, Karachi
- Member of the Executive Council of the Asian Coalition for Housing Rights, Bangkok
- Chancellor, Textile Institute of Pakistan, Karachi
- Member of the advisory board of Environment & Urbanization, the journal of the International Institute for Environment and Development, UK
- Member, Editorial Board of "International Development Planning Review", Liverpool University, UK
- Member, Board of Studies for

- Architecture at the NED University, Karachi
- Karachi University Visual Arts Department
- The Department of Architecture and Planning, Dawood College, Karachi

- Member, UN's Advisory Group on Forced Evictions
- Member, Sindh Cultural Heritage Technical and Advisory Committees of the Culture Department of the Sindh Government
- Member, Governing Body of the Karachi Public Transport Society

=== Activism ===
He has been involved with the Orangi Pilot Project (OPP), Karachi since 1982. In 1989, he founded the Urban Resource Centre (URC) in Karachi of which he is a founder and chairman.

=== Some previous involvements ===
- As Consultant in the 1970s to the Appropriate Technology Development Organisation (ATDO) of the Government of Pakistan, developed models for sanitation, housing and the conceptual framework for research on low cost building materials and environmental issues
- As Principal Consultant of the Orangi Pilot Project (1981–2000), applied and modified the models developed for the ATDO to the self-help philosophy of Akhtar Hameed Khan, documented them and their social and physical impacts and promoted their expansion in different areas of Pakistan and abroad
- Promoted the ATDO/OPP concepts with modifications for different urban and rural contexts as consultant and advisor to different multilateral and bilateral development agencies, government institutions and policy issues, national and international NGOs, and the Aga Khan Network. This led to the establishment of a number of development organisations such as Thardeep
- Was a member of the Governing Boards of the International Institute for Environment and Development, UK; Karachi Water & Sewerage Board; Karachi Development Authority; National Fund for Mohenjodaro; Pakistan Institute of International Affairs, Karachi; Pakistan Institute of Labour Education and Research, Karachi; Karachi Metropolitan Transport Authority; Pakistan Poverty Alleviation Fund; Thardeep Rural Development Project
- Member of the United Nations' Millennium Development Goal's Task Force 8 (2003–2004); Drafting Committee of the National Housing Policy of the Government of Pakistan (1989); Government's 2007 Task Force on Pakistan Vision 2030.
- Member of the External Review Committee for the Aga Khan Programme for Islamic Architecture at MIT and Harvard; Senior Fellow of the Pakistan Institute of Development Economics; and chairperson of the Federal Government's Task Force on Urbanization; and Member, Academic Committee and of the Architecture Board of Studies at the Indus Valley School of Art and Architecture, Karachi

== Works ==
=== Important architectural works ===
- Hasan Square, Karachi, August 1972
- SOS Children's Village, Karachi, May 1985
- Orangi Pilot Project-Research and Training Institute Building, 1986
- Pakistan Institute of Labor Education and Research Complex, Karachi, 2000
- Nagarparkar Guest House Complex, 2009
- Sind Rural Support Organisation, Head Office & Hostel, Sukkur, September 2009
- Crescent Model School, Lahore, 1966
- Sind Zamindar Hotel conservation, Karachi, 2004

=== Important social projects ===
- OPP-RTI – Sanitation and Housing Programmes
- Thardeep Rural Development Project
- Nagarparkar Tallukka Planning Project
- Kareemabad Planning Support Services
- Urban Resource Center (URC)

== Awards ==
- 1983: Best Building Award, Karachi Development Authority (KDA)
- 1990: International Year for the Shelterless Memorial Award, Japan
- 2000: Prince Claus Award: Urban Heroes, Netherlands
- 2000: World Habitat Award of the British Housing Foundation (conferred on the Orangi Pilot Project-Research & Training Institute)
- 2001: Hilal-i-Imtiaz
- 2003: Life Time Achievement Award, Institute of Architects, Pakistan

== Honours ==
- 1987: Celebrity speaker at the 16th Union of International Architects Congress in Brighton, UK
- 1990 – 1996: Member of the Steering Committee of the Aga Khan Award for Architecture
- 1995 – 1998: Master Jury member for the Aga Khan Award for Architecture, Geneva
- 2007: Member, INTBAU (International Network for Traditional Building, Architecture and Urbanism), India Committee of Honour

== Writings ==
=== Articles ===
Arif Hasan's complete works (articles, reports, papers) are available for download at http://arifhasan.org/category/articles

- Resilience, Sustainability and Development:some as yet undefined issues Woodrow Wilson Conference on Community Resilience, 2008

=== Books ===
- Participatory Development, Karachi: Oxford University Press.
- "Understanding Karachi: Planning and reform for the future", Karachi: City Press. ISBN 978-9698380281
- The Unplanned Revolution, Karachi: Oxford University Press.
- Planning and Development Options for Karachi, Islamabad: Shehersaaz
- The Scale and Causes of Urban Change in Pakistan, Karachi: Ushba Publishing International
- Hasan, Arif and Mansoor Raza, Hijrat Aur Pakistan Mein Chotey Shehr (Urdu), Karachi: Ushba Publishing International
- Hasan, Arif and Mansoor Raza, "Migration and Small Towns in Pakistan" (English), Karachi: Ushba Publishing International
- Hasan, Arif, Asiya Sadiq Polak and Christophe Polak, The Hawkers of Saddar Bazaar, Karachi: Ushba Publishing International
- Hasan, Arif and Mansoor Raza, "From Micro-finance to the Building of Local Institutions: The Evolution of Micro-credit Programme of the OPP's Orangi Charitable Trust, Karachi, Pakistan", Karachi: Oxford University Press ISBN 978-0199065097
