= Deedar Comprehensive Village Cooperative Society =

Bangladeshi organisation

- Formation: 1960
- Headquarters: Dhaka, Bangladesh
- Region served: Bangladesh
- Official language: Bengali
- Website: gemcongroup.com

Deedar Comprehensive Village Cooperative Society (Bengali: দিদার সার্বিক গ্রাম উন্নয়ন সমবায় সমিতি) is a cooperative society that provides benefits and services to its members. Md Abu Taher is the president of the society.

Deedar Comprehensive Village Cooperative Society is a recipient of the Independence Day Award, the highest civilian award in Bangladesh. It has also been awarded the Ramon Magsaysay Award.

== History ==
Deedar Comprehensive Village Cooperative Society was established in 1960 by Mohammad Yeasin in Comilla District. Yeasin was a law enforcement officer who lost his job and imprisoned for protesting in the 1950s. He started a tea stall and purchased a few rickshaws. Following the advice of Akhtar Hameed Khan, founder of Bangladesh Academy for Rural Development, he formed a cooperative society to work for the benefit of low income villagers.

Deedar Comprehensive Village Cooperative Society won the Independence Award in 1984. It won the Ramon Magsaysay Award in 1988. It has won the National Agriculture Awards and the National Cooperative Award.

Deedar Comprehensive Village Cooperative Society dug deep wells and started experimental agricultural practices in Comilla District using pesticide and fertilizer. It expanded from renting rickshaws to bricks. Yeasin died on 17 October 1999.

Deedar Comprehensive Village Cooperative Society started with nine Annas and nine members but by 2024 had 200 million BDT in assets and 15 hundred members.
