= Mosharraf Hossain Khan =

Bangladeshi swimmer

- Born: Md. Mosharraf Hossain Khan
- Known for: Swimmer
- Notable work: First Bangladeshi to win a gold medal at the South Asian Games
- Awards: Independence Day Award (1986)

Md. Mosharraf Hossain Khan is a Bangladeshi swimmer. In the 1985 South Asian Games held in Dhaka, he won five gold medals and was honored as the best athlete of the event. During the 1970s and 1980s, he was one of Bangladesh's top athletes and successfully swam across the English Channel.

== Biography ==
Khan is from Tongibari Upazila's Kathadia-Shimulia Union of Munshiganj District, Bangladesh. His father was Bari Khan.

In recognition of Khan's contributions to sports, he was awarded the Independence Day Award, the highest civilian honor in Bangladesh, in 1986.

== Personal life ==
Khan currently resides in Los Angeles, California, USA, with his wife Anila Mosharraf. The couple has two daughters, Mushayra and Sayra, and a son named Asif.
