= Mostafizur Rahman (physician) =

Bangladeshi physician

Md. Mostafizur Rahman
- Citizenship: Bangladesh
- Occupations: Physician, Professor
- Awards: Independence Day Award (1989)

Md. Mostafizur Rahman was a physician from Bangladesh. He was awarded the Independence Award, the highest civilian award in Bangladesh, for Medicine and Public Service in 1989.
