= Index of health articles =

Health is the state of complete physical, mental, and social well-being and a positive concept emphasizing social and personal resources, as well as physical capacities. This article lists major topics related to personal health.

== A ==
Abortion – Accident – Activities of daily living – Acupuncture – Adolescent medicine – Adult daycare center – Advance healthcare directive – Aerobic exercise – Ageing – Alcoholism – Allergy – Alternative medicine – Amputation – Anaerobic exercise – Anaesthesia – Anatomical pathology – Anatomical terms of motion – Anatomy – Andrology – Animal-assisted therapy – Antibiotic resistance – Appetite – Assisted reproductive technology – Athletic training – Audiology – Autoimmune disease – Auxology

== B ==
Bacteria – Bariatric surgery – Basic life support – Binge eating – Biomedical research – Biomedical technology – Bipolar disorder – Birth attendant – Birth control – Blood diseases – Blood test – Body composition – Body mass index – Body shaping – Brain death

== C ==
Cancer – Chemotherapy – Childbirth – Chiropractic – Clinical chemistry – Clinical death – Cognitive enhancement – Cognitive therapy – Collaborative therapy – Communicable disease – Community-based rehabilitation – Community health – Complementary medicine – Convalescence – Cryosurgery

== D ==
Death – Deficiency disease – Dentistry – Dermatology – Detoxification – Developmental disability – Diabetes – Diagnosis – Diet (nutrition) – Diet and obesity – Dietary fiber – Dietary supplement – Dieting – Dietitian – Digestion – Digestive system – Digestive tract – Diphtheria – Disability – Disease – Disease registry – Doctor–patient relationship – Dysarthria – Dyslexia

== E ==
Ecological health – Effects of meditation – Energy medicine – Environmental health – Enzyme – Epidemic – Eugenics – Evidence-based medicine – Evidence-based practice – Evolutionary medicine – Exercise – Exercise equipment – Exercise physiology – Experimental drug

== F ==
Fad diet – Faith healing – Family-centered care – Family planning – Famine – Fast food – Female infertility – Fertility – Fetal alcohol syndrome – Folk medicine – Food – Food additive – Food allergy – Food groups – Food pyramid (nutrition) – Food quality – Food safety – Food science – Food technology – Forensic pathology – Free clinic – Functional diversity (disability)

== G ==
Gene therapy – General fitness training – General surgery – Genetic counseling – Genetic engineering – Genetically modified organism – Genetics – Genital integrity – Genitourinary medicine – Genome – Genome project – Genomics – Geriatric sexology – Geriatrics – Gerontology – Global health – Gynaecology

== H ==
Hair loss – Hand surgery – Healer (alternative medicine) – Healing – Health – Health care – Health care system – Health claims on food labels – Health economics – Health education – Health effects from noise – Health equity – Health geography – Health information on Wikipedia – Health literacy – Health professional – Health promotion – Health science – Healthcare industry – Healthy diet – Hematology – Herbal medicine – History of medicine – Home birth – Home remedy – Homeopathy – Homeostasis – Hormone – Hospice – Hospital – Hospital accreditation – Human anatomy – Human cloning – Human enhancement – Hygiene

== I ==
Illness – Immortality – Immunity (medicine) – Immunology – Infection – Infertility – Inflammation – Injury – Intellectual disability – Internal medicine

== L ==
Life – Life expectancy – Life extension – Longevity

== M ==
Macronutrient – Male infertility – Malnutrition – Manual therapy – Maternal health – Maximum life span – Medical cannabis – Medical case management – Medical device – Medical history – Medical imaging – Medical model – Medical physics – Medical privacy – Medical school – Medical sociology – Medical technology – Medical tourism – Medication – Medicine – Meditation – Megavitamin therapy – Memory and aging – Men's health – Mental disorder – Mental health – Mental hygiene – Mental retardation – Metabolism – Microbiology – Micronutrient – Midwifery – Mind–body interventions – Mineral (nutrient) – Miscarriage – Mortality rate – Multivitamin – Mutation

== N ==
Nanomedicine – Nanotechnology – Natalism – Naturopathy – Neonatal infection – Neuroimmunology – Neurology – Neuroscience – Neurosurgery – Non-communicable disease – Nuclear medicine – Nurse education – Nursing – Nutrient – Nutrient density – Nutrition – Nutrition and pregnancy – Nutritional genomics – Nutritionist

== O ==
Obesity – Obstetrics – Obstetrics and gynaecology – Occupational hygiene – Occupational medicine – Occupational safety and health – Occupational therapy – Off-label use – Old age – Oncology – Online pharmacy – Ophthalmology – Optometry – Oral hygiene – Organ transplant – Organic food – Organism – Orthopaedics – Osteopathy – Over-the-counter drug – Overweight

== P ==
Palliative care – Paramedic – Pathogen – Pathology – Pediatrics – Perioperative medicine – Pharmaceutical care – Pharmaceutical policy – Pharmaceutical sciences – Pharmacology – Pharmacy – Physical education – Physical examination – Physical exercise – Physical fitness – Physical therapy – Physician – Plastic surgery – Population health – Positive mental attitude – Pre-conception counseling – Pregnancy – Pregnant women's rights – Prenatal care – Prescription drugs – Preventive healthcare – Primary care – Primary health care – Psychiatry – Psychoanalysis – Psychoeducation – Psychoneuroimmunology – Psychotherapy – Public health – Public health observatory

== Q ==
Quality of life (healthcare)

== R ==
Race and health – Radiography – Radiology – Rare disease – Rejuvenation – Reproductive endocrinology and infertility – Reproductive health – Reproductive medicine – Rheumatology – Right to health – Rural health – Rural health clinic

== S ==
STD testing – Safe sex – Sanitation – Saturated fat – Self-care – Self-healing – Self-medication – Senility – Sex differences in medicine – Sex education – Sexual and reproductive health – Sexual dysfunction – Sexual health clinic – Sexuality and disability – Signs and symptoms – Sleep – Sleep deprivation – Sleep hygiene – Smoking cessation – Social determinants of health – Social medicine – Special needs – Spinal posture – Sports medicine – Sports nutrition – Standard of living – Stem-cell therapy – Stress (biology) – Stress management – Supported living – Surgery – Survivability

== T ==
Therapy dog – Tetanus – Toxicity – Toxicology – Toxin – Traditional Chinese medicine – Traditional Korean medicine – Traditional medicine – Trans fat – Trauma surgery

== U ==
Universal design

== V ==
Vaccine – Vegetarianism – Virus – Vitamin – Vulvovaginal health

== W ==
Weather pains – Weight loss – Wellness (alternative medicine) – Wellness (medicine) – Whooping cough – Witch doctor – Women's health – Workplace health surveillance – Workplace wellness – World Health Organization

== X ==
X-ray

== Y ==
Yoga

== See also ==
- Index of health articles
- Nutrition
- Outline of dentistry and oral health
- Outline of exercise
- Outline of health sciences
- Outline of health
