= Mohammad Yasin (footballer) =

Pakistani footballer (1900 – 1970)

Personal information
- Full name: Mohammad Yasin Gamma
- Date of birth: 1900
- Place of birth: Rawalpindi, British India
- Date of death: 12 November 1970 (aged 69–70)
- Place of death: Rawalpindi, Pakistan
- Position: Forward

Senior career*
Years	Team	Apps	(Gls)
1933–1947	Mohammedan SC		
1951–1956	Ispahani SC		

International career
1956	East Pakistan		
- * Club domestic league appearances and goals

Mohammad Yasin Gamma, alternatively spelled as Mohammad Yaseen Gamma, (1900 – 12 November 1970) was a footballer and coach. He was most prominently associated with his time at Mohammedan Sporting, where he played a key role in helping the team rise to success during the 1930s and 1940s.

== Early life ==
Yasin was born in 1900 in Rawalpindi, British India. He later moved to Nasirabad, Ajmer, where he rose to prominence as a footballer. Some sources also state that he was born in 1905.

== Playing career ==
In 1933, he played an exhibition football match for Basit Institute Football team of Ajmere of the B.B & C.I. Railway on the 14th April, 1933 against the Mohammedan Club, and later against Mohun Bagan club of Calcutta on the 6th April. After his performance in Ajmer, Yasin was recruited by the Mohammedan Sporting Club of Calcutta in 1933, alongside fellow players Hafiz Rashid and Kalu Khan.

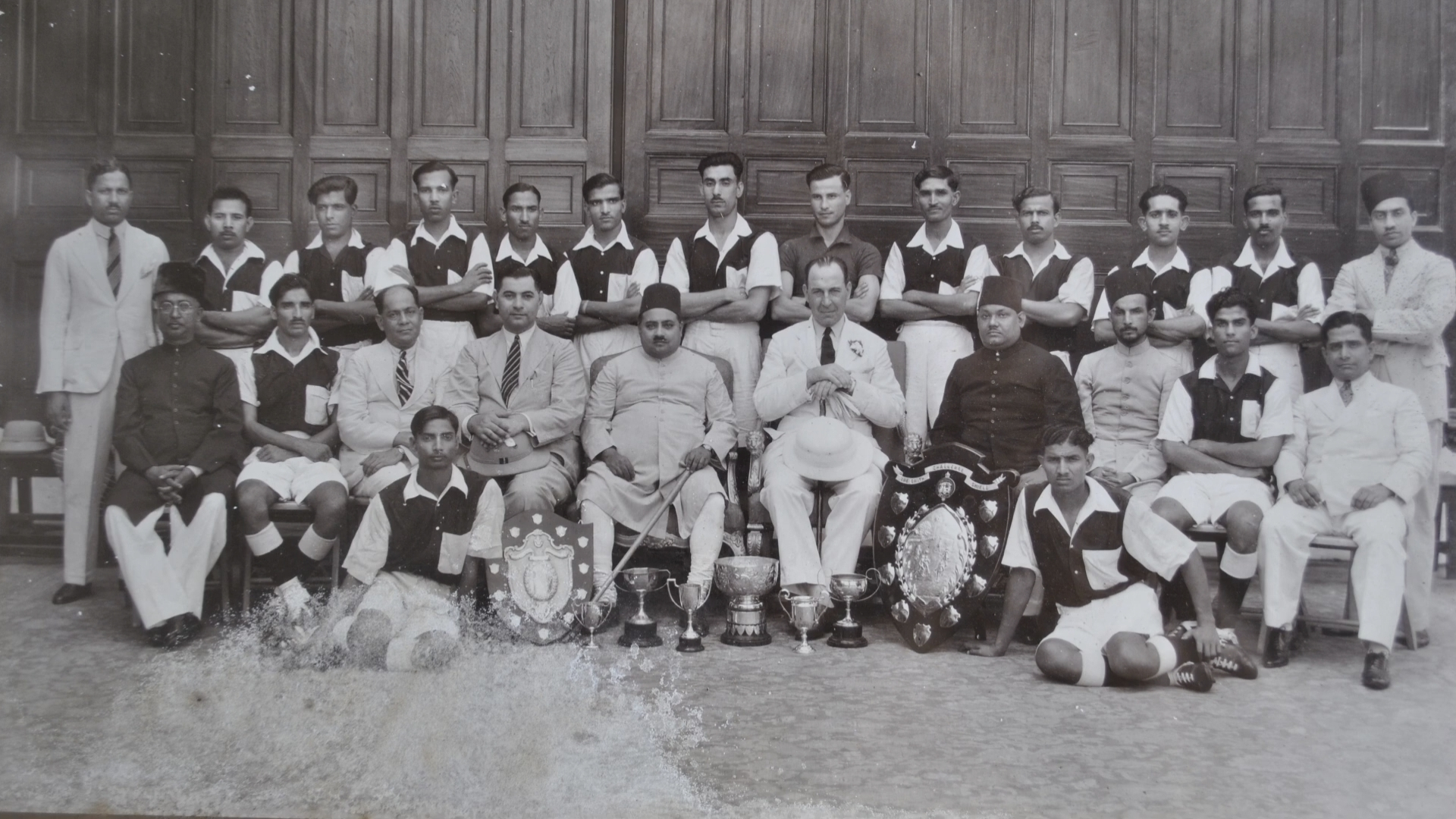
Yasin (standing second from left, standing row) with Mohammedan Sporting in 1935.

The club subsequently earned promotion to the First Division of the Calcutta Football League. Yasin would go on to become an influential player for the club, contributing several goals and assists throughout his time at the club, helping them win the Calcutta Football League on multiple occasions, alongside other domestic trophies such as the Durand Cup.

After the partition of India, Yasin moved to East Pakistan, where he joined Ispahani SC. He helped them gain promotion to the Dhaka Second Division Football League, and also to the Dhaka Senior Division Football League in 1953, before retiring from football in 1956. Yasin was also selected to play for the East Pakistan football team against the IFA XI at Calcutta.

== Coaching career ==
From 1957 to 1962, Yasin was selected by the Pakistan Sports Control Board to serve as a coach for footballers from across the country. He trained players in the annual Summer Coaching Camps held in Dacca. He was also a member of the East Pakistan Refeeres and Umpires Association.

== Later life and death ==
After retiring, Yasin returned to Rawalpindi in 1962 due to his declining form of health, he died on 12 November 1970.

== Honours ==
=== Mohammedan Sporting ===
- Calcutta Football League:
  - Winners (7): 1934, 1935, 1936, 1937, 1938, 1940, 1941
- Durand Cup:
  - Winners (1): 1940
- IFA Shield:
  - Winners (3): 1936, 1941, 1942
