= Md. Nurul Alam (social worker) =

- Citizenship: Bangladesh
- Awards: Independence Day Award (1988)

Md. Nurul Alam was a prominent social worker from Bangladesh. In recognition of his outstanding contributions to social service, he was awarded the Independence Award, the highest civilian award of Bangladesh, in 1988 posthumously.
