= Community-based rehabilitation =

Programs for the disabled

The aim of community-based rehabilitation (CBR) is to help people with disabilities, by establishing community-based medical integration, equalization of opportunities, and Physical therapy (Physiotherapy) rehabilitation programs for disabled people. The strength of CBR programs is that they can be made available in rural areas, with limited infrastructure, as program leadership is not restricted to professionals in healthcare, educational, Physiotherapy, Occupational therapy vocational or social services. Rather, CBR programs involve the people with disabilities themselves, their families and communities, as well as appropriate professionals. Some are doing their own works.

== History ==
In the beginning of the 1960s, efforts to establish rehabilitation centers in developing countries had taken hold in urban centers, but failed to provide support and assistance to disabled people in rural areas throughout the world. The response of world aid organizations was to shift funding from city-based hospitals to rural community programs. The first CBR pilot projects were launched in the 1960s, and their continuing success has led to CBR programs being adopted throughout Africa, Asia and South America.

== CBR Asia Pacific Network ==
A CBR Network is a formal or informal relationship among CBR implementers/ practitioners or their organizations to promote and strengthen CBR. The strength of the network depends on the strength of individual or organizational members and the co-ordination and collaboration between members. It is expected that the benefits from the network will be greater than any individual's effort. To enrich CBR further for the benefit of the people with disabilities, their family, community and the country, a network of CBR practitioners/implementers/promoters is required at least at a national level, regional level and global level.

These networks need to be democratic, national CBR network members need to select their national executive body; e.g., CBR Afghanistan Network, CBR India Network, CBR Indonesia Network. President or the secretary of the national networks should represent the general body of the Regional Network; e.g., CBR Asia Pacific Network. General body of the CBR AP Network to elect their Executive body and representatives for CBR Global Network. While electing the executive body one must ensure that committee represents with competent and committed people. CBR is for all, richness and success of CBR depends on diversity and respecting that diversity. An ideal CBR committee should be of people from various background; e.g., people with disabilities (different impairment groups), academics, people with different socio economic background, people coming from rural areas or representing vulnerable groups policy makers, practitioners, promoters, representative from public and private sectors. Gender and disability balance are the key of the success of any CBR Networks.

Around the world there are existing networks: large and small, formal and informal, active and inactive, etc. For example, the CBR Africa Network is a large network covering one continent.

In 2001 during the first Africa Regional Conference on CBR in Kampala, Uganda, the CBR Africa Network (CAN) was created. It started with four action points:

- Initiate the formation of National CBR Associations.
- Improve capacity for sharing information about good CBR practices.
- Review CBR training programmes in order to promote their synchronisation.
- Organize regular (every three years) CBR Conferences in Africa, starting with one in 2004.

There are other notable networks including the CBR South-Asia Network is a sub regional network and there exists across the world many National CBR Networks.

At present three larger continental (regional) networks are under development or expansion including the CBR Africa Network (CAN), CBR America Network (RED de RBC de las Américas y el Caribe) and the CBR Asia-Pacific Network. One of the main outcomes of the CBR Asia-Pacific Congress was to form the CBR Asia-Pacific Network.

The 1st CBR Asia Pacific Congress provided a great opportunity to form the general body of the CBR Asia-Pacific Network who eventually would meet and elect their executive body and take the CBR Asia-Pacific Network forward. The initial purpose of the CBR Asia-Pacific Network was to promote and strengthen CBR across the continent and in countries; mobilize resources, organize trainings and support information exchange.

Twenty-four country representatives have nominated and selected among CBR promoters/implementers/practitioners, including persons with disabilities, taking gender equity, organizational and regional diversity into consideration. The country representatives of the Network held their first meeting immediately after the Congress. Members present in the meeting have taken the responsibility to form the CBR Asia-Pacific Network, draft a constitution, draw a future plan of actions and take it forward (as a continuation of dialogue) with support from the Asia-Pacific Center on Disability (APCD) as the secretariat of the Network.
