= Comilla Model =

Rural development programme in Pakistan

The Comilla Model was a rural development programme launched in 1959 by the East Pakistan Academy for Rural Development. The academy, which is located on the outskirts of Comilla town, was founded by Akhter Hameed Khan, the cooperative pioneer who was responsible for developing and launching the programme.

While the results of the model ultimately frustrated Khan's ambitions, it has important implications for rural community development, particularly cooperative microfinance and microcredit.

== Origins and purpose ==
The Comilla Model was Khan's reply to the failure of Village Agricultural and Industrial Development (V-AID) programme, launched in 1953 with technical assistance from the US government. The V-AID was a governmental level attempt to promote citizens participation in the sphere of rural development.

Khan argued that for Comilla to develop rapidly, the farmers in its villages must be able to rapidly expand their production and sales. The main constraint they faced was inadequate local infrastructure, especially roads, drains, embankments and irrigation. However, even if the government had the resources to build this infrastructure, Khan argued, the problem would not be solved. Once constructed, infrastructure must be regularly maintained. The benefits of it must be managed effectively based on rules that users could accept and predict. Khan thought that it was essential to develop 'vigorous local institutions' capable of performing this type of local maintenance and management.

The Comilla Model piloted a methodology for stimulating rural development, based on the principle of grassroots cooperative participation by the people. Khan found inspiration for the cooperative development aspect of his model from German cooperative pioneer Friedrich Wilhelm Raiffeisen, whose rural credit unions had been an early example of institution-building in predominantly illiterate communities.

== Implementation ==
To simultaneously address problems caused by the inadequacy of both local infrastructure and local institutions, the Model integrated four distinct components in every thana (sub-district) where it was implemented:

1. establishment of a training and development centre,
2. a road-drainage embankment works program,
3. a decentralised, small scale irrigation program, and
4. a two-tiered cooperative system, with primary cooperatives operating in the villages, and federations operating at thana level.

Considerable emphasis was placed on distribution of agricultural inputs and extension services, for example by helping farmers to grow potatoes in the sandy Comilla soil, and using cold storage technology.

Another key implementation challenge, Dr. Khan wrote, was to ensure that the four programs grew stronger at the same time in a mutually supporting way. In particular,

The relation between the Rural Works and Irrigation Programmes and the cooperatives is very close and vital. The first two develop the productive capacity of the land and increase the farmer's income. The cooperatives safeguard the farmers from money lenders and enable them to modernize their farming methods. The cooperatives promote the accumulation of self-owned capital through thrift and they promote managerial and technical skill through training. Their ultimate aim is self-financing and self-management.

In the villages, the academy introduced a number of pilot projects beginning in 1959. These pilot projects were guided by two goals: first, to provide a real-life learning situation for its trainees; and second, to devise pilot programmes and institutions which could serve as models capable of replication. In guiding and operating the projects, a set of principles and strategies were formulated as the bases for developing the pilot projects, resulting in a unique rural development approach.

== Features ==
The main features of the Comilla Model were:

- The promotion of development and of refining of various institutions, both public and private, and establishing a system of interrelationships between them;
- Involvement of both public and private sectors in the process of rural development;
- Development of leadership in every village, including managers, model farmers, women organisers, youth leaders, and village accountants, to manage and sustain the development efforts;
- Development of three basic infrastructures (administrative, physical and organisational);
- Priority on decentralised and coordinated rural administration in co-ordination with officials of various government departments and the representatives of public organisations.
- Integration and co-ordination of the various developing services, institutions and projects;
- Education, organisation and discipline;
- Economic planning and technology;
- Development of a stable and progressive agriculture to improve the conditions of the farmers, and provide employment to rural labour force.

== Difficulties ==
For various reasons the Comilla Model was unable to achieve its goal. It had particular troubles with government relations and efforts to build strong cooperative institutions. According to Dr Khan:

… in actual practice, the four programs suffered from distortion, mismanagement, corruption and subversion. After independence of Bangladesh, while the First Five Year Plan gave general endorsement, both theoretical criticisms and practical difficulties became more severe.

Escalating loan defaults became a particularly important concern, undermining the hope that the cooperatives would become self-reliant and develop into strong institutions. Dr. Khan reported that influential local people had secured management positions in the cooperatives. "They are powerful and well informed. They know that the old sanctions (certificates, notices, pressure by officers) are now dead, and they can repudiate their obligations with impunity." In addition, the new government annulled loans issued by its pre-independence predecessor.

Chowdhury reports that by 1979 only 61 of the 400 cooperatives were still functioning. He attributes this result to four factors: fraud/lack of internal controls, stagnation, diversion of funds, and ineffective external supervision. The central problem of fraud and weak controls "was possible not only because of individual dishonesty, but because the people were not made aware of their rights, and were not in a position to voice their rights ..."

At the same time, there were difficulties with government relations made more difficult by the departure of Khan for Pakistan.

The officers and change agents were not ready to plan with the local people and to report to them directly…. The dynamic personality of Dr. Akhtar Hameed Khan helped to mobilize and harmonize diverse groups to work towards a common goal for rural development. Afterwards, the contradictions within the Comilla approach manifested themselves."

== Lessons from the Comilla experience ==
Comilla Model provided an experience to be profited by later practitioners. In the early years of BRAC (NGO) and Grameen Bank in the 1970s, both Muhammad Yunus and Fazle Hasan Abed realized that the strategy of including poor people in cooperatives organized to serve the whole community does not always work. Instead, both directly targeted the poorest people, while attempting to keep out those who were not poor. Later cooperative development initiatives in Bangladesh, like RD-12, also targeted the rural poor.

Both Yunus and Abed also attempted to catalyse collective enterprises that were locally owned and controlled. However, problems with internal control and elite manipulation continued, and by the 1990s Grameen and BRAC, along with all the main microfinance NGOs in Bangladesh, had abandoned cooperative approaches and developed highly centralised control and service delivery structures.

In 2013, learning from key reasons for failure of previous village cooperative approaches in South Asia, particularly around elite capture and corruption, Islamic Relief Bangladesh (IRB) adapted BRAC's ultra poor poverty graduation model by introducing Self-Help Groups (SHGs) as a mechanism to galvanise self-help as well as self-managed interest-free saving and credit amongst targeted households. SHGs within each upazilla form into registered cooperatives, acting as platform for building linkages with wider service providers and support to members.

Membership and office-bearers of SHGs are restricted to ultra-poor and extreme poor households within targeted villages. Funds saved and loaned (with zero interest) by SHG members are entrusted to be managed by members as their own revolving fund. Given household proximity and socio-economic homogeneity of the members, there is minimal risk of funds being irrecoverably defrauded or captured by office bearers. SHGs and cooperatives established since 2013 under this approach continue to serve members helping them to multiply and diversify livelihood options whilst avoiding interest payments, lifting thousands of families in northern and southern Bangladesh out of extreme poverty.

IRB was awarded the BOND International Development Innovation Award in 2019 in recognition of its approach, integrating SHGs within poverty graduation model and the results reported.

== Continuing debates ==
The merits of poverty-targeting continue to stimulate debate in microfinance. While many microcredit institutions have adopted poverty-targeting, most cooperatives reject it. The 1st principle in the Statement on the Co-operative Identity affirms that cooperatives are open to all persons in a community. Poverty-targeting is seen as 'reverse discrimination' on the basis of social or economic status.

In this view, the main problem with the Comilla Model was that it neglected the 4th cooperative principle: independence from government. This neglect is clearly visible in the Khan's initial design of the Model, since the cooperatives were conceived of as an instrument for maintaining public infrastructure, and were dependent on the delivery of government extension services and credit for their success. Cooperatives however, have fallen prey to elite capture in many oral communities, and in less densely populated nations than Bangladesh, it still proves challenging to deliver microfinance to them.

== See also ==
- Akhtar Hameed Khan
- Solidarity lending
- Orality
