= Gandhi Ashram Trust =

The Gandhi Ashram Trust (GAT), also called the Ambika-Kaliganga Charitable Trust, is a philanthropic and development organization working in Noakhali since 1946 with Gandhian philosophy of rural development.

Inspired by Mahatma Gandhi's visit in 1946 to Noakhali following the Noakhali riots, it has applied the Gandhian philosophy of rural development, peace and social harmony to uplift living conditions of the rural poor, especially women, in that area. It has a two-pronged approach to developmental and charitable activities.

Initially set up by the original owner of the premises (Barrister Hemanta Kumar Ghose) that were subsequently gifted to GAT, the Ambika Kaliganga Charitable Trust had carried out charitable functions and started working for the 1946 riot victims of Noakhali. Under Pakistani rule, the Trust could not continue its activities due to the policies of the then government.

After the independence of Bangladesh in 1971, with the emergence of the Gandhi Ashram Trust in 1975, there was a shift in the vision and mission of the Trust. Development and extension services for the poor and disadvantaged were taken along with charitable functions. Currently, the main focus of Gandhi Ashram Trust is the development of better standards of living, both material and eternal.

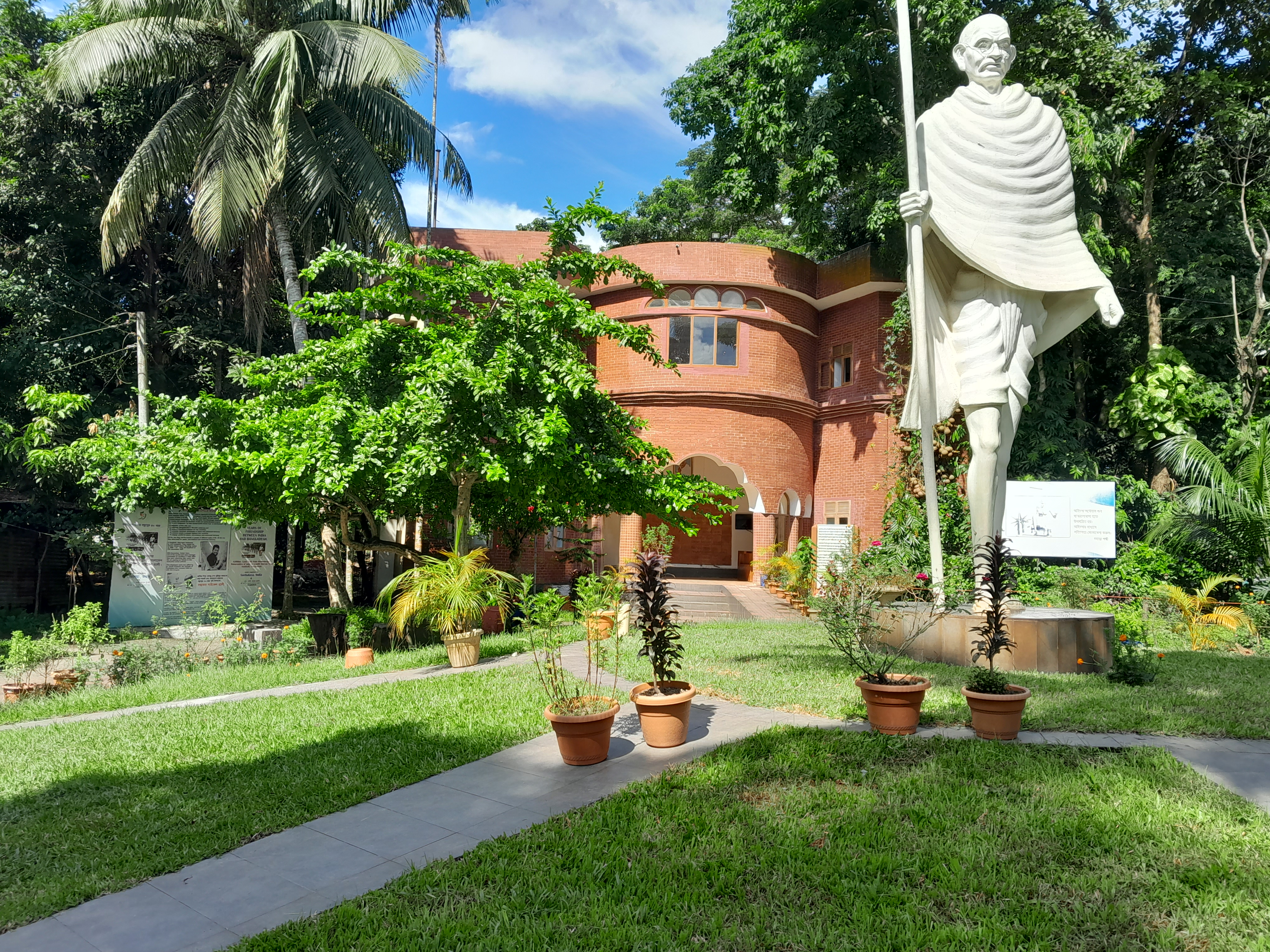

As of 2012, it is working in three districts in southern Bangladesh. Education, women's empowerment, and clean drinking water are the main areas in which the organisation is active.
