= Akhtar Hameed Khan =

Pakistani scientist and activist (1914–1999)

- Born: 15 July 1914; Agra, United Provinces of Agra and Oudh, British India
- Died: 9 October 1999 (aged 85); Indianapolis, Indiana, US
- Education: Magdalene College, Cambridge
- Known for: Microcredit, Microfinance, Comilla Model, Orangi Pilot Project
- Awards: Ramon Magsaysay Award, Nishan-e-Imtiaz, Sitara-e-Pakistan, Jinnah Award
- Scientific career
- Fields: Rural development, Microcredit
- Workplaces: Bangladesh Academy for Rural Development; National Centre for Rural Development, Pakistan; Michigan State University

Akhter Hameed Khan (Urdu: اختر حمید خان, pronounced [ˈəxt̪ər ɦəˈmiːd̪ xaːn]; 15 July 1914 – 9 October 1999) was a Pakistani-Bangladeshi development practitioner and social scientist. He promoted participatory rural development in West Pakistan, East Pakistan and other developing countries, and widely advocated community participation in development. His particular contribution was the establishment of a comprehensive project for rural development, the Comilla Model (1959). It earned him the Ramon Magsaysay Award from the Philippines and an honorary Doctorate of law from Michigan State University.

In the 1980s he started a bottom-up community development initiative of Orangi Pilot Project, based in the outskirts of Karachi, which became a model of participatory development initiatives. He also directed many programmes, from microcredit to self-finance and from housing provision to family planning, for rural communities and urban slums. It earned him international recognition and high honours in Pakistan. Khan was fluent in at least seven languages and dialects. Apart from many scholarly books and articles, he also published a collection of poems and travelogues in Urdu.

== Early life ==
Khan was born on 15 July 1914 in Agra. He was among the four sons and three daughters of Khansaahib Ameer Ahmed Khan and Mehmoodah Begum. His father, a police inspector, was inspired by the reformist thinking of Syed Ahmed Khan. In his early age, Khan's mother introduced him to the poetry of Maulana Hali and Muhammad Iqbal, the sermons of Abul Kalam Azad, and the Sufist philosophy of Rumi. This upbringing influenced his interest in historical as well as contemporary social, economic, and political affairs.

Khan attended Government High School at Jalam (Uttar Pradesh), and completed his education in 1930 at Agra College where he studied English literature and history. He read English literature, history, and philosophy for a Bachelor of Arts degree at Meerut College in 1932. At that point, his mother was diagnosed with tuberculosis. She died in the same year at the age of 36. Khan continued his studies and was awarded a Master of Arts in English Literature from Agra University in 1934. He worked as a lecturer at Meerut College before joining the Indian Civil Service (ICS) in 1936. As part of the ICS training, he was sent to read literature and history at Magdalene College, Cambridge, England. During the stay, he developed a friendship with Choudhary Rahmat Ali.

Khan married Hameedah Begum (the eldest daughter of Allama Mashriqi) in 1940. Together, they had three daughters (Mariam, Amina, and Rasheeda) and a son (Akbar). After Hameedah Begum's death in 1966, he married Shafiq Khan and had one daughter, Ayesha. During his ICS career, Khan worked as collector of revenue, a position that brought him into regular contact with living conditions in rural areas of East Bengal. The Bengal famine of 1943 and subsequent handling of the situation by the colonial rulers led him to resign from the Indian Civil Service in 1945. He wrote, "I realized that if I did not escape while I was young and vigorous, I will forever remain in the trap, and terminate as a bureaucratic big wig." During this period, he was influenced by the philosophy of Nietzsche and Mashriqi, and joined the Khaksar Movement. This attachment was brief. He quit the movement and turned to Sufism. According to Khan, "I had a profound personal concern; I wanted to live a life free from fear and anxiety, a calm and serene life, without turmoil and conflict. ... when I followed the advice of the old Sufis and sages, and tried to curb my greed, my pride and aggression, fears, anxieties and conflicts diminished."

For the next two years, Khan worked in Mamoola village near Aligarh as a labourer and locksmith, an experience that provided him with firsthand knowledge of the problems and issues of rural communities. In 1947, he took up a teaching position at the Jamia Millia, Delhi, where he worked for three years. In 1950, Khan migrated to Pakistan to teach at Islamia College, Karachi. In the same year, he was invited by the Government of Pakistan to take charge as Principal of Comilla Victoria College in East Pakistan, a position he held until 1958. During this time (1950–58) he also served as President of the East Pakistan Non-Government Teachers' Association.

== Rural development initiatives ==
During his tenure as principal of Comilla Victoria College, Khan developed a special interest in grassroots actions. Between 1954 and 1955, he took a break to work as director of the Village Agricultural and Industrial Development (V-AID) Programme. However, he was not satisfied with the development approach adopted in the programme that was limited to the training of villagers. In 1958, he went to Michigan State University to acquire education and training in rural development. Returning in 1959, he established the Pakistan Academy for Rural Development (PARD, eventually renamed as Bangladesh Academy for Rural Development) at Comilla on 27 May 1959 and was appointed as its founding director. Khan became vice-chairman of the board of Governors of PARD in 1964, and in the same year, was awarded an honorary Doctorate of law by Michigan State University. In 1969, he established collaborative links with Arthur Lewis.

== Advisory roles ==
Following his move to Pakistan, Khan was asked to implement the Comilla Model in rural settlements of North-West Frontier Province (now Khyber Pakhtunkhwa), Punjab, and Sindh. He declined the offer on the grounds that the proposals were predominantly motivated by political interests rather than the common well-being. However, he continued to advise the authorities on various aspects of rural development, such as participatory irrigation management. He worked as a research fellow at the University of Agriculture, Faisalabad from 1971 to 1972, and as Director of Rural Economics Research Project at Karachi University from 1972 to 1973. Khan went to Michigan State University as a visiting professor in 1973 and remained there until 1979. During this time, he carried on advising the Rural Development Academy at Bogra in northern Bangladesh, and the Pakistan Academy for Rural Development, Peshawar, on the Daudzai Integrated Rural Development Programme. In 1974, he was appointed as a World Bank consultant to survey rural development situations in Java, Indonesia. He also briefly worked as a visiting professor at Lund University, Harvard University, and the University of Oxford.

In 1980, Khan moved to Karachi and started working on the improvement of sanitary conditions in Karachi suburbs. He laid the foundations of the Orangi Pilot Project for the largest squatter community of Orangi in the city. He remained associated with this project until his death in 1999. Meanwhile, he maintained his support for rural communities around Karachi, and also helped to develop the Aga Khan Rural Support Programme. OPP became a model for participatory bottom-up development initiatives.

== Major development programmes ==
=== Comilla Cooperative Pilot Project ===
The Comilla Model (1959) was Khan's initiative in response to the failure of a Village Agricultural and Industrial Development (V-AID) programme that was launched in 1953 in East and West Pakistan with technical assistance from the US government. V-AID remained a government-level attempt to promote citizen participation in the sphere of rural development. Khan launched the project in 1959 on his return from Michigan, and developed a methodology of implementation in the area of rural development on the principle of grassroots-level participation. Initially, the aim was to provide a development model of programmes and institutions that could be replicated across the country. Advisory support in this respect was provided by experts from Harvard and Michigan State Universities, the Ford Foundation, and USAID.

Comilla Model simultaneously addressed the problems that were caused by the inadequacy of both local infrastructure and institutions through a range of integrated programmes. The initiatives included the establishment in every thana of: a training and development centre; a road-drainage embankment works programme; a decentralized, small scale irrigation programme; and, a two-tiered cooperative system with primary cooperatives operating in the villages, and federations operating at sub-district level.

After Khan's departure from Comilla, the cooperative's model failed in independent Bangladesh because only a few occupational groups managed to achieve the desired success. By 1979, only 61 of the 400 cooperatives were functioning. The model actually fell prey to the ineffective internal and external controls, stagnation, and diversion of funds. However, Khan's leadership skills during the course of his association with the project remained a source of inspiration for these leaders, as well as other participatory development initiatives in the country.

=== Orangi Pilot Project ===
The Orangi poverty alleviation project (known as the Orangi Pilot Project, or OPP) was initiated by Khan as an NGO in 1980. Orangi is located on the northwest periphery of Karachi. At that time, it was the largest of the city's approximately 650 low-income squatter settlements (known as katchi abadi). The locality was first developed in 1963 as a government township of 5 square kilometres (1,236 acres). The influx of migrants after the creation of Bangladesh swelled the settlement to about one million people crowded over an area of more than 32 square kilometres (7,907 acres). The working class multi-ethnic population was predominantly composed of day labourers, skilled workers, artisans, small shopkeepers, peddlers and low-income white collar workers. The project proved an impetus to the socio-economic development of the population of the area. As the project director, Khan proved to be a dynamic and innovative leader. The project initially focused on creating a system of underground sewers, using local materials and labour, and succeeded in laying hundreds of kilometres of drainage pipes along with auxiliary facilities. Within a decade of the initiative, local residents had established schools, health clinics, women's work centres, cooperative stores and a credit organisation to finance enterprise projects. By 1993, OPP had managed to provide low-cost sewers to more than 72,000 houses. The project subsequently diversified into a number of programmes, including a people's financed and managed low-cost sanitation programme; a housing programme; a basic health and family planning programme; a programme of supervised credit for small family enterprise units; an education programme; and a rural development programme in the nearby villages.

Comparing the OPP with Comilla project, Akhter Hameed Khan once commented:

The Orangi Pilot Project was very different from the Comilla Academy. OPP was a private body, dependent for its small fixed budget on another NGO. The vast resources and support of the government, Harvard advisors, MSU, and Ford Foundation was missing. OPP possessed no authority, no sanctions. It may observe and investigate but it could only advise, not enforce.

The successful OPP model became an inspiration for other municipalities around the country. In 1999, Khan helped to create Lodhran Pilot Project (LPP) to collaborate with Lodhran municipal committee. Learning from past experiences, the project extended its scope to the whole town instead of concentrating on low-income settlements only. The municipal partnership was itself a new initiative that ensured wider civic co-operation.

The success of OPP did come at a cost for Dr Khan as his liberal views and self-help initiatives were questioned and criticised by certain interest groups. At two occasions, he was accused of blasphemy. However, all allegations against him were acquitted by the courts of law and cleared by independent religious scholars.

== Death ==
In 1999, Khan was visiting his family in the United States when he suffered from kidney failure. He died of myocardial infarction on 9 October in Indianapolis at the age of 85. His body was flown to Karachi on 15 October, where he was buried on the grounds of the OPP office compound.

== Legacy ==
Khan's ideology and leadership skills were a source of inspiration for his students and colleagues, and continue to serve as guiding principles even after his death. Edgar Owens, who became an admirer of Khan's ideology while working at USAID's Asia Bureau, co-authored a book with Robert Shaw as a result of observations and discussions with Khan at Comilla Academy. A later study of various rural development experiences from South Asia, edited by Uphoff and Cambell (1983) was jointly dedicated to Khan and Owens.

Soon after Khan's death, on 10 April 2000, the Government of Pakistan renamed the National Centre for Rural Development the Akhter Hameed Khan National Centre for Rural Development and Municipal Administration.

Later in 2005, the Council of Social Sciences, Pakistan, in collaboration with the National Rural Support Programme and other institutions, announced the Akhter Hameed Khan Memorial Award. The annual cash award is given on Khan's birthday to a Pakistani author for a book on issues related to rural and urban development, peace, poverty alleviation, or gender discrimination. At the occasion of the award ceremony in 2006, a documentary film about the life and times of Akhter Hameed Khan was premiered. The film includes archival footage and interviews with family members, colleagues, and contributors and beneficiaries of the Comilla and OPP projects.

The Akhter Hameed Khan Resource Centre (AHK Resource Center)was established in Islamabad, under the auspices of the Institute of Rural Management, as a repository of published and digital resources on rural development. The Akhter Hameed Khan Resource Center was initially formed in 2010 as a repository of works and writings by Khan and his mentee Shoaib Sultan Khan; after 2015 the resource center transitioned into an NGO that established an experimental site in urban development in Dhok Hassu, Rawalpindi.

== Awards and honours ==
Khan received the following civil awards:

- Jinnah Award (Posthumous, 2004) for services to people as founder of the Orangi Pilot Project.
- Nishan-e-Imtiaz (Posthumous, 2001) for services to the community.
- Ramon Magsaysay Award (31 August 1963, Manila, Philippines) for services to rural development.
- Sitara-e-Pakistan (1961) for pioneering work in rural development.

== Publications ==
Khan was fluent in Arabic, Bengali, English, Hindi, Pali, Persian, and Urdu. He wrote several reports and monographs, mostly relating to rural development in general or his various successful and model initiatives in particular. He also published collections of poems and travelogues in Urdu.

=== In English ===
- 1956, Bengal Reminiscences, vol 1, 2 & 3. Comilla Academy (now the Bangladesh Academy for Rural Development), Comilla, Bangladesh.
- 1965, Rural Development in East Pakistan, Speeches By Akhter Hameed Khan. Asian Studies Center, Michigan State University.
- 1974, Institutions for rural development in Indonesia, Pakistan Academy for Rural Development. Karachi.
- 1985, Rural development in Pakistan. Vanguard Books. Lahore.
- 1994, What I learnt in Comilla and Orangi. Paper presented at the South Asian Association for Regional Cooperation (SAARC) seminar. Islamabad.
- 1996, Orangi Pilot Project: Reminiscences and Reflections. The Oxford University Press: Karachi. (editions: 1996, 1999, 2005). ISBN 978-0-19-597986-2
- 1997 The sanitation gap: Development's deadly menace . The Progress of Nations. UNICEF.
- 1998, Community-Based Schools and the Orangi Project. In Hoodbhoy, P (ed.), Education and the State: Fifty Years of Pakistan, Chapter 7, Karachi: Oxford University Press. ISBN 978-0-19-577825-0
- 2000, Twenty Weeks in America: A Diary, 3 September 1969 – 21 January 1970. Translated from Urdu by Aqila Ismail. City Press. ISBN 969-8380-32-9

=== In Urdu ===
- 1972, Safar-e-Amrika ki Diary (A Diary of Travels in America). The City Press: Karachi. 2nd Edition: Atlantis Publications, Karachi 2017.
- 1988, Chiragh aur Kanwal (Collection of poems in Urdu). Saad Publishers. Karachi.

== See also ==
- Civil society
- Social entrepreneurship
- Social innovation
