= Bangladesh Academy for Rural Development =

Independence Day award recipient institution

- Type: Rural development academy
- Founded: 1959; 67 years ago, East Pakistan
- Headquarters: Comilla, Bangladesh
- Key people: Akhtar Hameed Khan
- Website: bard.gov.bd

Bangladesh Academy for Rural Development (BARD; Bengali: বাংলাদেশ পল্লী উন্নয়ন একাডেমী (বার্ড)) started its journey on 27 May 1959 as a training, research and action research institute in rural development. The founder director of this academy dedicated to the leadership of Akhtar Hameed Khan, some researchers carried out continuous experiments with rural people and developed some model programs for rural development in this country. In the early sixties, the problems that were prevalent in rural areas were identified.

BARD is an autonomous organization under the Department of Rural Development and Cooperatives of the Ministry of Local Government, Rural Development and Cooperatives. The Board is governed by a 21-member Board of Directors whose chairman is the minister. The director general serves as the chief executive of the academy, to which an additional director general and nine directors provide assistance. All the activities of the academy are conducted through nine departments, with one director acting as the head. BARD gained fame at home and abroad for the "Cumilla Model" of rural development invented by the academy. BARD received the "Shadhinata Padak" in the 1986 for its special contribution to rural development. The number of officers and employees of BARD is 365.

The academy is known for implementing the Comilla Model in the 1960s, which has been internationally recognised as a model project for rural development in the developing countries.

== Foundation ==
East Pakistan Academy for Rural Development was established in 1959 in Comilla as EPARD under the initiative of Akhtar Hameed Khan, who became the institution's founder or director. After the Bangladesh War of Independence, the institution was renamed to its present form.

=== Location ===
The academy is located at Kotbari, 10 km from Comilla town. The campus is spread over a vast area that also hosts residences, conference rooms, a mosque, a library, a health clinic, a sports complex, and other amenities.

== Objectives ==
One of the main functions of BARD is to provide training for both officials and non-official members of the public and private institutions working on rural development. The training is provided in the form of courses, visit programmes, workshops and seminars.

=== Research ===
The research is basically aimed at collecting socioeconomic data for planning and project preparation. Findings are also used for training and information materials by respective public bodies and planning institutions. Research also relates to the evaluation of national rural development programmes, either independently or jointly with government agencies, universities, and research organisations.

== Projects ==
Since its inception, BARD has conducted a number of large- and small-scale development programmes.

- TCCA — In the 1960s, the academy evolved a new system of rural cooperatives where small farmers of Comilla Sadar Thana were organised into primary cooperatives in the form of the federation of Thana Central Cooperative Association. The model has been successfully replicated all over the country.
- The Thana Training and Development Centre (TTDC) (since 1962–63) is a model of decentralised and coordinated rural administration for development. Subsequently, it was renamed Rural Works Programme (RWP).
- Thana Irrigation Programme — Model for improving irrigation in rural areas under the jurisdiction of thanas in 1969

== Board of Governors (BOG) ==
The Board of Governors (BOG) of Bangladesh Academy for Rural Development (BARD) has consisted of 21 (twenty-one) individuals. There are one president, one vice-president, 14 (fourteen) members, 4 (four) nominated members, and one secretariat member. The president is selected a minister from the Ministry of Local Government, Rural Development and Co-Operatives. And the vice-president is elected from the Rural Development and Co-operative Division. Other members are selected and nominated from the different ministries, divisions, and institutes. There is included a table of BOG. Such as:

Person	Position
01	President
01	Vice-president
14	Members
04	Nominated Members
01	Secretariat Members

== See also ==
- Rural Development Academy, Sherpur, Bogra
- List of Educational Institutions in Comilla
