= Krishna Palepu =

American academic, author, consultant and director of various corporations

Krishna G. Palepu
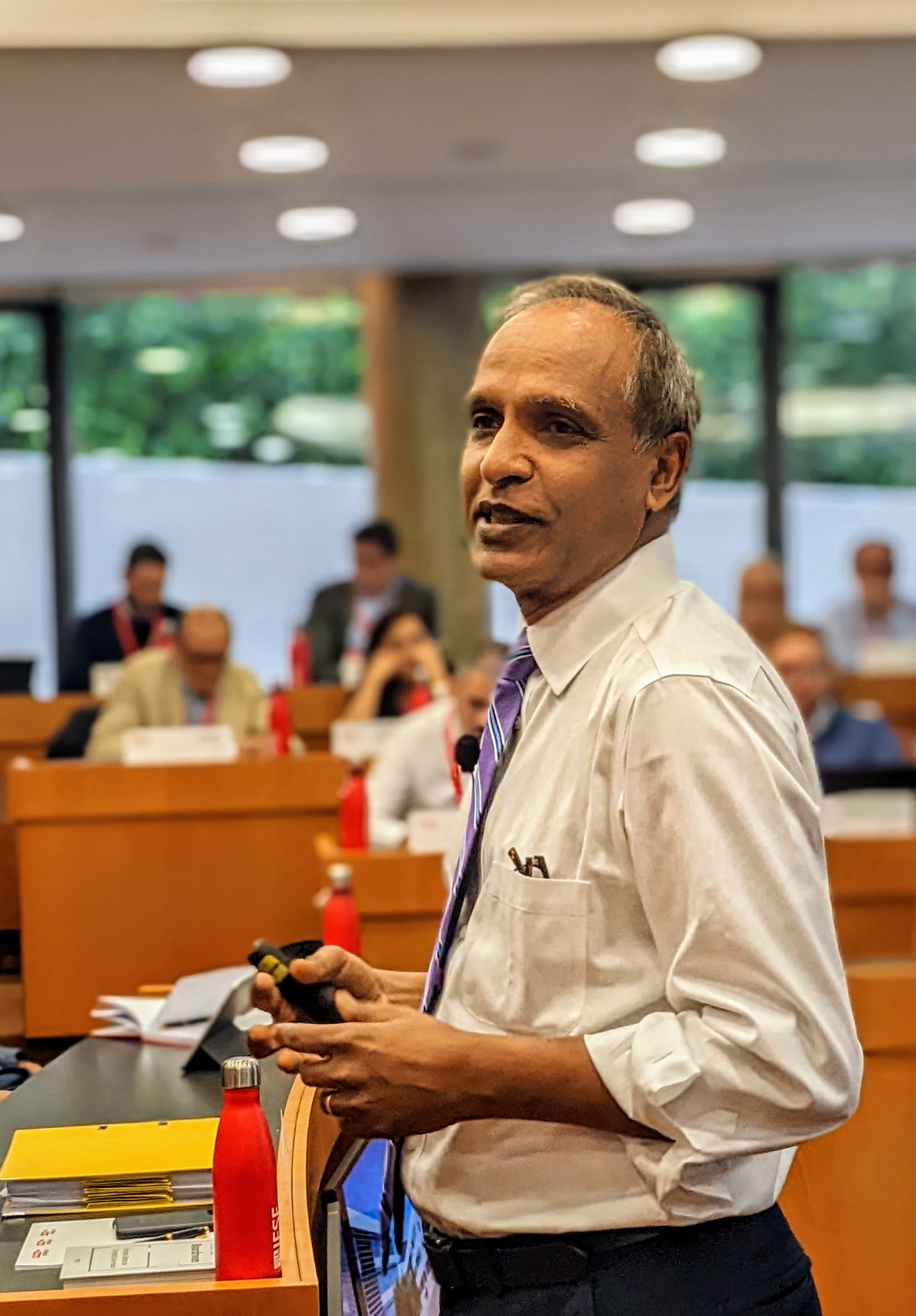
- Palepu in 2022
- Born: India
- Citizenship: American
- Education: M.Sc. (Physics); P.G. Diploma (Management); PhD (Management)
- Alma mater: Andhra University; IIM Calcutta; MIT Sloan
- Occupations: professor, Author, senior strategy advisor
- Board member of: Partners Harvard Medical International; Brooks Automation

Krishna Palepu (born 1954) is an American academic, author, consultant and director of various corporations. He is the Ross Graham Walker Professor of Business Administration at Harvard Business School. He serves as Senior Adviser to the President of Harvard University for Global Strategy.

== Education ==
Palepu has a master's degree in Physics from Andhra University in India, an MBA from the Indian Institute of Management Calcutta, and a doctorate from the MIT Sloan School of Management. He also has an honorary doctorate from the Helsinki School of Economics and Business Administration.

== Academics ==
Palepu's research has been in the areas of strategy in emerging markets, corporate governance and corporate disclosure. His work focuses on making corporate boards more effective, and improving corporate disclosure. In the area of strategy, his focus has been on the globalization of emerging markets, particularly India and China, and the resulting opportunities and challenges for western multinationals as well as local companies with global aspirations in these countries.

In his prior work, Palepu has done research and published papers on mergers and acquisitions and corporate disclosure. He has been on the Editorial Boards of leading academic journals and is a member of the National Bureau of Economic Research.

Palepu is also a prolific case writer and was placed among the top 40 case authors consistently, since the list was first published in 2016 by The Case Centre. They ranked 20th In 2018/19, 14th in 2017/18, 17th in 2016/17 and 16th in 2015/16.

=== Books ===
Winning in Emerging Markets

In Winning in Emerging Markets, released in 2010, Tarun Khanna and Krishna Palepu outline a practical framework for developing emerging market strategies based not on broad categorical definitions like geography, but on a structural understanding of these markets. Their framework describes how "institutional voids" – the absence of intermediaries like market research firms and credit card systems to efficiently connect buyers and sellers – create daunting obstacles for companies trying to operate in emerging markets. Understanding these voids – and learning how to work with them in specific markets – is the key to success.

Business Analysis and Valuation Using Financial Statements

The fourth edition of Business Analysis And Valuation Using Financial Statements: Text and Cases, co-authored with Paul Healy, was published by Thomson Southwestern in 2007. Based on Palepu's research on mergers and acquisitions, finance and corporate disclosure, this textbook is widely used in college and MBA courses on business analysis and valuation. It has been translated into Chinese, Japanese and Spanish.

The book won the American Accounting Association's Wildman Award for its impact on management practice, as well as the Notable Contribution to the Accounting Literature Award for its impact on academic research.

It is accompanied by a business analysis and valuation software model published by the Harvard Business School Publishing Company. A fifth edition was published in 2013.

=== Publications ===
Krishna Palepu has published numerous articles in academic journals and practitioner-oriented publications including Journal of Accounting and Economics, The Accounting Review, Harvard Business Review, MIT Sloan Management Review, Brown Journal of World Affairs, Strategic Finance, Contemporary Accounting Research, the Journal of Finance, Academy of Management Journal, Journal of Accounting Research, Journal of International Business Studies, and The Review of Economics and Statistics.

He has also published dozens of Harvard Business School cases and course materials.

=== Teaching ===
Palepu teaches courses in the Accounting and Control unit and courses on strategy in emerging markets at Harvard Business School (HBS). He also teaches in several executive programs at HBS.

== Non-Academic Activities ==
Palepu has been a director of a number of companies around the world including Brooks Automation, BTM Corporation, Partners Harvard Medical International, Polymedica, and Dr. Reddy's Laboratories Palepu has a Professional Director Certification from the American College of Corporate Directors. On 8 December 2014, a local Indian court required the return of INR 2.6 crore for providing professional services to Satyam Computers and remaining on the board as a non-executive director without the company first gaining the government's approval for providing such services. The ruling is under appeal.
