= Winning in Emerging Markets =

2010 book written by Tarun Khanna and Krishna Palepu

- Hardbook edition cover
- Author: Tarun Khanna, Krishna Palepu
- Subject: Business
- Published: April 28, 2010 Harvard Business School Press
- Publication place: United States
- Media type: Print (hardcover, paperback)
- Pages: 272 pages
- ISBN: 978-1-4221-6695-6
- Preceded by: Business Analysis and Valuation (Palepu)

Winning In Emerging Markets: A Roadmap for Strategy and Execution is a book written by Harvard Business School professors, Tarun Khanna and Krishna Palepu. It was published in 2010 by Harvard Business School Press.

== Synopsis ==
In Winning in Emerging Markets, Tarun Khanna and Krishna Palepu outline a practical framework for developing emerging market strategies; based not on broad categorical definitions like geography, but on a structural understanding of these markets. Their framework describes how “institutional voids” - the absence of intermediaries like market research firms and credit card systems to efficiently connect buyers and sellers - create obstacles for companies trying to operate in emerging markets. According to the book, understanding these voids and learning how to work with them in specific markets is the key to success.

Drawing on more than a decade of research and practical experience with foreign multinational and domestic companies in emerging markets, Tarun Khanna and Krishna Palepu present a framework intended to help strategists and investors assess the institutional contexts of individual emerging markets.

The book offers advice and practical toolkits on determining whether to:

- Replicate or adapt an existing business model in a particular market
- Collaborate with domestic partners or act independently
- Navigate around that market's voids, or actively try to fill them
- Enter the market immediately or look for opportunities elsewhere
- Stay in or exit the market if current strategies are not working

== Authors ==
=== Tarun Khanna ===
Tarun Khanna is the Jorge Paulo Lemann professor at Harvard Business School; where he has studied and worked, with multinational and indigenous companies, and investors in international emerging markets. He joined the faculty in 1993; after obtaining an engineering degree in 1998 from Princeton University, and a Ph.D. from Harvard in 1993.

His book, Billions of Entrepreneurs: How China and India are Reshaping Their Futures and Yours, was published in February 2008 and has been translated into several languages. It focuses on the drivers of entrepreneurship in China and India; and builds on over a decade of work with companies, investors, and non-profits in developing countries worldwide.

=== Krishna Palepu ===
Krishna Palepu serves as senior adviser to the president of Harvard University for global strategy. He is also the Ross Graham Walker professor of business administration at Harvard Business School. Krishna Palepu's teaching and research focus on strategy and governance. In the area of strategy, his recent focus has been on the globalization of emerging markets, particularly India and China, and the resulting opportunities and challenges for western investors and multinationals, and for local companies with global aspirations. Professor Krishna Palepu is also the co-author, with Paul Healy, of Business Analysis and Valuation Using Financial Statements, which won the American Accounting Association’s Wildman Award for impact on management practice.

== Reception ==
Winning in Emerging Markets received a positive review on the CNN show Fareed Zakaria GPS, with Fareed Zakaria quoting "Most business books are somewhat banal, stating the obvious, and often quite boring. This book is neither. It is smart, thoughtful, is filled with good research. It actually is a very interesting set of observations about emerging markets, what makes them tick, what makes businesses do well in them. It’s a first rate guide to emerging markets, really worth reading.”

Muhtar Kent, Chairman and CEO of the Coca-Cola Company quoted "The scope of this book’s research is broad and deep, the authors’ thinking is deliberate and well tested, and the result is a compelling must-read for any leader who is seeking sustainable growth in dynamic emerging markets."

Dominic Barton, Worldwide Managing Director of McKinsey & Company, stated "Learning to compete in emerging markets is one of the greatest challenges facing global businesses today. In this book, Tarun Khanna and Krishna Palepu show leaders how to navigate the different operating conditions in these markets and how to take advantage of the tremendous growth opportunities they offer in the twenty-first century."

The founder and Chairman of Infosys, N.R. Narayana Murthy, reviewed the book saying "Emerging markets have piqued the interest of many business scholars. Much has been written about them, but this book is unique in that it proposes an actionable framework for assessing the challenges and opportunities associated with the institutional voids in such markets."
