= Thomas Hutzschenreuter =

German economist (born 1971)

Thomas Hutzschenreuter (born 12 February 1971) is a German economist. He holds the chair of strategic and international management at the TUM School of Management.

== Academic career ==
From 1991 to 1995 Hutzschenreuter studied business administration at Gießen University. In 1997 he received his doctoral degree from Leipzig Graduate School of Management, where he also received his habilitation degree in 2001. He was visiting scholar at University of Illinois Urbana-Champaign.

In 2001, Hutzschenreuter took over his first professorship at Boston University as assistant professor for International Management. Furthermore, he regularly holds visiting professorships abroad, e.g. at Duke University, Fuqua School of Business, as well as at Florida International University.

From 2002 to 2015 Hutzschenreuter held the chair of corporate strategy and governance at WHU – Otto Beisheim School of Management. There, in 2007/2008, he was in charge of the project "WHU 2020", which formed the basis of WHU's growth strategy, as well as of the project "WHU Governance" in 2008/2009, which resulted in a new constitution. From 2011 to 2014 Hutzschenreuter was the first Director Research of WHU. During his years at WHU Hutzschenreuter was also visiting professor at Bucerius Law School.

Since 2016, Hutzschenreuter holds the Chair of Strategic and International Management at Technical University of Munich.

Hutzschenreuter has been invited by multiple international universities and institutions to give lectures and speeches. He has extensive experience in designing strategies and governance structures. He worked for leading large and medium-sized enterprises from different industries and conducted multiple research cooperation projects with renowned organizations.

== Research areas ==
Hutzschenreuter's research focuses on strategic and international management, (international) growth strategies and portfolio changes, strategic innovations, offshoring and business process outsourcing as well as strategy processes and corporate governance. Hutzschenreuter published in leading international journals, such as Strategic Management Journal, Journal of International Business Studies, Journal of Management Studies, Journal of Management, Leadership Quarterly, and Strategic Organization.

== Activities in academic organizations ==
Hutzschenreuter is senior editor of Management and Organization Review and department editor of Business Research. He is a board member of several renowned international journals (e.g. Journal of International Business Studies) and a member of various national and international academic organizations, such as Academy of Management, Strategic Management Society, Academy of International Business, and Schmalenbach Gesellschaft.

Hutzschenreuter is, for Germany, the exclusive member of the Offshoring Research Network (ORN).

In 2005–2007. Hutzschenreuter organized as a conference chair the 'Annual Conference on Corporate Strategy' with leading national and international academic and business experts in the field of strategy.

Hutzschenreuter is the founding chairman of the section "Strategic Management" in the German Academic Association for Business Research (VHB).

== Prizes and awards ==
Hutzschenreuter's research received multiple international and national awards, such as the "Haynes Prize for the Most Promising Scholar in International Business" by the Academy of International Business, the "Best Annual Paper Award" by the Journal of Management Studies, and the "Best Annual Paper Award" by the German Academic Association for Business Research (VHB). He received the "TUM Executive Education Award for Teaching Excellence" by the Technical University of Munich and the "Best Teacher Award" by Bucerius Law School and WHU. The journal Management and Organization Review honored him with the "Best Senior Editor 2016" award.

== Selected publications ==
=== Articles in peer-reviewed scholarly journals ===
- Hutzschenreuter T., Matt T.: „MNE Internationalization patterns, the roles of knowledge stocks, and the portfolio of MNE subsidiaries". Journal of International Business Studies. 2017; Vol. 48, Issue 9, pp. 1131–1150.
- Hutzschenreuter T., Horstkotte J.: „Performance Effects of Top Management Team Demographic Faultlines in the Process of Product Diversification". Strategic Management Journal. 2013; Vol. 34, Issue 6, pp. 704–726.
- Hutzschenreuter T., Kleindienst I., Greger, C.: „How new leaders affect strategic change following a succession event: A critical review of the literature". The Leadership Quarterly. 2012; Vo. 23, Issue 5, pp. 729–755.
- Hutzschenreuter T., Voll J., Verbeke A.: „The impact of added cultural distance and cultural diversity on international expansion patterns: A Penrosean perspective". Journal of Management Studies. 2011; Vol. 48, Issue 2, pp. 305–329.
- Hutzschenreuter T, Gröne, F: „Product and Geographic Scope Changes of Multinational Enterprises in Response to International Competition". Journal of International Business Studies. 2009; Vol. 40, Issue 7, pp. 1149–1170. Winner of the Best Paper Award 2010 of the German Academic Association for Business Research (VHB).
- Hutzschenreuter T, Gröne F: „Changing Vertical Integration Strategies under Pressure from Foreign Competition: The Case of US and German Multinationals". Journal of Management Studies. 2009; Vol. 46, Issue 2, pp. 269–307. Winner of the "Best Paper 2009 Award" of the Journal of Management Studies.
- Hutzschenreuter T., Voll J.: „Performance Effects of "Added Cultural Distance" in the Path of International Expansion: the Case of German Multinational Enterprises". Journal of International Business Studies. 2008; Vol. 39, Issue 1, pp. 53–70.
- Hutzschenreuter T., Pedersen T., Volberda H.: „Internationalization - The Role of Path Dependency and Managerial Intentionality: A Perspective on International Business Research". Journal of International Business Studies. 2007; Vol. 38, Issue 7, pp. 1055–1068.
- Hutzschenreuter T., Kleindienst I.: „Strategy-process research: What have we learned and what is still to be explored". Journal of Management. 2006; Vol. 32, Issue 5, pp. 673–720.

=== Textbooks ===
- Hutzschenreuter, T.: Allgemeine Betriebswirtschaftslehre – Grundlagen mit zahlreichen Praxisbeispielen. 6th revised edition Springer Gabler, Wiesbaden 2007 : 2015.
- Glaum, M., Hutzschenreuter, T.: Mergers & Acquisitions – Management des externen Unternehmenswachstums. Kohlhammer Verlag, Stuttgart 2010.
- Hutzschenreuter, T., Dresel, S., Ressler, W.: Offshoring von Zentralbereichen – von deutschen und amerikanischen Unternehmen lernen. Springer, Heidelberg 2007.
- Hutzschenreuter, T.: Wachstumsstrategien – Einsatz von Managementkapazitäten zur Wertsteigerung. 2nd edition, DUV, Wiesbaden 2001 : 2006.
- Hutzschenreuter, T.: Unternehmensverfassung und Führungssystem – Gestaltung unternehmensinterner Institutionen. DUV, Wiesbaden 1998.

== Scope Change Database ==
Since 2004, Hutzschenreuter has been building up, in collaboration with his students, the Scope Change Database (SCD). SCD includes data on 147 listed German enterprises with data since 1984. For the companies included in the database, complete information has been collected as to type and scope of business activities, especially with regard to product- and service range and the regions in which they operate. Thus, the database includes 55,000 investments and divestments of the respective enterprises with data relating to shareholding, involvement of partners, etc.

== Activities for business practice ==
Hutzschenreuter has extensive experience in designing strategies, knowledge management systems, and governance structures. He worked and continues to work for leading large and medium-sized enterprises from different industries and conducted multiple research cooperation projects with renowned organizations. Moreover, he is frequently asked to serve as a speaker and lecturer and cooperates with enterprises and other organizations in executive and transformation programs.
