= Robert Salomon =

American researcher, author and educator

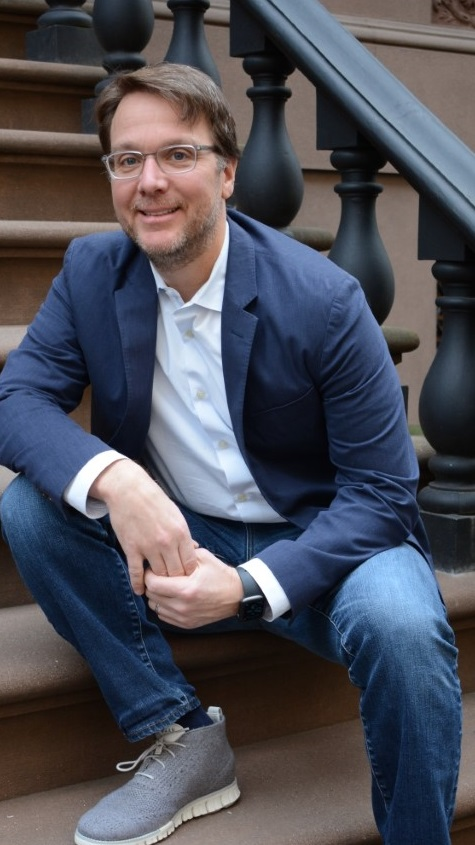

Academic background
- Education: BBA, Finance (1995); M.Phil, International Business and Management (2000); Ph.D., International Business and Management (2002)
- Alma mater: University of Michigan; New York University

Academic work
- Institutions: New York University

Robert Salomon is an American researcher, author and educator. He is currently serving as the inaugural Dean of the Stern School of Business at NYU Abu Dhabi. He is also Professor and NEC Faculty Fellow of International Management at the New York University Stern School of Business. Previously, he served as Vice Dean of Executive Programs NYU Stern. He was designated an NYU Stern Faculty Scholar in 2014.

Salomon's research focuses on globalization. He studies topics related to global strategy, global risk, cross-border knowledge transfer, and social responsibility. In 2016, he wrote an award-winning book, Global Vision: How Companies Can Overcome the Pitfalls of Globalization.

Salomon's book Global Vision was named one of the Best Business Books of 2016 by Strategy+Business Magazine. He won the 2003 Haynes Best Paper Prize, the 2006 IABS Best Article Award and the 2015 Emerald Citations of Excellence Award. In 2019, the Academy of International Business awarded him the silver medal for exceptional intellectual contributions to the field of international business. He was also nominated for the Richard N. Farmer Award and was a finalist for the Gunnar Hedlund Medal. In 2018, he was named to the Poets and Quants list of Favorite Business School Professors.

== Education ==
Salomon received a BBA in Finance from University of Michigan in 1995. He later joined New York University where he received an MPhil in 2000 and Ph.D. in 2002. His Ph.D. thesis received the 2002 Newman Dissertation Prize and the 2003 Barry M. Richman Dissertation Award.

== Career ==
After completing his Ph.D., Salomon joined the University of Southern California's Marshall School of Business as an Assistant Professor of Management. He left the University of Southern California in 2005 to join New York University, where he became associate professor in 2008, Full Professor in 2018, and the NEC Faculty Fellow in 2019. He was a Daniel P. Paduano Faculty Fellow of Business and Ethics from 2011 to 2013 and the Faculty Director of EMBA Programs from 2016 to 2019. In 2018, he was appointed as the Vice Dean (Dean of Executive Programs) of NYU Stern School of Business.

Salomon was a featured speaker at the Global Citizen Forum in Brazil in 2017.

== Research and writing ==
Since the beginning of his career, Salomon's research has been focused on globalization and global strategy. In the early 2000s, his research in this area was focused on global expansion—how firms leverage their knowledge across borders. He also studied exports, and the relationship between exports and firm innovation. In 2007, he wrote his first book entitled Learning from Exporting: New Insights, New Perspectives.

In the early 2010s, Salomon's research focus shifted to global risk. He has studied how firms manage the risks that they face in global markets, and how to price the institutional (cultural, political, and economic) risks that firms face in the markets they operate. In 2016, he wrote his second book entitled Global Vision: How Companies Can Overcome the Pitfalls of Globalization.

=== Global Vision ===
Salomon's book, Global Vision, examines the cultural, political and economic risks associated with globalization; and how to deal with those challenges while expanding globally. Skip Prichard called the book "a guide to successfully navigating the global marketplace." While reviewing the book in Choice, S.R. Kahn wrote that the book provides "an excellent and expansive introduction, resource guide, and practical approach to the impact that globalization will have on an institution’s organizational leadership and managerial expertise as well as a unique insight and clarity into the prerequisites, both tangible and intangible, of a successful global expansion."

It was named one of the Best Business Books of 2016 by Strategy+Business Magazine.

== Awards and honors ==
- 2003 - Haynes Best Paper Prize, AIB
- 2006 - IABS Best Published Article Award
- 2013 - AOM IM Division Thought Leader
- 2013 - NYU Stern Faculty Leadership Award
- 2014 - NYU Stern Faculty Scholar Award
- 2015 - Emerald Citations of Excellence Award
- 2019 - Silver Medal for Outstanding Scholarship, AIB
- 2019 - AOM IM Division Thought Leader

== Publications ==
=== Books ===
- Learning from Exporting: New Insights, New Perspectives (2007)
- Global Vision: How Companies Can Overcome the Pitfalls of Globalization (2016)

=== Selected papers ===
- Barnett, M. & R. Salomon. 2006. Beyond Dichotomy: The Curvilinear Relationship Between Social Responsibility and Financial Performance. Strategic Management Journal, 27: 1101–1122.
- Barnett, M. & R. Salomon. 2012. Does it Pay to be Really Good? Addressing the Shape of the Relationship between Social and Financial Performance. Strategic Management Journal, 33 (11): 1304–1320.
- Salomon, R. & J. M. Shaver. 2005. Learning by Exporting: New Insights from Examining Firm Innovation. Journal of Economics and Management Strategy, 14 (2): 431–460.
- Mayer, K. & R. Salomon. 2006. Capabilities, Contractual Hazards, and Governance: Integrating Resource-based and Transaction Cost Perspectives. Academy of Management Journal, 49 (5): 942–959.
- Salomon, R. & Z. Wu. 2012. Institutional Distance and Local Isomorphism Strategy: Foreign Investment in the U.S. Banking Industry. Journal of International Business Studies, 43: 343–367.
- Martin, X. & R. Salomon. 2003. Tacitness, Learning, and International Expansion: A Study of Foreign Direct Investment in a Knowledge-intensive Industry. Organization Science, 14 (3): 297–311.
- Salomon, R. & B. Jin. 2008. Does Knowledge Spill to Leaders or Laggards? Exploring Industry Heterogeneity in Learning by Exporting. Journal of International Business Studies, 39 (1): 132–150.
- Salomon, R. & J. M. Shaver. 2005. Export and Domestic Sales: Their Interrelationship and Determinants. Strategic Management Journal, 26: 855–871.
