= Offshoring Research Network =

- Launch year: 2004
- Founder: Prof. Arie Y. Lewin (Duke University, USA)
- Managed by: Duke CIBER; Fuqua School of Business
- Partner universities: From Western Europe and Australia
- Website: offshoring.fuqua.duke.edu

Features
- No. of participants: More than 3,000
- Origin of participants: Service providers globally Clients mainly from US and Western Europe
- Research scope: Across industries and business functions

The Offshoring Research Network is an international network of researchers and practitioners studying organizations in their transition to globalizing their business functions, processes and administrative services. The ORN conducts annual surveys tracking global sourcing strategies, drivers, concrete implementations and plans across all business functions and processes.

The ORN is managed by Duke University, The Fuqua School of Business, Center for International Business Education and Research (CIBER).

Offshoring, according to the ORN, refers to the process of sourcing business functions or processes supporting home-based or global operations from a foreign country, either through wholly owned organizational units (captive offshoring/shared services) or external service providers (offshore outsourcing).

== History and current objectives ==
The ORN project was launched in 2004 by the Center for International Business Education and Research (CIBER) at Duke University, The Fuqua School of Business. Dr. Arie Y. Lewin, Professor of Strategy and International Business and Director of Duke CIBER, was the initiator and has been the Lead Principal Investigator of the ORN project.

The findings from the annual research surveys have shifted the focus of ORN research over time. After its initial orientation to offshoring white-collar work, the ORN project has put more emphasis on the global search for talent and offshoring of higher-skilled tasks, in particular product development. Most recently, the ORN project has positioned itself as a research project focusing on studying companies in their transition to globalizing their business functions, processes and administrative services. Offshoring is understood as an intermediary step towards evolving new global organizational capabilities rather than an end in itself.

=== Research partners ===
University/school	Country	Year joined	Researchers
Duke University, The Fuqua School of Business, Center for International Business Education and Research (CIBER)	United States	2004 (Initiating School)	Prof. Arie Y. Lewin, Dr. Carine Peeters (2004–2006), Dr. Stephan Manning (2006–2009), Dr. Nidthida Perm-Ajchariyawong (Since 2008)
University of Manchester, Manchester Business School	United Kingdom	2005	Prof. Silvia Massini
Copenhagen Business School, Center for Strategic Management and Globalization	Denmark	2006	Prof. Torben Pedersen, Prof. Bent Petersen
Rotterdam School of Management, Erasmus University	Netherlands	2006	Prof. Henk Volberda
Solvay Brussels School of Economics and Management	Belgium	2006	Prof. Carine Peeters
University of Navarra, IESE Business School	Spain	2006	Prof. Joan E. Ricart
WHU – Otto Beisheim School of Management	Germany	2006	Prof. Thomas Hutzschenreuter
University of Newcastle (Australia), Newcastle Business School; University of Western Sydney, Centre for Industry and Innovation Studies	Australia	2008	Prof. Stephen Chen; Prof. Oscar Hauptman
EMLYON Business School	France	2010	Prof. Christiane Prange
Kyung Hee University	South Korea	2010	Prof. Geon-Cheol Shin
University of Tokyo	Japan	2010	Prof. Takahiro Fujimoto, Prof. Youngwon Park

=== Sponsoring partners ===
Organization	Sponsored activities	Years
Archstone Consulting LLP	Corporate Client Survey	2004-5
Booz Allen Hamilton/Booz & Co.	Corporate Client Survey (2006), Service Provider Survey (2007)	2006-7
The Conference Board	U.S. Corporate Client Survey	Since 2007
PricewaterhouseCoopers	Founding Member of the ORN Best Practices Institute and European Corporate Client Survey	Since 2007
International Association of Outsourcing Professionals (IAOP)	Service Provider Survey, Academic Conference	Since 2007
Enterprise Software Roundtable	Service Provider Survey	2007
Software Information and Industry Association	Service Provider Survey	2007
NASSCOM, 6th Sense, Genpact, ITAA, Quickstart Global, Sonnenschein Nath & Rosenthal	Service Provider Survey	2007
University CIBERs ^{1}	Academic conferences and associated activities	Since 2007
Great Idea	Service Provider Survey	2008
Wipro	3rd Annual International Research Conference on Offshoring	2009

^{1} Florida International University, Indiana University, Michigan State University, Temple University, University of Connecticut, University of Hawaii at Manoa, University of Kansas, University of Maryland, College Park, University of Memphis, University of North Carolina at Chapel Hill

=== Global search for talent ===
A key ORN finding is the increasing importance of access to qualified personnel as a driver of offshoring decisions. Most scholars have argued that offshoring is primarily driven by opportunities to reduce labor costs and by labor arbitrage effects.

While the ORN surveys confirm the importance of costs, they also reveal that companies use offshoring as a means to access talent pools outside their home countries, in particular for higher-skilled work. This trend has been explained by an increasing supply of science and engineering talent in emerging economies, e.g., India, and the increasing difficulty of finding talent in the U.S. and Western Europe.

It is further reinforced by restrictive visa policies in the U.S. and incentives for foreign graduates to return to their home countries, a recent phenomenon referred to as brain circulation.

Whether offshoring is primarily driven by costs, by the global search for talent or a combination of both has been widely debated. Some scholars argue that science and engineering degrees in India and other emerging economies are, on average, not yet compatible with degrees in the U.S. and Western Europe. Therefore, the supply of qualified talent in emerging economies is more limited than often argued in the business press.

Some Asian companies, for example, have recently hired a number of Western managers.

However, foreign client firms sometimes respond to that challenge by setting up complex collaborations with local universities to secure access to qualified personnel.

Also, recent studies suggest a trend towards modularization and standardization of higher-skilled work allowing for the use of less qualified personnel for lower costs. According to ORN studies, the search for talent and cost considerations therefore depend on changes in technology, education policies, firm capabilities and economic conditions.

=== Globalization of innovation ===
The ORN surveys reveal that more and more firms are offshoring knowledge work, including software development, engineering, product design, research and development. Previously, offshoring was mainly associated with Information Technology Outsourcing and standard business processes.

This trend is increasingly being discussed in the academic and practitioner-oriented literature. The economist Alan Blinder argues that technical processes, such as software testing and engineering support, are becoming easy to offshore because advanced information technology helps decompose and separate technical processes which can then be undertaken and coordinated remotely.

Other researchers argue that knowledge-intensive tasks remain difficult to decompose because of the complex and often tacit knowledge involved in carrying out these tasks.

=== Geographic knowledge services clusters ===
One major factor contributing to recent offshoring and outsourcing trends is the emergence of new geographic knowledge services clusters. In general, business clusters can be defined as geographic concentrations of firms and institutions related to particular industries or fields.

In the offshoring space, a new type of cluster is emerging, quite different from [Silicon Valley], which often serves as a prototype of an industry cluster.

These new types of clusters are highly dependent on foreign investment and are characterized by the supply of specialized talent and expertise that is demanded across industries. One key example of such a cluster is Bangalore for IT-related services and software programmers who have developed specialized service capabilities, which are in demand worldwide in several different industries, including manufacturing, financial and professional services.

Recent studies further indicate that these clusters increasingly show similar institutional features across the world, such as collaborative agreements between foreign firms and local universities, which are a result of local embedding and sourcing strategies of multinational enterprises across locations.

The ORN research team has started to conduct survey- and case study-based research to better understand the development of these clusters. A very recent project, for example, seeks to investigate the emergence of new IT and software development clusters in Latin America which attract foreign investors from Spain and the U.S. in particular.

A longer-term project involves the identification of knowledge service clusters around the world, using a longitudinal study of location choices and the delivery of offshore services from particular locations. Other scholars have also looked into the emergence of offshore destinations, in particular in India, and the factors contributing to the selection of locations by investors.

=== New global organizational capabilities ===
One key proposition raised by the ORN research team is that offshoring is an intermediary step to evolving new global organizational capabilities rather than an end in itself.

In general, organizational capabilities denote the ability of organizations – in this case firms – to deploy and use resources in a way that help them survive in a changing, competitive environment. As companies face various challenges related to offshoring, for example the challenge of attracting and retaining talent, or of losing managerial control and process knowledge, they are forced to develop new capabilities that help them manage offshore operations and that fundamentally transform their internal processes.

=== Academic research ===
Research papers based on ORN data have been presented at major academic conferences in the field of management and international business research, in particular at annual meetings of the Academy of Management, the Academy of International Business, and the European Group for Organizational Studies. ORN research papers have been or will be published in a number of major journals in this field, including Long Range Planning, Academy of Management Perspectives, Journal of International Business Studies, and Harvard Business Review.

== See also ==
- Business process outsourcing
- Farmshoring
- Global sourcing
- Globalization
- Information technology outsourcing
- Knowledge process outsourcing
- Legal process outsourcing
- Offshore outsourcing
- Offshoring
- Outsourcing
- Recruitment process outsourcing
- Shared services
- Supply chain management
