= Yunus Centre =

Think tank based in Dhaka, Bangladesh

- ইউনূস সেন্টার
- Formation: October 2006; 20 years ago
- Founder: Muhammad Yunus
- Type: Think tank; Social business hub
- Purpose: Social business; Poverty alleviation; Sustainability; Microfinance
- Headquarters: Grameen Bank Building, Mirpur, Dhaka, Bangladesh
- Products: Yunus Social Business Centres (YSBCs); Immersion programs; Publications; Events
- Chairman: Muhammad Yunus
- Executive Director: Lamiya Morshed
- Website: www.muhammadyunus.org
- Formerly called: Yunus Secretariat (2006–2008)

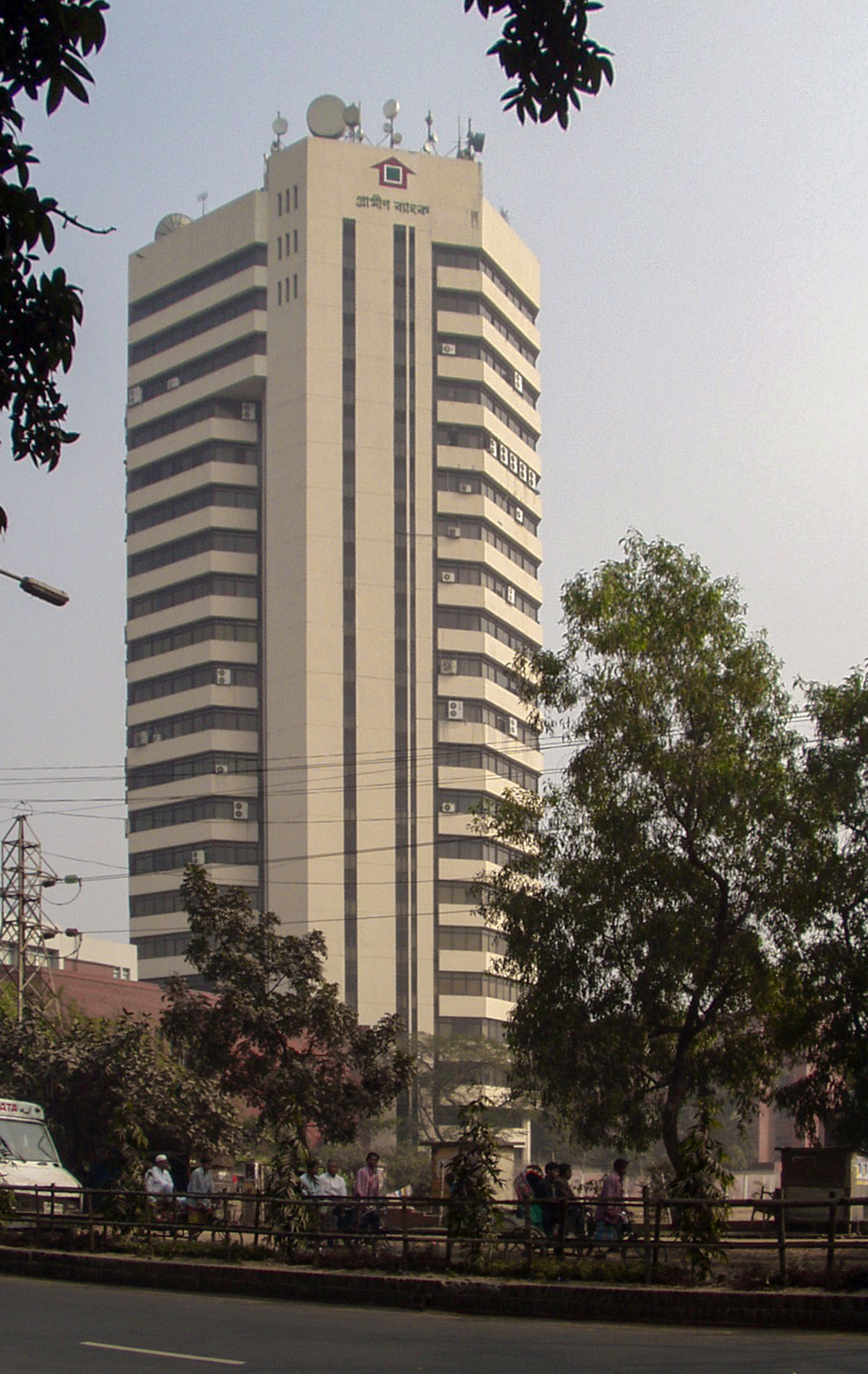
The Yunus Centre is located in the Grameen Bank building in Mirpur Thana, Dhaka

The Yunus Centre (Bengali: ইউনূস সেন্টার) is a think tank and global resource hub based in Dhaka, Bangladesh, dedicated to promoting and disseminating the philosophy of Nobel Peace Prize laureate Muhammad Yunus, with a primary focus on social business, poverty alleviation, and sustainability.

Established initially as the Yunus Secretariat in October 2006 following Yunus and Grameen Bank's joint receipt of the Nobel Peace Prize, it was renamed the Yunus Centre in July 2008. The organisation serves as the central coordinating body for social business initiatives worldwide, acting as a one-stop resource for Grameen-related social business activities, forging international partnerships, and maintaining high visibility for the global social business movement through events, social media, publications, and academic collaborations.

As of 2026, the Centre is chaired by Professor Muhammad Yunus and its executive director is Ms. Lamiya Morshed. It has established 114 Yunus Social Business Centres (YSBCs) at universities and institutions around the world as of August 2025.

The Centre's core activities include the Poverty-Free World Campaign (aligned with UN Sustainable Development Goals and the vision of a poverty-free Bangladesh by 2030), international networking, support for new and existing social businesses, research and publications, development of academic programs on social business, and archiving Yunus's awards and career milestones for a planned museum and digital library. It organises major annual events such as “Social Business Day” (the 15th edition held 27–28 June 2025 in Savar, Bangladesh, themed “Social Business is the Most Effective Way to Ensure Healthcare for All”) and facilitates immersion programs, exposure visits, internships, and the 3ZERO Club initiatives.

== History ==
After Prof. Muhammad Yunus and the Grameen Bank received the Nobel Peace Prize in October 2006, a personal office for Prof. Yunus under the name of 'Yunus Secretariat' was formed. From the very beginning on, the Yunus Secretariat was mainly aiming at promoting Prof. Yunus' philosophy of social business and served as a one-stop resource centre for anyone interested in social business.

In July 2008, it was renamed the Yunus Centre and continues to develop new social businesses, provide technical help to social business start-ups and liaise with anybody interested in the topic. They also publish a quarterly newsletter on new developments in the field of social business.

Following Muhammad Yunus's appointment as chief adviser to Bangladesh's interim government in August 2024, several organisations affiliated with the Yunus Centre—including Grameen Bank and other Grameen entities—received a series of official approvals and regulatory benefits, prompting public scrutiny and criticism. Among the developments were the approval of Grameen University, the issuance of a manpower export licence to Grameen Employment Services Limited, and a digital wallet licence for a Grameen Telecom concern. Additionally, the government stake in Grameen Bank was reduced from 25% to 10%, and its five-year tax exemption was reinstated. Critics, including jurists and civil society members, raised concerns about potential conflicts of interest and the integrity of the approval processes, especially as several legal cases against Yunus and his associates were dismissed soon after he assumed office. While the interim government maintained that all approvals followed due process, transparency advocates called for greater disclosure to mitigate perceptions of undue influence.

== Activities ==
- Poverty-Free World campaign

Yunus Centre is working to promote the United Nations Millennium Development Goals in Bangladesh and all around the world and is especially committed for making Bangladesh free of poverty by 2030.

- Research and publications

Disseminating the ideas and philosophy of Prof. Yunus on social business and microfinance.

- Social business

Acting as the primary source of information on social businesses worldwide and providing consulting services to start-ups. Its New Entrepreneur Project funded 385 projects in 2014.

- The Global Social Business Summit

Created in 2009 by Yunus Centre and Grameen Creative Lab, the Global Social Business Summit has become the main platform for social businesses worldwide to encourage discussions, actions and collaborations in order to find effective solutions to crucial problems plaguing the world.

- Academic programs

Developing curricula for classes on social business. Amongst other, current partnerships exist with Harvard University, HEC (Paris), the Asian Institute of Technology (Bangkok), Bocconi University (Milan) McGill University (Montreal), Glasgow University, University of Florence and University of Salford.

== List of Yunus Social Business Centres ==
The Yunus Centre has established 114 Yunus Social Business Centres (YSBCs) at universities and institutions worldwide, as of 3 August 2025.

Sl	Name of University	Country	Year	Name of Centre	Director/Contact Person of YSBC
1	HEC Paris	France	2008	Social Business / Enterprise and Poverty Chair	Frédéric Dalsace, Chair Holder and Associate Professor of Marketing; Bénédicte Faivre-Tavignot, Executive Director of the Chair, Affiliate Professor of Strategy, and co-Director of the HEC Paris Society & Organizations (SnO) Center
2	Asian Institute of Technology	Thailand	2009	Yunus Center at AIT	Dr. Faiz Shah, Director of Yunus Center and Head of Development Management, AIT
3	University of Salford	United Kingdom	2010	Centre for Social Business	Professor Dr Morven McEachern, Reader in Marketing and Director of the Centre for Social Business; Centre Co-Director: Dr Kevin Kane; Colin McCallum, Executive Director, University Advancement
4	Glasgow Caledonian University	United Kingdom	2010	The Yunus Centre for Social Business and Health	Rachel Baker, Professor of health economics and director of the Yunus Centre for Social Business and health, GCU
5	European Business School	Germany	2010	Danone Endowed Chair of Social Business	Prof. Dr. Karin Kreutzer, Professor of Social Business, Head of Impact Institute; Franziska Schwarzer, Research Assistant Social Business
6	California State University Channel Islands	USA	2010	California Institute for Social Business in Collaboration with Muhammad Yunus	Prof. Andrea K. Grove, Ph.D., Professor of Political Science; Director, California Institute for Social Business
7	Sun Yat-sen University	China	2011	Yunus Centre, Sun Yat-sen University	
8	Okan University	Turkey		International Center for Microfinance and Social Business	Ezgi Yıldırım Saatçi, Head of Department, Business Administration
9	Kyushu University	Japan	2011	Yunus & Shiiki Social Business Research Center	Managing Director: Hiroshi Hoshino; Executive Director: Masaharu Okada
10	National University of Malaysia	Malaysia	2012	Yunus Centre for Advancement of Social Business	Dr. Lokhman Hakim Osman, Faculty of Economics and Management, Former Lt Cdr of the Royal Malaysia Navy and Center for Value Creation and Human Well-being
11	Janusz Korczak Pedagogical University	Poland	2013	Yunus Social Business Chair	Dr. Malgorzata Bonikowska, Entrepreneurship department and President of the CIR
12	National Central University	Taiwan	2014	Yunus Social Business Centre	Dr. Chien-Wen Shen, Associate Professor, Dept of Business Administration; Director, Yunus Social Business Centre Taiwan; Executive Director of the Social Impact Institute of Taiwan
13	University of Florence	Italy	2011	Yunus Social Business Centre University of Florence	Dr. Enrico Testi, Director, Yunus Social Business Centre University of Florence
14	Yunnan Normal University	China	2015	Yunus Social Business and Microfinance Centre	
15	University of New South Wales	Australia	2014	Yunus Social Business For Health Hub	Dr Anne Bunde-Birouste, Adjunct Senior Lecturer at School of Public Health and Community Medicine; Vice president, IUHPE Board of Trustees
16	Daffodil International University	Bangladesh	2015	Yunus Social Business Centre	Professor Mohammed Masum Iqbal, PhD; Dean, Faculty of Business & Entrepreneurship & Director, YSBC
17	National University of Singapore	Singapore	2016	Social Venture Lab	Wong Poh Kam, Professor at the School of Business and Director for NUS Entrepreneurship Centre
18	Escola Superior de Propaganda e Marketing (ESPM)	Brazil	2016	Yunus Social Business Centre	Rogerio Oliveira, Director of YSBC
19	Dhaka International University	Bangladesh	2016	Yunus Social Business Centre, Dhaka International University	Sadia Mahjabeen, Assistant Professor, Dept of Business Administration
20	King's College	Nepal	2016	Yunus Social Business Centre King's College	Nanda Kishor Mandal, Head of Yunus Social Business Center and King’s Incubator; Sushant Rijal, Program Officer
21	Universiti Sains Malaysia	Malaysia	2016	GSB-Yunus Social Business	Dr. Azlan Amran, Dean at the Graduate School of Business, USM
22	SSM College of Engineering	India	2016	Yunus Social Business Centre	Dr. M. S. Mathivaanan, Chairman of SSM Group of Institutions
23	Universiti Teknologi Petronas	Malaysia	2016	Centre of Social Innovation	Dr Shahrina Md Nordin, Associate Professor; Dr Wan Fatimah Wan Ahmad, Associate Professor, Dept of Computer & Information Sciences, Center of Social Innovation, Universiti Teknologi Petronas
24	Kasetsart University	Thailand	2016	Yunus Social Business Center Kasetsart University (YCKU)	Dr. Yodmanee Tepanon, Ph.D.; Assistant Dean, Quality Assurance; Head, Department of Operations Management
25	Pompeu Fabra University	Spain	2016	Yunus Social Business Network of Universities Barcelona	Teresa Monllau, Yunus Social Business Network of Universities Barcelona
26	Azerbaijan State University of Economics (UNEC)	Azerbaijan	2016	Yunus Social Business Center, Azerbaijan State Economic University	Professor Adalat Jalal Muradov, Rector Azerbaijan State University of Economics (UNEC)
27	HEC Montréal	Canada	2016	Yunus centre at Pole Ideos	Luciano Barin Cruz, Professor; Dr. Mai Thi Thanh Thai, Associate Professor
28	Renmin University of China	China	2017	Yunus Center for Social Business & Microfinance, Renmin University of China	Professor Meng Zhao, Director, Yunus Centre for Social Business and Micro Finance, Renmin University of China; Dr. Majid Ghorbani, Vice-Director, Yunus Centre for Social Business and Micro Finance
29	Griffith University	Australia	2016	Yunus Social Business Centre	Dr. Ingrid Burkett, Co-Director, Yunus Social Business Centre; Prof. Alex Hannant, Co-Director, Yunus Social Business Centre
30	Chang Jung Christian University	Taiwan	2017	Yunus Social Business Center, Chang Jung Christian University	Prof. Chieh-Yu Lin, Director, Yunus Social Business Center, Chang Jung Christian University
31	Lincoln University	New Zealand	2017	Yunus Social Business Centre (YSBC), Lincoln	Dr. Christopher Gan, Professor in Accounting and Finance, Department of Financial and Business System, Faculty of Agribusiness and Commerce
32	The Chinese University of Hong Kong	Hong Kong	2017	Yunus Social Business Centre@CUHK	Prof. Wong Hung, Associate Professor of the Department of Social Work
33	Catholic University of Zimbabwe	Zimbabwe	2017	Yunus Social Business Centre	Professor Ranga Zinyemba Douglas, Rector
34	Chandigarh University	India	2017	Yunus Social Business Centre	Prof. Dr. Rajan Sharma, Deputy Director (International Relations)
35	Autonomous University of Baja California	Mexico	2017	UABC Yunus Centre for Social Business and Wellbeing	Dr. Alejandro Mungaray Lagarda, Rector, Autonomous University of Baja California
36	Bethlehem University	Palestine	2017	Bethlehem University Yunus Social Business Center (BUYSBC)	Prof. Fadi Kattan, Dean of the School of Business Administration
37	Universiti Putra Malaysia (UPM)	Malaysia	2017	Yunus Social Business Centre	Dr. Nur Azura Adam, Professor, Faculty of Agriculture, Universiti Putra Malaysia
38	National University of Kaohsiung	Taiwan	2017	Yunus Social Business Centre	Professor Yung-Kai Yang, Associate Professor, Department of Business
39	Ecole Polytechnique Fédérale de Lausanne - EPFL	Switzerland	2017	Yunus Social Business Centre	Scarioni Beatrice, Tech4Impact, Vice-Presidency for Innovation
40	National Quemoy University	Taiwan	2017	Yunus Social Business Centre	Dr. Yvonne Yu-Fang Yen, Director of Yunus Social Business Center of National Quemoy University
41	Dr. Bhimrao Ambedkar University	India	2018	Yunus Social Business Centre	Prof. G. Nageswara Rao, VC; Dr. B R Ambedkar, Director of the University
42	Novel Academy	Nepal	2018	Yunus Social Business Centre, Novel Academy	Dr. Srinivas Madhawan, Yunus Centre Head
43	Epoka University	Albania	2018	Yunus Center for Social Business and Sustainability	Dr. Timothy Hagen, Lecturer of Business Administration
44	University of South Australia (UniSA)	Australia	2018	Yunus Social Business Centre	Professor Carol Tilt, Professor in Financial Accounting, School of Commerce; Dr Sanjaya Kuruppu
45	The University of Adelaide	Australia	2018	Yunus Social Business Centre	Dr Sam Wells, Director, Yunus Social Business Centre, Adelaide Business School
46	Ashoka University	India	2018	Yunus Social Business Initiative	Ingrid Srinath, Director of the Centre for Social Impact & Philanthropy; Priyank Narayan, Director, Entrepreneurship Programmes
47	University of Bologna	Italy	2018	Yunus Social Business Centre	Professor Giuseppe Torluccio, Director, YSBC - University of Bologna
48	National Pingtung University of Science & Technology	Taiwan	2018	Yunus Social Business Centre	Kung-Hsiung Chang, Director, YSBC NPUST
49	Kalinga Institute of Social Sciences	India	2018	Yunus Social Business Centre	Dwiti Vikramaditya, Advisor and Trustee, KIIT University & KISS Foundation; Mr. Suraj Roy Dy, Director - Resource Mobilization
50	Amity University Rajasthan	India	2018	Yunus Social Business Centre	Dr. Abhineet Saxena, Director, YSBC, Amity Business School, Amity Rajasthan
51	Amity University Haryana	India	2018	Yunus Social Business Centre	Professor Aseem Chauhan, Vice Chancellor
52	National Kaohsiung University of Science and Technology	Taiwan	2018	Yunus Social Business Centre	Lin, Chu-Hsiung, Dean of College of Finance and Banking and Distinguished Professor
53	Zhengzhou University	China	2018	Yunus Social Business Centre	Qin Jianwei, Executive Director of Yunus Social Business Center of Zhengzhou University and Vice Dean of Business School
54	Sunway University	Malaysia	2018	Yunus Social Business Centre	Ng Beng Lean, Group Registrar at Sunway education Group and Director of YSBC
55	INTI International University	Malaysia	2018	Yunus Social Business Centre @ INTI IU	Song Kuok Thong, Chair, ASEAN Social Business Conference
56	University of Basilicata	Italy	2018	Yunus Social Business Centre	Valerio Giambersio, YSBC Coordinator, Architect, Director, City of Peace for Children Foundation
57	JAIN (Deemed-to-be University)	India	2018	Yunus Social Business Centre JU-YSBC	Nayaz Ahmed, Chief Operating Officer, Jain University Incubation Centre
58	Universidad Privada Cumbre	Bolivia	2018	Yunus Centre Cumbre	Karla Cronenbold, Director, YSBC
59	Ca' Foscari University of Venice	Italy	2018	Yunus Social Business Centre	Professor Stefano Campostrini
60	Universidad de Monterrey (UDEM)	Mexico	2018	Yunus Innovation Pathway Center UDEM	Yanniz Valadez, Coordinator of the Yunus Innovation Pathway Center
61	IAE Paris Sorbonne Business School	France	2019	Yunus Social Business Centre at Chair ETI	Dr. Didier Chabaud, Professor of entrepreneurship, Past-President of French Academy of entrepreneurship and innovation, co-editor-in-chief of Revue de l’entrepreneuriat (A in French national HCERES ranking)
62	Soochow University	Taiwan	2019	Yunus Social Business Centre, Soochow University	Professor Yung-ho Chui
63	National Taichung University of Science and Technology (NTCUST)	Taiwan		Yunus Social Business Centre, National Taichung University of Science and Technology	Hen, Tung-Hsiao
64	Birla Institute of Management Technology (BIMTECH)	India	2019	BIMTECH Yunus Social Business Centre	Dr. Harivansh Chaturvedi, Professor and Director at Birla Institute of Management Technology (BIMTECH)
65	Krea University	India	2019	Yunus Social Business Centre, Krea University	Dr. Sunder Ramaswamy, Vice Chancellor; Akshay Jain, Project Manager – University Partnerships and Student Life
66	Albukhary International University	Malaysia	2019	Yunus Social Business Centre Albukhary International University	Professor Dato' Dr. Abd Aziz Tajuddin, Vice Chancellor and President; Prof. Dr. Suraya Hanim Mokhtar, Dean, School of Business and Social Sciences
67	University of Murcia	Spain	2019	Yunus Social Business Centre	Alicia Rubio Banon, Vice Rector of Employment, Entrepreneurship and Society
68	University of Cantabria	Spain	2019	Yunus Social Business Centre	Prof. Dra. Ana Fernández Laviada, Director of Yunus Centre of the University of Cantabria
69	Vivekanand Education Society's Institute of Management and Research (VESIM)	India	2019	Yunus Social Business Centre	Dr. Nisha Pandey, Associate Professor and Chairperson Social Entrepreneurship Cell, VESIM
70	Montpellier Business School	France	2019	Yunus Centre for Social Business and Financial Inclusion	Dr. Anastasia Cozarenco, Director YSBC
71	Universidad Icesi	Colombia	2019	Centro Yunus para la Innovación Social (Yunus Centre for Social Innovation)	Professor María Isabel Irurita, Director, Management of Social Innovation
72	Chung Yuan Christian University	Taiwan	2020	Chung Yuan Christian University Yunus Social Business Centre	Mr. Ming-Yen Lee, Associate Professor
73	Católica Lisbon School of Business & Economics	Portugal	2020	Católica-Lisbon Yunus Social Business Centre (YSBC)	Professor Filipe Santos, Professor of Social Entrepreneurship, Dean INSEAD
74	Universidad Externado	Colombia	2020	Externado Yunus Social Business Centre	Professor Jose Mosquera, EMI (Emerging Markets Initiatives) Director, School of Management
75	Mizoram University	India	2020	Mizoram University Yunus Social Business Centre (MZU-YSBC)	Dr. Lalnilawma, Professor & Head Department of Extension Education and Rural Development
76	University of Cadiz	Spain	2020	Yunus Centre Cadiz	Professor Jose M. Sanchez, Director General
77	Gavar State University	Armenia	2020	Gavar State University Yunus Social Business Centre	Dr. Narek Mkrtchyan
78	Ss. Cyril and Methodius University	Macedonia	2021	Yunus Social Business Centre at Faculty of Economics in Skopje - Ss. Cyril and Methodius University	Stojan Debarliev, Associate Professor, Faculty of Economics
79	Universitat de les Illes Balears	Spain	2021	Yunus Centre - Social Business Balears	Dr Francisco Julio Batle Lorente, Director of Yunus Social Business Centre, Universitat de les Illes Balears
80	National Dong Hwa University	Taiwan	2021	Yunus Social Business Centre	Prof. Han-Chieh Chao, Professor, Department of Electrical Engineering
81	National Chin-Yi University of Technology (NCU)	Taiwan	2021	Yunus Social Business Centre	Prof. Wen-yuan Chen
82	Career Society (Career College, Bhopal)	India	2021	Career Yunus Social Business Centre	Mr. Manish Rajoria, Vice Chairman, Career Society
83	Tangaza University College	Kenya	2021	Yunus Social Business Centre	Prof. David Wang'ombe, Vice Chancellor Designate; Dr. Jonas Dzinekou Yawovi, Mccj, Director of the Institute of Social Transformation
84	Karnavati University	India	2021	Yunus Social Business Centre	Dr A K S Suryavanshi, Vice Chancellor
85	University of Abomey-Calavi	Benin	2021	Abomey-Calavi University Yunus Social Business Centre	Prof. Maxime daCRUZ, Vice Chancellor; Professor Euloge Ogouwale, Director of VED-UAC, Social Entrepreneurship Center University of Abomey (UAC), Benin
86	Kampala International University	Uganda	2021	KIU Yunus Social Business Centre	Professor Chukwuemeka J. Diji, Deputy Vice - Chancellor, RICE
87	Tom Mboya University College	Kenya	2021	Tom Mboya University College- YSBC	Prof. Charles O. Ochola, Principal
88	Makerere University Business School	Uganda	2021	MUBS- Yunus Social Business Centre	Prof. Waswa Balunywa, Principal; Watundu Susan, Senior Lecturer
89	Mount Kenya University	Kenya	2021	Mount Kenya University Yunus Social Business Centre	Prof. Deogratius Jaganyi, Vice Chancellor; Prof. Mwangi Peter Wanderi (PhD.), PRINCIPAL CORPORATE SERVICES
90	CAMSCHOOL	Central African Republic	2021	CAMSCHOOL Yunus Social Business Centre (YSBC)	Prof Henri KOULAYOM, Chairman, CAMSCHOOL
91	Sharda University	India	2021	Sharda University Yunus Social Business Centre (YSBC)	Dr. Mridul Dharwal, Professor of Economics, Sharda University
92	University of Engineering and Management, Jaipur	India	2022	YSBC-UEM Jaipur	Prof. Dr. Biswajoy Chatterjee, VC, University of Engineering & Management (UEM)
93	University of Engineering and Management Kolkata	India	2022	YSBC-IEM Kolkata	Dr Rajiv Ganguly, Professor & Dean-Science, University of Engineering & Management, Kolkata
94	Pontificia Universidad Católica del Ecuador	Ecuador	2022	Yunus Centre for Social Business, Popular and Solidarity Economy	Dr. Fernando Ponce León S.J., Rector, Pontificia Universidad Católica del Ecuador; Rubén Flores, Coordinador IIE, PUCE
95	Chihlee University of Technology	Taiwan	2022	Chihlee University of Technology Yunus Social Business Centre	Ju-Long Chen, President, Chihlee University of Technology; Prof. B.Y. Hwang, Chihlee University of Technology Yunus Social Business Centre; F. May Liou, Professor & Dean, College of Business Management, Chihlee University of Technology; Ta Hsiang Hung, Assistant Professor, College of Business Management
96	Kampala University	Uganda	2023	Kampala University Yunus Social Business Centre	Dr Wardah M Rajab-Gyagenda, DEPUTY VICE CHANCELLOR
97	George Washington University	USA	2023	Yunus Initiative on Extreme Deprivation	
98	Universidad Panamericana	Mexico	2023	Yunus Social Business Centre - Universidad Panamericana (YSBC-UP)	Esli C. Gallegos Lozano, Corporate Social Responsibility and Sustainability Coordinator; David Berriolope Galván, Director
99	Université Côte d’Azur, UCA (IAE Nice)	France	2023	UCA (IAE Nice) Yunus Social Business Centre (YSBC)	Yoan Noguier, Yunus Sports Hub, Co-Founder & Director; Professor Elisabeth Walliser
100	National Institute of Development Administration	Thailand	2023	National Institute of Development Administration- Yunus Social Business Centre (YSBC-NIDA)	Dr. Tippawan Lorsuwannarat, President, National Institute of Development Administration (NIDA); Associate Professor Patthareeya Lakpetch, Ph.D., Director of Research Bureau National Institute of Development Administration
101	Payap University	Thailand	2023	Payap Yunus Social Business Centre	Mike Meallam, Director / Founder of the Center for Social Impact at Payap University
102	Nanhua University	Taiwan	2024	Nanhua Yunus Social Business Centre	Dr. Tsong-Ming Lin, President
103	Chulalongkorn University	Thailand	2024	Chulalongkorn Yunus Social Business Centre	Dr. Unnruam Leknoi, Director
104	Pontifícia Universidade Católica do Rio de Janeiro (PUC-Rio)	Brazil	2024	PUC-Rio Yunus Social Business Centre (YSBC)	Ruth Espínola Soriano de Mello, Professora IAG/PUC-Rio
105	Central Asian University	Uzbekistan	2024	Central Asian University Yunus Social Business Centre	Mr Sherzodbek Safarov, CFA - Deputy Dean of CAU Business School
106	Lincoln University College	Malaysia	2025	The Lincoln-Yunus Social Business Center	Jahid Siraz Chowdhury, PhD; Associate Professor of Social Work, Lincoln University College, Malaysia
107	Sapienza Università di Roma	Italy	2025	Yunus Social Business Centre	PhD in Industrial Design, Director of Saperi&Co - Service&Research Center, Chair of the graduate program in Design, Founder and Scientific Coordinator of Design4Materials network, Scientific Responsible of Materialdesignlab, Sapienza Università di Roma, Department of Planning Design Technology of Architecture
108	SDA Bocconi School of Management	Italy	2025	Yunus Social Business Centre SDA Bocconi	Simona Sinesi, Director, YSBC, SDA Bocconi School of Management
109	University of Engineering and Management (UEM)	India	2025	YSBC-UEM (additional or updated entry)	
110	University of Dhaka (or affiliate update)	Bangladesh	2025	Yunus Social Business Centre (potential)	
111	Additional European/Asian entry (if extended)	Various	2025	Yunus Social Business Centre	
112	Additional African/Latin American entry	Various	2025	Yunus Social Business Centre	
113	Final listed university (per source)	Various	2025	Yunus Social Business Centre	
114	Final listed university (per source)	Various	2025	Yunus Social Business Centre	

== Subsidiaries ==
- Grameen Employment Services Limited (90% owned by Yunus Centre, 10% by Grameen Shikkha)

== See also ==
- Muhammad Yunus
- Grameen Bank
