= Nicole Coviello =

Canadian marketing academic

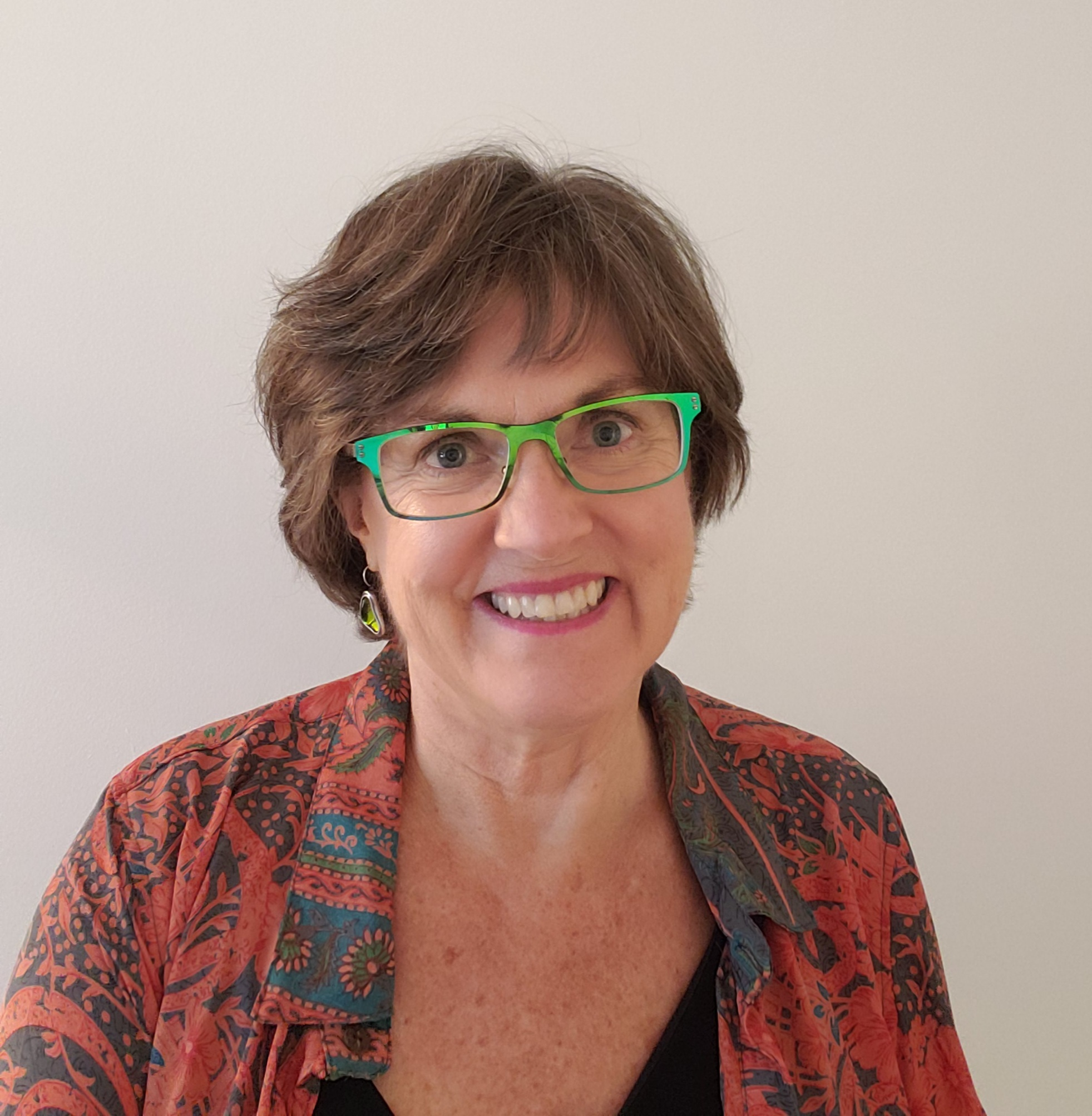

Academic background
- Education: BComm Hons, marketing, MSc technology management, University of Saskatchewan; PhD, Marketing and International Business, 1994, University of Auckland
- Thesis: Internationalizing the entrepreneurial, high technology, knowledge-intensive firm (1994)

Academic work
- Institutions: LUT Business School; Wilfrid Laurier University; University of Calgary; University of Auckland

Nicole Coviello is a Canadian-New Zealand retired professor of marketing and international entrepreneurship. She is currently a visiting professor at LUT Business School in Finland. Prior to her retirement, Coviello was the inaugural Lazaridis Chair of International Entrepreneurship and Innovation at Wilfrid Laurier University’s Lazaridis School of Business and Economics. Since 2021, Coviello has been recognized as a leading researcher by Stanford University, per the list of top 2% of academics, worldwide.

== Early life and education ==
Coviello received her Bachelor of Commerce and Master's degree (technology management) from the University of Saskatchewan. Following this, she earned her PhD in marketing and international business from the University of Auckland. In 2010, she received an honorary doctorate in economics from the University of Turku.

== Career ==
Coviello's career started in 1987 at the University of Waikato in Hamilton, New Zealand. In 1990, she accepted a teaching position at the University of Auckland and started her PhD. She completed her Ph.D. in Marketing and International Business in 1994. In 1996, Coviello returned to Canada to become an associate professor of Marketing at the University of Calgary's Haskayne School of Business. During this time, Coviello published her research on networks and new venture internationalization that helped form the field now known as International Entrepreneurship. In 2002, she returned to her alma mater, the University of Auckland, as professor of international entrepreneurship and marketing. Coviello remained there until 2008 when she moved to Wilfrid Laurier University in Waterloo, Canada. She joined Laurier as professor of marketing and was later appointed as the Betty and Peter Sims Professor of Entrepreneurship. In 2009, Coviello was appointed as associate editor of Journal of Business Venturing (until 2022) and later became a consulting editor at the Journal of International Business Studies. (2017-2022).

Coviello continued to focus her research on international entrepreneurship and marketing at Laurier. In 2014, she was ranked eighteenth in the world for international business, the only female in the top 20 list for that discipline. In 2016, Coviello was named Laurier's University Research Professor, as well as the Lazaridis Research Professor and research director of the Lazaridis Institute for the Management of Technology Enterprises. In 2018, four of her papers were recognized in the top 25 of the most influential publications in International Marketing. These publications included Network Relationships and the Internationalization Process of Small Software Firms, Internationalization: Conceptualizing an Entrepreneurial Process of Behavior in Time, The Network Dynamics of International New Ventures, and Internationalization and the Smaller Firm: A Review of Contemporary Empirical Research.

In 2020, Coviello was appointed as the inaugural Lazaridis Chair of International Entrepreneurship and Innovation at Laurier’s Lazaridis School of Business and Economics. Later that year, she was elected a Fellow of the Academy of International Business and received the 2020 Gerald E. Hills Best Paper Award for her 2012 paper, Creating Major Innovations with Customers: Insights from Small and Young Technology Firms. During her career, Coviello has also received various other awards for research and teaching. Since 2021, Coviello has been recognized as a leading researcher (top 2%) in the field of business and management by Stanford University.
