= Tarun Khanna =

Tarun Khanna may refer to:

- Tarun Khanna (academic)
- Tarun Khanna (actor)
