= Ali Kaiser Hasan Morshed =

Bangladeshi diplomat (??–2023)

Bangladesh ambassador to Brazil
- In office October 1976 – April 1979

Personal details
- Died: 23 November 2023 Dhaka, Bangladesh
- Education: University of Oxford; Harvard Law School

Ali Kaiser Hasan Morshed (died 23 November 2023) was a Bangladeshi diplomat. He served as the ambassador of Bangladesh and the Foreign Secretary. He was the chairman of the Bangladesh Institute of International and Strategic Studies.

== Early life ==
Morshed was born to KG Morshed and Zuleikha Morshed. He completed his undergraduate studies from University of Oxford in 1956 and masters in law from Harvard Law School in 1958.

== Career ==
Morshed joined foreign service branch of Pakistan Civil Service in 1957.

In 1970, Morshed was the councilor at the Embassy of Pakistan in Australia.

After the independence of Bangladesh in 1971, Morshed served as the Deputy High Commissioner for Bangladesh to Australia from 1971 to 1972. He was the Director General of subcontinental affairs in the Ministry of Foreign Affairs from July 1972 to October 1976. He was the ambassador of Bangladesh to Brazil from October 1976 to April 1979.

From May 1979 to July 1982, Morshed was the ambassador of Bangladesh to West Germany. He was the Permanent Representative of Bangladesh to the United Nations Office at Geneva from 1982 to 1984. From 1984 to 1986, he was the secretary of state at the Ministry of Foreign Affairs. He was the ambassador of Bangladesh to West Germany from 1986 to 1988.

Morshed was the foreign secretary of Bangladesh from 25 June 1989 to 21 October 1989. After retiring he served the chairman of Bangladesh Institute of Peace and Security Studies from 1989 to 1997.

== Personal life ==
Morshed was married Suraiya Morshed. Their daughter, Lamiya Morshed, is the executive director of Yunus Centre of Muhammad Yunus.

== Death ==
Morshed died on 23 November 2023 in United Hospital, Dhaka, Bangladesh.
