= Karl P. Sauvant =

Academic legal and trade specialist

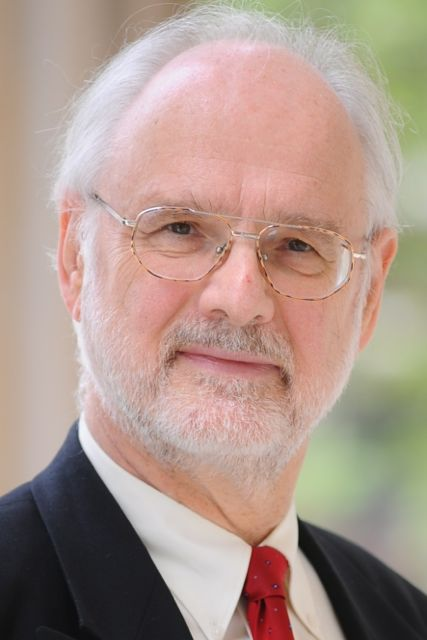

Academic background
- Education: University of Pennsylvania (PhD), University of Pennsylvania (MA), Freie Universität Berlin (BA)
- Influences: John H. Dunning, Peter Hansen, Howard W. Perlmutter, Jeffrey D. Sachs, Raymond Vernon

Academic work
- Discipline: Foreign Direct Investment, International Business, Development, International Political Economy
- Institutions: Columbia University, New York; United Nations (UNCTAD), Geneva
- Notable ideas: World Investment Report; established what became the Columbia Center on Sustainable Investment; proposed the CONNEX Support Unit, an Advisory Centre on International Investment Law, and the WTO Investment Facilitation for Development Agreement
- Website: https://www.karlsauvant.com

Karl P. Sauvant (born 1944) is Senior Fellow at the Columbia Center on Sustainable Investment (CCSI), and Lecturer in Law at the Center for International Commercial and Investment Arbitration, Columbia University, New York City. He was also Lecturer in Law at Columbia Law School between 2006 and 2023 and Co-director of the Millennium Cities Initiative (2006-2011). He was Director of the Investment and Enterprise Division at the United Nations Conference on Trade and Development (UNCTAD) from 2001 to 2005, where, before that, he also served for many years as Chief of the research section. In January 2006, Sauvant established with the support of Jeffrey D. Sachs the Columbia Center on Sustainable Investment. He served as its Executive Director until February 2012.

Sauvant is an expert in the field of foreign direct investment (FDI) and multinational enterprises, working on policies that increase the development benefits of FDI flows. He is known for a number of international initiatives and contributions to FDI research and policy. In 1991, as Chief of the Research Section of the United Nations Centre on Transnational Corporations (UNCTC), he created the World Investment Report, a prestigious annual report on FDI and development published by the United Nations, and was its team leader and lead author until 2004; the World Investment Report received, in 2020, the Academy of International Business Presidential Recognition Award, to “honor[ed] the 30th anniversary of the World Investment Report (WIR) and its contribution to the field of international business”. He was founder and Editor-in-Chief of the Columbia FDI Perspectives (November 2008-November 2025, for 422 Perspectives), was co-founder and co-editor of the United Nations Transnational Corporations journal, and was founder and editor of the Yearbook on International Investment Law & Policy (2008-2012). He co-edited the documents of the Non-Aligned Countries (with Odette Jankowitsch—12 volumes) and the documents of the Group of 77 (with Joachim Müller—20 volumes) in what amounts to archives of the documents issued by these two groups of countries for the years involved. He also co-edited the Annual Review of United Nations Affairs (1991-1994 together with Kumiko Matsuura and Joachim Müller; 2005-2021 together with Joachim Müller—118 volumes); ARUNA contains the principal documents for the five key UN organs, with latter editions also providing in-depth commentaries on principal developments in these organs during each UN year. He has published extensively in scholarly publications and books in the fields of foreign direct investment and development, international investment law and policy, and international political economy.

Sauvant has initiated and championed several important policy initiatives, including a proposal for an international support program to facilitate sustainable investment which, thanks to Abdel-Hamid Mamdouh, was taken forward in the World Trade Organization, where it led to the conclusion of the Investment Facilitation for Development Agreement in February 2024; the Agreement awaits integration into the WTO rulebook. As senior international advisor, he worked (primarily with the International Trade Centre) to support the negotiations of the Agreement by helping to strengthen the capacity of developing countries to participate in, and benefit from, the negotiations of that Agreement. He championed, during 2011-2016 together with Peter Eigen, the establishment of CONNEX (Contract Negotiation Support), a facility assisting developing countries in negotiating better investment contracts, especially in extractive industries infrastructure and renewable energy; thanks to Günter Nooke, the proposal was put on the G7 agenda in 2014, under the name of CONNEX, and was implemented by Germany in 2017, when it established the CONNEX Support Unit in Berlin, where Sauvant serves as the Co-Chair of the Advisory Committee. He has also advocated for the establishment of an Advisory Centre on International Investment Law. The proposal was taken forward in the United Nations Commission on International Trade Law (UNCITRAL) by Anna Joubin-Bret, Secretary of that Commission, which adopted, in principle and by consensus, the statute for an Advisory Centre on International Investment Dispute Resolution in July 2024.

Sauvant is a Fellow of the Academy of International Business and was awarded a Distinguished Honorary Fellowship of the European International Business Academy.

== Education ==
Sauvant completed his Ph.D. (1975) and M.A. (1969) in International Relations from the University of Pennsylvania, and his B.A. equivalent in Political Science from the Free University of Berlin.

== Publications ==
=== Selected works ===
- Sauvant, Karl P. (2023). “How Would a Future WTO Agreement on Investment Facilitation for Development Encourage Sustainable FDI Flows, and How Could It be Further Strengthened?” in Elora Neto Godry Farias, Gino Rivas, Gustavo Favero Vaughn, and Mateo Verdías Mezzera, with Kabir Duggal (eds.), Pro Arbitration’ Revisited: A Tribute to Professor George Bermann from His Students Over the Years. Huntington: JURIS, 2023, pp. 15–32.
- Berger, Axel; Kagan, Yardenne; Sauvant, Karl P., eds. (2022). Investment Facilitation for Development: A Toolkit for Policymakers. Second edition. International Trade Centre. SSRN 3830031.
- Sauvant, Karl P.; Gabor, Evan (2021). Facilitating Sustainable FDI for Sustainable Development in a WTO Investment Facilitation Framework: Four Concrete Proposals, Journal of World Trade, vol. 55, pp. 261-286. SSRN 3496967.
- Sauvant, Karl P. (2021). Improving the Distribution of FDI Benefits: The Need for Policy-oriented Research, Advice and Advocacy, Journal of International Business Policy, vol. 4, pp. 244–261. SSRN 3818974.
- Sauvant, Karl P.; Ortino, Federico (2017). Improving the International Investment Law and Policy Regime: Options for the Future. Ministry for Foreign Affairs of Finland. ISBN 978-952-281-217-9. SSRN 2896922.
- Sauvant, Karl P. (ed.). Yearbook on International Investment Law & Policy. Oxford University Press., various years.
- Sauvant, Karl P.; Alvarez, José Enrique (2011). "International Investment Law in Transition (Introduction)". In Alvarez, José Enrique; Sauvant, Karl P.; with Ahmed, Kamil Gerard; Vizcaino, Gabriela (eds.). The Evolving International Investment Regime: Expectations, Realities, Options. New York: Oxford University Press. ISBN 9780199793624.
- Messerlin, Patrick A.; Sauvant, Karl P., eds. (1990). The Uruguay Round: Services in the World Economy. Washington and New York: The World Bank and the United Nations Centre on Transnational Corporations. ISBN 978-0821313749.
- Sauvant, Karl P. (1986). International Transactions in Services: The Politics of Transborder Data Flows. Boulder: Westview Press. ISBN 978-0367006402.
- Sauvant, Karl P. (1981). The Group of 77: Evolution, Structure, Organization. Dobbs Ferry: Oceana. ISBN 978-0379009644.
- Sauvant, Karl P., ed. (1981). Changing Priorities on the International Agenda: The New International Economic Order. Oxford: Pergamon. ISBN 978-0080268064.
