= Lamiya Morshed =

Bangladeshi social development leader

- লামিয়া মোর্শেদ
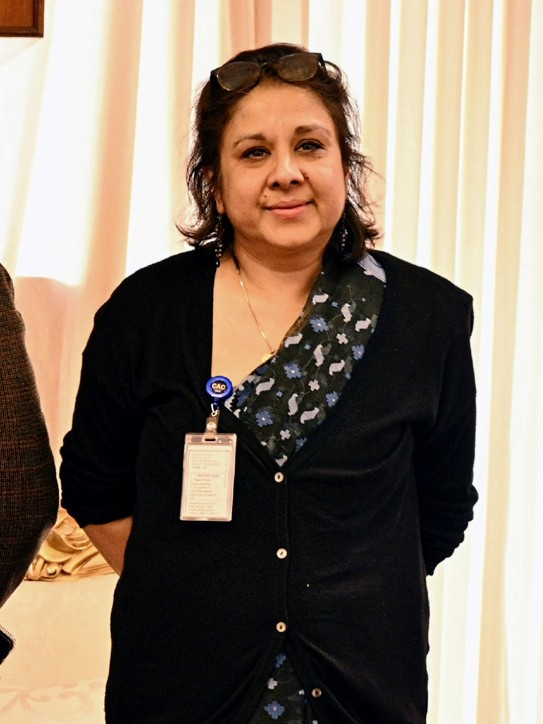
- Lamiya in 2025

Executive Director of Yunus Centre
- Incumbent
- Assumed office July 2008
- Chairman: Muhammad Yunus
- Preceded by: Office established

Principal Coordinator for Sustainable Development Goals Affairs
- In office 14 August 2024 – 17 February 2026
- Chief Adviser: Muhammad Yunus

Personal details
- Parents: Ali Kaiser Hasan Morshed (father); Suraiya Morshed (mother)
- Education: London School of Economics
- Known for: Microcredit; Social business

Lamiya Morshed is a Bangladeshi social development professional, known for her work in the fields of microcredit and social business. On 14 August 2024, she was appointed as the principal coordinator for Sustainable Development Goals (SDGs) at the Chief Adviser's Office in Bangladesh.

== Early life ==
Lamiya was born to Ali Kaiser Hasan Morshed and Suraiya Morshed. Her father was a Bangladeshi diplomat. Lamiya graduated from the London School of Economics.

== Career ==
Morshed began her career with the Grameen Trust in 1994. In her role, she contributed to the development and implementation of microcredit programs across various countries.

She also serves as the executive director of the Yunus Centre, the global hub for social business, where she has been instrumental in organizing global summits and promoting social business initiatives. Additionally, Morshed is the managing director of Grameen Healthcare Trust.

On 14 August 2024, she was appointed as the principal coordinator for SDGs at the Chief Adviser's Office of Bangladesh. In this role, she is tasked with coordinating efforts to achieve the Sustainable Development Goals in Bangladesh, collaborating with various stakeholders to align national strategies with global development objectives.

=== Board memberships and other roles ===
Morshed holds several board memberships, including positions at Grameen Healthcare Services Ltd., Grameen Creative Lab, Grameen Intel, and Grameen Uniqlo. She is also involved with Yunus Social Business in Albania.
