= Paul Beamish =

Canadian social scientist

Paul Beamish is a Canadian social scientist, currently a Canada Research Chair at University of Western Ontario.

Beamish in 2013 received the prestigious Hellmuth Prize for Achievement in Research.

In 2021 Beamish was the winner Outstanding Contribution to the Case Method Award.

In 2022 Beamish received the John H. Dunning Academy of International Business (AIB) President’s Award.
