= Business Analysis and Valuation =

Business Analysis and Valuation Using Financial Statements: Text and Cases
- First edition (1996)
- Author: Krishna Palepu; Paul M. Healy
- Genre: Business, accounting
- Publisher: Cengage
- Publication date: 2012 (5th edition); 2007 (4th edition); 2003 (3rd edition); 2000 (2nd edition); 1996 (1st edition)
- Media type: Print
- Pages: 984 (4th edition)
- ISBN: 978-0-324-30286-8
- Followed by: Winning in Emerging Markets (Palepu)

Business Analysis and Valuation Using Financial Statements: Text and Cases is a textbook by Krishna Palepu and Paul Healy, which is widely used in worldwide MBA programs and finance courses. It is in its 5th edition, and also has an IFRS edition. The fifth edition was released August 2012. The book won the Notable Contribution to the Accounting Literature Award for impact on academic research. It also won the American Accounting Association’s Wildman Award for its impact on management practice. It has been translated into Chinese, Japanese, and Spanish. The book is sold with a business analysis and valuation software model published by the Harvard Business School Publishing Company.

== Authors ==
Krishna Palepu is the Ross Graham Walker Professor of Business Administration at Harvard Business School. He also serves as Senior Adviser to the President of Harvard University for Global Strategy.

Paul Healy is the James R. Williston Professor of Business Administration and Senior Associate Dean for Research at Harvard Business School.
