= Palepu =

Palepu may refer to:

- 17970 Palepu, a main belt asteroid
- Krishna G. Palepu, Ross Graham Walker Professor of business administration and Senior Associate Dean for international development
