= Ernest Anthony Lowe =

British economist

Ernest Anthony (Tony) Lowe (June 1928 - 5 March 2014) was a British economist, and Professor of Accounting and Financial Management at the University of Sheffield, known for his work on management control, and management control systems.

== Biography ==
Lowe started his career as chartered accountant and received his BSc in Economics at the London School of Economics.

In the beginning of his academic career he held appointments at the Durham University, the University of Leeds, the Massachusetts Institute of Technology, Harvard University and the University of California, Berkeley, and back in England mid-1960s at the University of Bradford, and then as senior lecturer in management accounting at Manchester Business School. In 1971 Lowe was appointed Professor of Accountancy and Financial Administration, and later Professor of Accounting and Financial Management at the University of Sheffield, where he held the university's first chair in accounting.

From 1997 to 2012 he was director of the Management Control Association.

== Work ==
=== Management control systems ===
Lowe was one of the first authors to define management control systems. In his 1972 article "On the idea of a management control system" he listed the following four reasons for the need for a planning and control system:

The need for a planning and control system within a business organization flows from certain general characteristics of the nature of business enterprises, the chief of which are follows:
- firstly, the enterprise has (by definition) organizational objectives, as distinct from the separable and individual ones of the members constituting the 'managerial coalition';
- Secondly, the managers of the sub-units of the enterprise must necessarily be ambivalent in view of their own personal goals, as well as have a good deal of discretion in deciding how they should behave and in formulating their part of any overall plan to achieve organizational objectives;
- thirdly, business situations (and people's behaviour) are full of uncertainty, internally as well as externally to the business enterprise.
- fourthly, there is a necessity to economize, in human endeavours we are invariably concerned with an allocation of effort and resources so as to achieve a given set of objectives...

The term ‘management control’ was given of its current connotations by Robert N. Anthony (Otley, 1994).

=== Reception ===
David Cooper (2014) recounted

Tony Lowe's publications are important contributions to the intellectual beginnings of critical accounting and a fitting memorial to his recent death. This... [started with] Tony's conceptualization of management control as a system...

Rob Gray (2014) added:

[Lowe was] possibly the most important academic the field of accounting has ever produced... He was absolutely crucial in the development of wider perspectives on accounting drawing equally from economic, sociology, decision theory, systems science and operations research to set in motion the accounting we know these days as interpretative and critical. His influence on modern management accounting is incalculable. More generally, I have always been in awe of his creation of the ‘Sheffield School’ and his critical influence on its principal members such as Wai Fong Chua, David Cooper, Richard Laughlin, Tony Puxty, Tony Tinker, Prem Sikka, Dick Wilson...

== Selected publications ==
Lowe, Tony, Tony Puxty, and Wai Fong Chua, eds. Critical perspectives in management control. Macmillan Press, 1989.

Articles, a selection:

- Lowe, E. A., and Richard Wright Shaw. "An analysis of managerial biasing: Evidence from a company's budgeting process." Journal of Management Studies 5.3 (1968): 304-315.
- Lowe, E. A. "On the idea of a management control system: integrating accounting and management control." Journal of management Studies 8.1 (1971): 1-12. (abstract)
- Lowe, E. A., and J. M. McInnes. "Control in Socio- Economic Organizations: A Rationale for the Design of Management Control Systems. "Journal of Management Studies 8: 2 1 (1971): 3-27. (abstract).
- Lowe, E. A., and A. M. Tinker. "Siting the accounting problematic: towards an intellectual emancipation of accounting." Journal of Business Finance & Accounting 4.3 (1977): 263-276.
- Lowe, E. Anthony, Anthony G. Puxty, and R. C. Laughlin. "Simple theories for complex processes: accounting policy and the market for myopia." Journal of Accounting and Public Policy 2.1 (1983): 19-42.
- Berry, A. J., Capps, T., Cooper, D., Ferguson, P., Hopper, T., & Lowe, E. A. (1985). "Management control in an area of the NCB: rationales of accounting practices in a public enterprise." Accounting, Organizations and Society, 10(1), 3-28.
- Laughlin, Richard, and E. A. Lowe. "A critical analysis of accounting thought: prognosis and prospects for understanding and changing accounting systems design." Critical Accounts, Macmillan, London (1990): 15-43.
