= Boris Groysberg =

American academic (born 1971)

- Born: 4 December 1971 (age 54)
- Education: New York University; Harvard Business School
- Employer: Harvard Business School

Boris Groysberg (born December 4, 1971) is an American academic. He is the Richard P. Chapman Professor of Business Administration at Harvard Business School.

== Early life ==
Boris Groysberg was born on December 4, 1971. He graduated from New York University in 1994. He earned a DBA from the Harvard Business School in 2002.

== Career ==
Groysberg began his career at IBM. He later became the Richard P. Chapman Professor of Business Administration at the Harvard Business School.

Groysberg is the author of a book and co-author of two more books. His first book, Chasing Stars: The Myth of Talent and the Portability of Performance, is an analysis of the portability of star talent among investment bankers in New York City. In a review for the Administrative Science Quarterly, Alison Davis-Blake concluded that the book "combines the excitement of peeking inside the daily world of Wall Street investment bankers with careful statistical analyses and rich qualitative data to encourage the reader to think more deeply about whether hiring stars creates or destroys value for both stars and the firms that employ them." Reviewing it for Perspectives on Work, Matthew Bidwell noted that the book made an important contribution to the literature on HR systems and mobility, and he praised the "combination of quantitative and qualitative material", concluding that "The reader comes away with a deep understanding of what investment analysts do, how those analysts relate to others, how they are managed, and how they and firms think about careers."

== Selected works ==
- Groysberg, Boris (2012). Chasing Stars: The Myth of Talent and the Portability of Performance. Princeton, New Jersey: Princeton University Press. ISBN 9780691154510. OCLC 943038029.
- Groysberg, Boris; Slind, Michael (2012). Talk, Inc. How Trusted Leaders Use Conversation to Power Their Organizations. Boston, Massachusetts: Harvard Business Review Press. ISBN 9781422173336. OCLC 916474705.
- Groysberg, Boris; Healy, Paul M. (2013). Wall Street Research: Past, Present, and Future. Palo Alto, California: Stanford University Press. ISBN 9780804785310. OCLC 911177948.
