= Billions of Entrepreneurs =

2008 book by Tarun Khanna

Billions of Entrepreneurs: How China and India Are Reshaping Their Futures—and Yours
- Author: Tarun Khanna
- Language: English
- Genre: Business
- Published: January 21, 2008 Harvard Business School Press
- Publication place: United States
- Pages: 352
- ISBN: 9781422103838
- OCLC: 487066860

Billions of Entrepreneurs is a book by Harvard Business School professor, Tarun Khanna. It was published in 2008 by Harvard Business School Press.

The book provides an analysis of China and India, and explains how these two emerging Asian economies are reshaping the global economy in the 21st century.

== Brief summary ==
The book's central thesis is the fact that Chinese and Indian firms are developing, growing, and expanding to match or surpass their western competitors, the book is divided into three sections, all of which cover the past, present, and future of said firms. The book focuses on case studies and on social problems, difficulties and successes. Examples of this are of the following: linking rural traders to the internet via P2P networking, a non-profit devoted to helping and educating women and attaining financial security for rural women, a state-of-the-art hospital that covers all of your medical expenses, General Electrics Asian operations, Chinese Banks and a history of Chinese Banking under the CCP. The book also covers themes of Indian-Chinese Mutualism, relative western ignorance or American ignorance of other cultures, and of corruption, negligence, and poverty at the hands of government officials.

== See also ==
- Tarun Khanna
