= Management accounting in supply chains =

Management accounting in supply chains (or supply chain controlling, SCC) is part of the supply chain management concept. This necessitates planning, monitoring, management and information about logistics and manufacturing processes throughout the value chain. The goal of management accounting in supply chains is to optimise these processes. This strategy focuses on supporting management.

== Overview ==
As value chains have become more complex due to globalization, supply chain management (SCM) has become increasingly relevant in theory and practice. SCM encompasses extensive management-control tasks. This range of subjects is summarized by the definition of supply-chain controlling. The transfer of existing management control systems (MCM) to the SCM is insufficient because these primarily aim at internal (company) needs. Beyond past-oriented, financial figures there must also be future-oriented measurement; a number of approaches exist in the literature.

== Definition ==
Supply-chain management has become increasingly relevant in theory and practice in light of more-complex supply chains. The SCM performs extensive operational tasks, including supply-chain controlling. Stefan Seuring adapts the three main concepts of German supply chain-controlling literature into the specific demands of SCM:

Supply-chain controlling concept
Criteria	Rationality-oriented	Coordination-oriented	Information-oriented
Specific problem	Ensuring rationality of supply-chain management	Assuring and maintaining coordination and flexibility in supply chain management	Decision-related information
Direct controlling objective	Balancing task-related and staff-related bottlenecks	System building and coordination of planning and control and providing information throughout the supply chain	Implementing of supply-chain-wide information systems Providing problem-specific information to all participants in the supply chain
Indirect controlling objective	Performance-objective system	Profit (efficiency, short- and long-term profit)	Profit and liquidity objectives

The rationality-oriented approach of supply-chain controlling coordinates all participants in the supply chain to improve performance. Common management systems and instruments for performance measurement are developed, enabling guidance for individual companies and the entire supply chain. The coordination-oriented approach supports the supply-chain leadership. Organizational objectives include the selection of strategic partners, the distribution of tasks among companies, process management and ensuring the provision of information to all participants. The information-oriented supply-chain controlling concept emphasizes providing partners with relevant information for decision-making. An efficient reporting structure must be implemented, including strategic and operative organizations in the system and their technical aspects.

== Requirements ==
A requirement for the supply chain is the support of cooperating companies, ensuring future cooperation; companies must focus on common tools and targets. For this, an understanding of processes within the participating companies is indispensable. Information exchange (including sensitive data) within a supply chain is necessary to ensure its control, with coordination among in-house information systems. The requirements for management accounting in supply chains are significantly higher than the provision of key figures, but this is a fundamental task.

== Tasks and functions ==
The tasks and functions of controlling may be transferred to management accounting in supply chains, supplemented by a cross-company approach. However, the past-oriented aspects of the traditional concept are inappropriate. Due to the strategic importance of supply-chain management, forward-looking control requirements must be taken into account. Because of the complexity of a supply chain, a focus on interface management is necessary. In the literature, several tasks and functions are defined. Management accounting in supply chains has the following features:

- Planning
- Monitoring and control
- Information supply
- Coordination
- Rationality and reflection

== Aims ==
Because of different controlling directions, in management accounting of supply chains different aims are pursued and influence each other. Again, the challenge is the cross-company factor. Independent companies must agree on a common strategy for the SCM and define common aims. Two types of aims exist: direct and indirect.

=== Direct ===
Direct aims relate to the support of SCM and controlling. This ensures logistical processes between parties in a supply chain or the introduction of a common performance-measurement system for verification of lead times.

=== Indirect ===
Company-wide, generalized aims may be pursued with management accounting in supply chains. Examples are competitiveness, expanding cooperation, growth, market development and greater customer orientation.

== Instruments ==
Management accounting in supply chains draws on modified traditional instruments of managerial accounting to accomplish cross-company objectives. There are two measuring instruments: the supply-chain map and the supply-chain operations reference (SCOR).

=== Supply-chain scorecard ===
The basic model of the balanced scorecard (BSC) was introduced by Kaplan and Norton in 1992. The BSC aims to achieve a balance between non-financial and financial measures. To use the scorecard in a cross-company context, several modifications of content and structure are necessary. The BSC consists of four generic perspectives, which are geared to the individual company. According to this, a generally accepted framework does not exist. From a common strategy, the supply-chain scorecard (SCS) maps cross-company measures. Brewer and Speh note that focusing on the supply chain requires four perspectives:

- Financial benefits
- Supply chain-management (SCM) goals
- SCM improvement
- End customer benefits

Independent of perspective, each should include internal and cross-company measures.

=== Cross-company activity-based costing ===
Activity-based costing is a model to assign indirect costs into direct ones. To use this model in the context of supply chains, there must be consistent defined and delimited cost and performance data. Since many companies participate in more than one supply chain, standardization across the sector is beneficial. Compatibility of information technology is important for improved data transfer, so manual entry is limited and high availability guaranteed. Several changes result from cross-company activity-based costing:

- Determination of supply-chain efficiency (aggregate of cost and performance data)
- Detailed cost analysis (for decisions)
- Process benchmarking between supply-chain members
- Realization of target costs

=== Supply-chain performance-measurement system ===
A primary task of management accounting in supply chains is performance measurement. The key elements of strategic goals include the measurement of resources, output and flexibility. Efficient resource management is critical to profitability; without an acceptable output, customers will turn to other supply chains. In a changing environment, supply chains must adapt. Measures for resource performance include total costs, distribution costs, manufacturing costs, measures of inventory and rate of return. Examples of performance measures are numbers of items produced, time required to produce, customer satisfaction and product quality (which is difficult to express numerically). Reductions in back orders, increased customer satisfaction and the ability to accommodate demand variations are advantages associated with flexibility.

== See also ==
- Supply chain
- Supply chain management
- Management control system
