= Grameen Fund =

Indian not-for-profit company

Grameen Fund (GF)
- Type: Private
- Industry: Finance
- Founded: 17 January 1983; 43 years ago in Bangladesh
- Headquarters: Dhaka, Bangladesh
- Area served: Bangladesh
- Key people: Muhammad Yunus, chairman of the board of Grameen Fund and managing director, Grameen Bank
- Products: Financial services: Mobile Telephony; Digital Service Venture capital
- Revenue: ▲24,420,213.00 BDT (2005)
- Total assets: 210,067,085.00 BDT (2005)
- Number of employees: 25 (2005)
- Website: grameen.com/grameen/gfund/index.html

Grameen Fund is a not-for-profit company in Bangladesh established by Muhammad Yunus to provide risk capital to small and medium enterprises (SME) beyond the scope of Grameen Bank's objectives of providing microcredit to the very poor. Incorporated on 17 January 1994, Grameen Fund started operation in February 1994, inheriting 40 projects of Grameen bank with assets of 391 million Bangladeshi taka investmented in small industries, fisheries and agriculture. Its lending capital is provided by Grameen Bank and other institutions like Calvert Foundation. From the first Calvert Foundation investment, approximately 6,000 permanent jobs have been created or maintained in agriculture, engineering, poultry, dairy, fishery, and handicrafts sectors.

As of 2007, it invested equity worth $1.0 million in 13 joint ventures and financed 1763 small and micro enterprises in Bangladesh, especially in technology-oriented industries, by providing collateral-free fixed and working capital loans. It has provided capital loans to other Grameen family organisations including Grameen Motsho, Grameen Krishi Foundation, Grameen Uddog, Grameen Babsha Sheba Limited, Polli Dushtha Bio Centre, Gonoshasthya Grameen Textile and Grameen Securities Management Limited. Till 30 August 2006, it disbursed taka 135.5 to 1257 projects in the Grameen Bank network. During the fiscal year 2006, 219 loans were made for a total of US$362,174, including 216 microenterprise loans and 3 small business loans. Of the micro enterprises, 21 was for minority-owned businesses, and 3 for women-owned businesses.

Its stated objective is to create a mechanism to support untested business that shows promises of good return or employment generation by filling in the venture capital gap. The four programs of the Fund are – Venture/ Equity Financing Scheme, Micro Enterprise Loan Scheme, Loan Financing, and Time Deposit Loan Scheme.

== Equity projects ==
Grameen Fund runs a number of ventures as private entrepreneurships, including Grameen Capital Management Limited, Grameen CyberNet Limited (GCL), Grameen Bitek Limited, Grameen Solutions Limited (previously known as Grameen Software), Grameen IT Park Limited (also known as DataEdge), Grameen Star Education Limited (which started Grameen-Daffodil IT Education Limited, Grameen Knitwear Limited, GlobeKids Digital Limited, and Rafiq Autovan Manufacturing Industries Limited.

=== Grameen Mutual Fund One ===
Grameen Mutual Fund One is a team-managed all-weather closed-end balanced mutual fund enlisted at Dhaka and Chittagong Stock Exchanges. Grameen Fund is the sponsor and trustee of the fund, while Standard Chartered Bank is the custodian and Asset & Investment Management Services of Bangladesh Limited (AIMS) is the asset manager.

=== Grameen CyberNet ===
Grameen CyberNet Limited is an internet content, solution and service provider in Gulshan, Dhaka, Bangladesh founded in July 1996 by Dr. Muhammad Yunus and Golam Mohiuddin, an entrepreneur promoting Apple Inc. in Bangladesh, as a joint venture between Grameen Fund, the venture capital arm of Grameen Bank, and CITech Limited, Mohiuddin's enterprise. As of August 2007, it provided a full suite of cost-effective business class network services, designed to meet the high communication service standards and evolving needs of large business to over 30,000 clients in various sectors.

=== Grameen Knitwear ===
Grameen Knitwear Limited was established as an export-oriented composite knitwear factory, in the Export Processing Zone in Savar, Dhaka. It has knitting, dyeing, finishing and garments production facilities.

== See also ==
- Grameen family of organisations
