= Priyank Narayan =

Indian academic

Academic background
- Education: Indian Institute of Technology, Delhi (PhD)

Academic work
- Institutions: Ashoka University; Cambridge Judge Business School

Priyank Narayan is an Indian academic and author. He is an associate professor of entrepreneurial practice at Ashoka University, where he is the founding director of the InfoEdge Centre for Entrepreneurship. He is the co-author of Leapfrog: Six Practices to Thrive at Work (2022) and LeanSpark: Frugal by Design, Global in Impact (2026).

== Education ==
Narayan earned a Bachelor's degree in India before completing an MBA at the Asian Institute of Management in Manila. He holds a PhD from the Department of Management Studies at the Indian Institute of Technology Delhi. Additionally, he has completed executive education programs at Harvard Business School and Singularity University.

== Academic career ==
Before entering academia, Narayan worked at International Business Machines Corporation and founded his startup. In 2014, he was awarded the IBM Global Faculty Award. Narayan joined Ashoka University as the founding director of the InfoEdge Centre for Entrepreneurship. His work there focuses on startup incubation and the development of interdisciplinary business curricula. He has held visiting or guest faculty positions at the IIM-A, HEC Paris, and the University of Cambridge's Judge Business School. His research interests include frugal innovation and entrepreneurial ecosystems.

== Literary work and reception ==
His first book, Leapfrog: Six Practices to Thrive at Work (2022), co-authored with Mukesh Sud, discusses professional development strategies and was reviewed by The Hindu Business Line and Moneycontrol.

His 2026 work, LeanSpark: Frugal by Design, Global in Impact, co-authored with Jaideep Prabhu and Mukesh Sud, examines scalable frugal innovation. It has been reviewed by The Financial Express, Livemint, and Business Today.

Narayan has also co-authored management case studies published by IIM Ahmedabad and Harvard Business Publishing Case, including a study on the founding of Ashoka University. He is a contributor to Indian national news dailies on the subjects of entrepreneurship and business education.
