= Management control system =

Higher level management tasks conglomerate

A management control system (MCS) is a system which gathers and uses information to evaluate the performance of different organizational resources like human, physical, financial and also the organization as a whole in light of the organizational strategies pursued.

Management control system influences the behavior of organizational resources to implement organizational strategies. Management control system might be formal or informal.

== Overview ==
Management control systems are tools to aid management for steering an organization toward its strategic objectives and competitive advantage. Management controls are only one of the tools which managers use in implementing desired strategies. However strategies get implemented through management controls, organizational structure, human resources management and culture.

According to Simons (1995), management control systems are the formal, information-based routines and procedures managers use to maintain or alter patterns in organizational activities

Anthony & Young (1999) showed management control system as a black box. The term black box is used to describe an operation whose exact nature cannot be observed.

== History ==
One of the first authors to define management control systems was Ernest Anthony Lowe, Professor of Accounting and Financial Management at the University of Sheffield, in his 1971 article "On the idea of a management control system." He listed the following four reasons for the need for a planning and control system:

The need for a planning and control system within a business organization flows from certain general characteristics of the nature of business enterprises, the chief of which are follows:
- firstly, the enterprise has (by definition) organizational objectives, as distinct from the separable and individual ones of the members constituting the 'managerial coalition';
- Secondly, the managers of the sub-units of the enterprise must necessarily be ambivalent in view of their own personal goals, as well as have a good deal of discretion in deciding how they should behave and in formulating their part of any overall plan to achieve organizational objectives;
- thirdly, business situations (and people's behaviour) are full of uncertainty, internally as well as externally to the business enterprise.
- fourthly, there is a necessity to economize, in human endeavours we are invariably concerned with an allocation of effort and resources so as to achieve a given set of objectives...

The term ‘management control’ was given of its current connotations by Robert N. Anthony (Otley, 1994).

== Management control system, topics ==
=== Management control ===
According to Maciariello et al. (1994), management control is concerned with coordination, resource allocation, motivation, and performance measurement. The practice of management control and the design of management control systems draws upon a number of academic disciplines.

- Management control involves extensive measurement and it is therefore related to and requires contributions from accounting especially management accounting.
- Second, it involves resource allocation decisions and is therefore related to and requires contribution from economics especially managerial economics.
- Third, it involves communication, and motivation which means it is related to and must draw contributions from social psychology especially organizational behavior (see Exhibit#1).

[Anthony and Govindajaran] (2007) defined Management Control as the process by which managers influence other members of the organization to implement the organization’s strategies. According to Kaplan, management controls are exercised on the basis of information received by the managers.

=== Management accounting and management accounting system ===
Anthony & Young (1999) showed that management accounting has three major subdivisions:

- full cost accounting,
- differential accounting and
- management control or responsibility accounting.

Chenhall (2003) mentioned that the terms management accounting (MA), management accounting systems (MAS), management control systems (MCS), and organizational controls (OC) are sometimes used interchangeably.

In this case, management accounting refers to a collection of practices such as budgeting, product costing or incentives. Organizational controls are sometimes used to refer to controls built into activities and processes such as statistical quality control, just-in-time management.

=== Finance-oriented vs. operational-oriented management control ===
Traditionally, most measures used in management control systems are accounting-based and financial in nature. This emphasis on financial measures, however, distracts from essential non-financial factors such as customer satisfaction, product quality, etc. Furthermore, non-financial measures are better predictors of long-run performance.

Consequently, a management control system should include a comprehensive set of performance aspects consisting of both financial and non-financial metrics. The inclusion of non-financial measures has become an essential characteristic of current management control systems, to the point of becoming the main criterion in distinguishing different systems.

Therefore, depending on the balance between financial and non-financial measures, a management control system may be characterized as finance-oriented or operations-oriented. Finance-oriented control systems are primarily based on financial accounting data, such as costs, earnings or profitability, whereas operations-oriented control systems are primarily based on non-financial data that focus on operational output and quality, for example service volume, employee turnover, or customer complaints.

== Management control system techniques ==
According to Horngren et al. (2005), management control system is an integrated technique for collecting and using information to motivate employee behavior and to evaluate performance. Management control systems use many techniques such as

- Activity-based costing
- Balanced scorecard
- Benchmarking and benchtrending
- Budgeting
- Capital budgeting
- Just-in-time manufacturing (JIT)
- Kaizen (continuous improvement)
- Program management techniques
- Target costing
- Total quality management (TQM)
- Incentive system

Contemporary challenges to management control systems are systematised by Lambovska and Angelova-Stanimirova in.

== See also ==
- Management
- Control (management)
- Health management system
- Management accounting in supply chains
