= Tarun Khanna (academic) =

Indian-born American academic, author and economic strategist

- Born: 1968 (age 57–58); India
- Citizenship: American
- Education: B.S (Electrical Engineering & Computer Science); Ph.D. (Business Economics)
- Alma mater: Princeton University; Harvard University
- Occupations: Author, economic strategist, professor
- Board member of: AES Corporation; SKS Microfinance; Aragen Life Sciences; TVS Logistics
- Website: www.tarunkhanna.org

Tarun Khanna (born 1968) is an Indian-born American academic, author, and an economic strategist. He is currently the Jorge Paulo Lemann professor at Harvard Business School; where he is a member of the strategy group, and the director of Harvard University’s South Asia initiative since 2010.

He joined the HBS faculty in 1993, after obtaining a B.S. degree in electrical engineering and computer science from Princeton University (1988) and a Ph.D. in business economics from Harvard Business School (1993). His areas of interests include diasporas, economic development, emerging markets, globalization, international business, and strategy.

Khanna has authored several scholarly works, articles and books; with the most notable being, his 2008 book – Billions of Entrepreneurs: How China and India are Reshaping Their Futures and Yours, and 2010 co-authored book – Winning in Emerging Markets: A Roadmap for Strategy and Execution.

In 2007, he was nominated to be a young global leader (under 40) by the World Economic Forum; and in 2009, elected as a fellow of the Academy of International Business. Khanna also sits on the boards of AES Corporation, SKS Microfinance, Aragen Life Sciences and TVS Logistics.

== Early life and education ==
Khanna was born in India, in 1966. After schooling in Bombay and Bangalore, he moved to the United States to pursue his higher education. In 1984 he enrolled for a B.S. degree program with a major in electrical engineering and computer science from Princeton University, which he completed in 1988, summa cum laude, Phi Beta Kappa. He then turned to business studies and economics; and earned a Ph.D. in business economics from Harvard Business School in 1993.

== Career ==
=== Academic career : 1993 to present ===
After earning his PhD, and an interim stint on Wall Street, Khanna joined the HBS faculty in 1993 as an associate professor of business administration, and later in 1998 became professor and a Novartis fellow. In May 2004, he was appointed Jorge Paulo Lemann professor of economics. Since then he has dedicated his academic schedule to studying and working with multinational and indigenous companies, and investors, in emerging markets worldwide.

He has served as the course head of the required 'strategy course' in the Harvard MBA program; and has chaired the executive education program on strategy, leadership, and governance. He is the director of Harvard University's South Asia initiative since 2010, and also the faculty chair for HBS activities in India. Currently, he teaches in Harvard's comprehensive general management executive education programs. Khanna has been a prominent interviewer in the Creating Emerging Markets project, designed to facilitate research and teaching on the business history of emerging markets, which includes interviews with long-time leaders of firms and NGOs in Latin America, South Asia, Turkey and Africa.

His areas of interests include diasporas, economic development, emerging markets, globalization, international business, and strategy.

=== Other work ===
In 2014 Khanna co-founded Axilor Ventures, a venture capital network for young entrepreneurs. He is also co-founder of Aspire Institute.

== Bibliography ==
Dr. Khanna’s scholarly works and articles have been published in a number of economics and management journals. He also authored / co authored books on topics – drivers of entrepreneurship in China and India, and how to approach and be successful in emerging markets. A selection of his books and articles, are the following;

- Books (author)
  - Khanna, Tarun (1990). Foundations of Neural Networks. Addison-Wesley. ISBN 9780201500363.
  - Khanna, Tarun (2008). Billions of Entrepreneurs: How China and India Are Reshaping Their Futures--and Yours. Harvard Business School Press. ISBN 9781422103838.
  - Palepu, Krishna; Khanna, Tarun (2010). Winning in Emerging Markets: A Road Map for Strategy and Execution. Harvard Business School Press. ISBN 9781422166956.
  - Khanna, Tarun (2018). Trust: Creating the Foundation for Entrepreneurship in Developing Countries. Berrett-Koehler Publishers. ISBN 9781523094837.
- Articles
  - Huang, Yasheng; Khanna, Tarun (July 2003). "Can India Overtake China?". Foreign policy.
  - Palepu, Krishna; Khanna, Tarun (October 2006). "Emerging Giants: Building World-Class Companies in Developing Countries". Harvard Business Review.
  - Khanna, Tarun (December 2007). "China + India: The Power of Two". Harvard Business Review.
  - Khanna, Tarun (June 2011). "Reshaping Indian Higher Education". Harvard Business Review.

== Boards and honors ==
Khanna sits on the boards of the global power company, AES Corporation, and SKS Microfinance, a major micro finance company in India. He also sits on the boards of Aragen Life Sciences, a leading CRO and TVS Logistics.

In 2007, he was nominated to be a young global leader (under 40) by the World Economic Forum; and in 2009, elected as a fellow of the Academy of International Business

== Personal life ==
He is married; and resides in Newton, Massachusetts with his wife, daughter and son.
