= Partners Harvard Medical International =

Partners HealthCare International
- Type: Non-Profit
- Industry: Health Care
- Founded: 1994; 32 years ago
- Headquarters: Boston, Massachusetts, United States
- Key people: President: Christopher Coburn; Executive Director: Raymond Liu, MD, FSIR
- Website: international.partners.org

Partners HealthCare International (PHI) provides advisory services and professional consulting to organizations outside the United States. PHI is a subsidiary of Partners HealthCare System, a non-profit health care system based in Boston, Massachusetts.

== History ==
PHI was founded in 1994 as a subsidiary of Harvard University. From 1994 until 2008, the organization was known as Harvard Medical International, or HMI. Operated as a division of Harvard Medical School, HMI's original focus was to work with institutions around the world — primarily medical schools and health care delivery organizations — interested in developing education programs and health care programs with the help of Harvard professors and the staff of Harvard Medical School. In April 2008, HMI became Partners Harvard Medical International and became part of Partners HealthCare. Since 1994, the company has developed collaborative relationships with institutions in more than 40 countries.

== Organization ==
PHI's clients are primarily health care organizations or systems, academic medical institutions or other schools in the health sciences, government and non-governmental agencies, and others groups that develop health care and education projects. PHMI helps clients with strategic planning, infrastructure, facilities, and systems planning, clinical and educational program design, professional development programming, and quality improvement programs. Many PHMI projects involve work in a variety of areas of expertise and draw on collaboration between the staffs of PHI and its clients. PHI works with members of the Harvard University faculty and clinical staff from Harvard-affiliated hospitals in the Boston area, including Massachusetts General Hospital and Brigham & Women's Hospital, who consult on its projects.

PHI's early work focused on helping medical schools research and implement up-to-date curriculum models. PHI has relationships with medical faculties at Alfaisal University in Riyadh, Saudi Arabia, and LMU Munich and the Dresden University of Technology in Germany. Other long-standing relationships include PHMI's work with Asan Medical Center in Seoul, South Korea, and Tokyo Medical and Dental University in Japan.

During the last decade, PHI has worked on an increasing number of projects focused on developing health care delivery systems and organizations. In 2003, PHMI began working with Dubai Healthcare City (DHCC), the large health care and education free zone development supported by the Government of Dubai. PHI helped design the rules and regulations for the health care city and the processes DHCC used to bring in new health care services providers.

Another PHI project is its collaboration with Wockhardt Hospitals Limited, a private sector chain of super-specialty hospitals based in Mumbai, India. In 2005, after PHMI and Wockhardt together designed a quality and performance improvement program, Wockhardt's Mulund hospital received accreditation from Joint Commission International (JCI). Further work led to JCI's accreditation of Wockhardt's Bangalore hospital in 2008.

Recent projects have focused on improving diabetes care in Libya, helping develop of a new medical school in Saudi Arabia, and conceptual planning for schools of nursing, medicine, and allied health in Pakistan. PHI has also partnered with Vitals Global Healthcare, which is entrusted to develop new facilities in Malta, under a PPP initiative estimated at 200 million Euro to introduce new medical facilities on the island.

PHI has around 20 full-time employees based in its Boston headquarters. A number of full-time staff are on the faculty of Harvard Medical School and have served in different roles at Harvard-affiliated hospitals in the Boston area. Its staff has expertise in nursing, architecture and facilities planning, and management consulting.

== See also ==
- Partners HealthCare
- Brigham and Women's Hospital
- Massachusetts General Hospital
- Harvard Medical School
