= Robert N. Anthony =

American academic (1916-2006)

- Born: September 6, 1916; Orange, Massachusetts
- Died: December 1, 2006 (aged 90)
- Education: Colby College; Harvard University
- Occupation: Academic

Robert Newton Anthony (September 6, 1916 – December 1, 2006) was an American organizational theorist, and professor of management control at Harvard Business School, known for his work in the field of management control systems.

== Biography ==
Born in Orange, Massachusetts to Charles H. and Grace Newton Anthony in 1916, Anthony skipped a grade in elementary school and attended high school in Haverhill, Massachusetts. There he played the saxophone in the school band, and graduated in 1933 at the age of 16. In 1938 Anthony graduated from Colby College, and in 1942 received his master's degree in business administration from Harvard, and in 1952 his Doctor of Commercial Science degree.

Anthony was a Harvard Business School faculty member from 1940 to 1982. In 1942 he became research assistant to Ross G. Walker (1891–1970), Harvard Professor of Business Administration since 1936. After his service in the US Navy from 1943 to 1946 he returned to Harvard, where he was appointed full professor in 1956. In 1965 he took another leave of absence from Harvard to serve as the Under Secretary of Defense under his friend, Defense Secretary Robert McNamara. In 1973 and 1974, he was president of the American Accounting Association.

== Work ==
=== Planning and management control ===
Harvard Business School professor Regina Herzlinger explained about the impact of Anthony's work in the 2006 obituary in the Harvard Gazette:

Bob Anthony took a field that was something that only accountants did and transformed it into one that informed top managers in the planning and control of their organizations... He had a monumental impact not only on his students, through his teaching and textbooks, but also on the business, nonprofit, and government worlds through his many influential articles and powerful personal demeanor - his knowledge, intellectual clarity, sense of duty and honor, and managerial perspective.

And furthermore:

Bob was also a marvelous writer. He made the murky subject of accounting clear. These exceptional qualities of mind and character, coupled with a Yankee work ethic, helped him to transform the field of managerial accounting from the province of accountants to the tool of managers.

And Harvard accounting professor Charles Christenson added:

Bob did more than anyone else to introduce a conceptual structure to management control. In his numerous publications, he has ranged across all the important questions. 'Management Control in Industry Research Organizations,' for example, examined the problem of measuring intellectual output - a much more difficult task than measuring more tangible output. His 1965 book, 'Planning and Control Systems,' became the bible of the field.

Robert N. Anthony was the one who said that "Accounting principles should be based on the premise that the most important characteristics of financial information is its usefulness for decision making." He introduced the concept of decision making as a basis for management control.

=== Comptroller at the US Department of Defense ===
In 1965 Anthony served as comptroller at the US Department of Defense under Robert S. McNamara, where he supervised the quality of accounting and financial reporting of the organization. Antony was credited for aligning the accounting service among the five military services. Charles Christenson explained:

He changed the way the Defense Department operated... There was a substantial cost overrun on the Minuteman missile program. Secretary McNamara wanted procedures to keep that from happening again. Bob made sure all the branches were on the same wavelength.

== Selected publications ==
Anthony wrote or had a role in writing 27 books on accounting and management control. A selection:

- Anthony, Robert Newton. Planning and control systems: a framework for analysis. (1965).
- Anthony, Robert Newton, and James S. Reece. Management accounting: text and cases. Irwin, 1970.
- Anthony, Robert Newton, Glenn A. Welsch, and James S. Reece. Fundamentals of management accounting. RD Irwin, 1974.
- Anthony, Robert Newton, John Dearden, and Norton M. Bedford. Management control systems. RD Irwin, 1980.
- Anderson, Charles A., and Robert Newton Anthony. The new corporate directors: Insights for board members and executives. Wiley, 1986.
- Anthony, Robert Newton, and David W. Young. Management control in nonprofit organizations. Vol. 4. Homewood, IL: Irwin, 1988.
- Anthony, Robert Newton. The management control function. Boston: Harvard Business School Press, 1988.

== Archives and records ==
- Robert N. Anthony papers at Baker Library Special Collections, Harvard Business School
