= Grameen University =

Private university in Dhaka, Bangladesh

- গ্রামীণ ইউনিভার্সিটি
- Crest of Grameen University
- Other name: GrameenU
- Motto: Dedicated to creating the world of three zeros
- Type: Private, Research
- Established: March 18, 2025; 18 months ago
- Founder: Muhammad Yunus
- Accreditation: UGC; IEB
- Chairman: Ashraful Hassan
- Chancellor: President Mirza Fakhrul Islam Alamgir
- Location: 06, Main Road, Diabari South, Turag, Uttara, Dhaka, Bangladesh
- Campus: Urban
- Language: English
- Colors
- Website: grameenu.ac

Grameen University (Bengali: গ্রামীণ ইউনিভার্সিটি; GrameenU) is a proposed private university in Dhaka, Bangladesh. It was established in 2025 under the Private University Act, 2010 established by Grameen Trust.

== History ==
Grameen University was recognized by the University Grants Commission of Bangladesh on 18 March 2025. The Ministry of Education issued the approval letter on the same date.

== Campus ==
The campus is located in South Diabari, Turag, Uttara, Dhaka, Bangladesh.

== Administration ==
The institution will operate under Grameen Trust, founded by Professor Muhammad Yunus. Mohammad Ashraful Hassan, the current chief of Grameen Trust, will serve as the chairman of the university’s Board of Trustees.

== Academics ==
Academic activities have not started yet, but the faculties and departments that are scheduled to open are:

=== School of Business ===
- Bachelor of Business Administration (BBA)
- Master of Business Administration (MBA)

=== School of Engineering ===
- Bachelor of Science in Computer Science and Engineering (CSE)
- Bachelor of Science in Electrical and Electronic Engineering (EEE)
- Bachelor of Science in Data Science and Machine Learning Techniques
- Bachelor of Science in Health Science and Technology

=== School of Humanities & Social Sciences ===
- Bachelor of Arts in English

=== School of Sciences ===
- Bachelor of Pharmacy
- Bachelor of Science in Healthcare Management
- Bachelor of Science in Molecular Biology
- Bachelor of Science in Physics and Chemistry

=== School of Social Business ===
- Bachelor of Science in Social Business Management
- Bachelor of Arts in Entrepreneurship
- Master of Microfinance

== See also ==
- Education in Bangladesh
- Universities in Bangladesh
- List of universities in Bangladesh
- Grameen Bank
