= Management and Organization Review =

- Discipline: Management
- Language: English
- Edited by: Arie Y. Lewin

Publication details
- History: 2005-present
- Publisher: Cambridge University Press on behalf of the International Association for Chinese Management Research
- Frequency: Quarterly
- Impact factor: 3.6 (2022)

Standard abbreviations
- ISO 4: Manag. Organ. Rev.

Indexing
- ISSN: 1740-8776 (print); 1740-8784 (web)
- LCCN: 2005211366
- OCLC no.: 56392067

Links
- Journal homepage; Online access; Online archive

Management and Organization Review is a quarterly peer-reviewed academic journal published by Cambridge University Press on behalf of the International Association for Chinese Management Research. It covers research on international, comparative, and cross-cultural management in a Chinese context. The editor-in-chief is Arie Y. Lewin (Duke University).

== Abstracting and indexing ==
Management and Organization Review is abstracted and indexed in the Social Sciences Citation Index, Scopus, ProQuest, and EBSCO databases. According to the ISI Journal Citation Reports , the journal has a 2021 impact factor of 3.776, ranking it 137th out of 226 journals in the category "Management".

== Young Scholar Award ==
In 2008 Management and Organization Review established the Young Scholar Award, which is awarded once every two years to one author who has recently published in the journal, and received their degree no more than five years prior to their article's publication. Winners receive a 12-month membership to the International Association for Chinese Management Research and $2,000 prize money.
