= Paul M. Healy =

American academic

- Education: Victoria University of Wellington; University of Rochester
- Employer: Harvard Business School

Paul M. Healy is an American academic. He is the James R. Williston Professor of Business Administration at Harvard Business School.

== Early life ==
Paul M. Healy graduated from the Victoria University of Wellington in 1977. He earned a PhD from the University of Rochester in 1981.

== Career ==
Healy was a professor at the MIT Sloan School of Management. Since 1998, he has been a professor at the Harvard Business School. He was HBS's second highest paid professor in 2014, when he earned $606,618.

Healy is the co-author of several books.

== Selected works ==
- Groysberg, Boris; Healy, Paul M. (2013). Wall Street Research: Past, Present, and Future. Palo Alto, California: Stanford University Press. ISBN 9780804785310. OCLC 911177948.
- Palepu, Krishna G.; Healy, Paul M.; Peek, Eric (2016). Business Analysis and Valuation. Andover, Massachusetts: Cengage Learning. ISBN 9781473722651. OCLC 953133786.
