= Grameen family of organizations =

Grameen Bank and sister companies

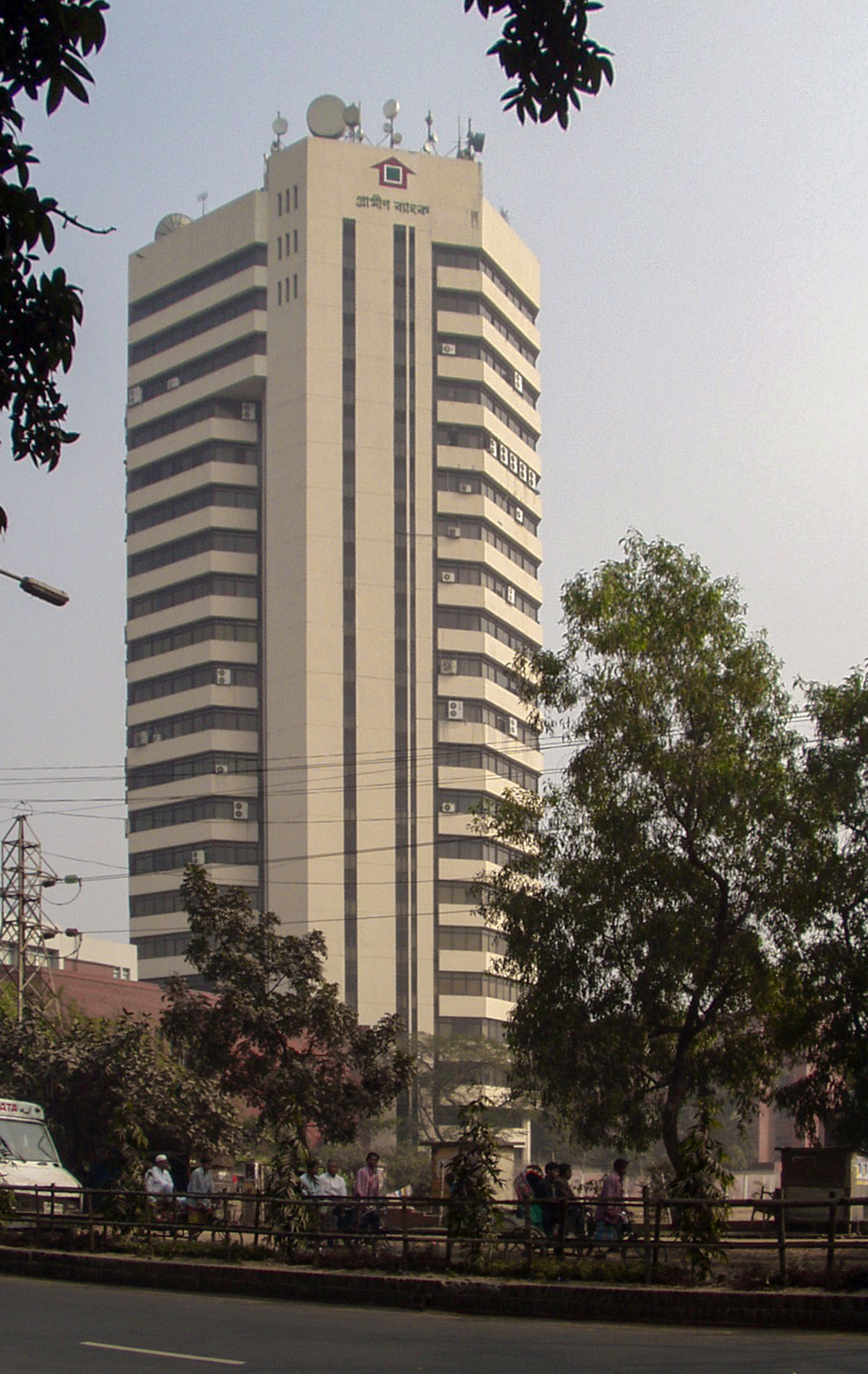
Grameen Bank Complex at Mirpur-2, Dhaka

The Grameen family of organizations has grown beyond Grameen Bank into a multi-faceted group of both commercial and non-profit ventures. It was first established by Muhammad Yunus, the Nobel Peace Prize-winning founder of Grameen Bank. Most of the organizations in the Grameen group have central offices at the Grameen Bank Complex in Mirpur, Dhaka, Bangladesh. The Grameen Bank started to diversify in the late 1980s when it began attending to unutilized or underutilized fishing ponds, as well as irrigation pumps like deep tubewells. In 1989, these diversified interests started growing into separate organizations, as the fisheries project became Grameen Fisheries Foundation and the irrigation project became Grameen Krishi Foundation.

These ventures include the Social Advancement Fund (SAF), Grameen Trust, Grameen Telecom Trust, Grameen Fund, Grameen Communications, Grameen Shakti (Grameen Energy), Grameen Telecom, Grameen Distribution Limited (GDL), Grameen Shikkha (Grameen Education), Grameen Mothsho Foundation, Grameen Krishi Foundation, Grameen Baybosa Bikash (Grameen Business Development), Grameenphone, Grameen Software Limited, Grameen CyberNet Limited, Gonoshasthaya Grameen Textile Mills Limited, Grameen Capital Management Limited, Grameen Knitwear Limited, Grameen Mutual Fund One, Grameen Kalyan (Grameen Well-being), Grameen Shamogree (Grameen Products), Grameen Danone Foods (joint venture with Groupe Danone) and Grameen Uddog (Grameen Enterprise, owner of brand Grameen Check).

Following Muhammad Yunus's appointment as chief adviser to Bangladesh's interim government in August 2024, several organisations affiliated with the Grameen family of organizations—including Grameen Bank and other Grameen entities—received a series of official approvals and regulatory benefits, prompting public scrutiny and criticism. Among the developments were the approval of Grameen University, the issuance of a manpower export licence to Grameen Employment Services Limited, and a digital wallet licence for a Grameen Telecom concern. Additionally, the government stake in Grameen Bank was reduced from 25% to 10%, and its five-year tax exemption was reinstated. Critics, including jurists and civil society members, raised concerns about potential conflicts of interest and the integrity of the approval processes, especially as several legal cases against Yunus and his associates were dismissed soon after he assumed office. While the interim government maintained that all approvals followed due process, transparency advocates called for greater disclosure to mitigate perceptions of undue influence.

== Grameen organizations ==
=== Grameen Bank ===
The Grameen Bank is a microfinance organization and community development bank started in Bangladesh that makes small loans (known as microcredit) to the impoverished without requiring collateral. The system is based on the idea that the poor have skills that are underutilized. The bank also accepts deposits, provides other services, and runs several development-oriented businesses including fabric, telephone and energy companies. The organization and its founder, Muhammad Yunus, were jointly awarded the Nobel Peace Prize in 2006.

=== Grameen Trust ===
Grameen Trust (GT), a non-profit and non-government organization established in 1989 uses microcredit as a tool for fighting poverty and follows the Grameen Bank approach for the purpose. It supports and promotes poverty focused microcredit programs all over the world under its Grameen Bank Replication Program (GBRP) through a number of ways - dialogue programs for potential replicators, training and technical assistance to replication projects, funding selected projects, and monitoring performance. Grameen Trust funds are provided in two forms - seed capital and scaling up fund.

As of August 2007, it has provided support to 138 replication partners in 37 countries of the world. Under the Build, Operate and Transfer (BOT) program, the Trust directly implements the projects to respond to the need for immediate and rapid implementation of poverty focused microfinance programs. Grameen Trust hosts the Grameen Global Network (GGN) and publishes the Grameen Dialogue newsletter to promote the cause of microcredit movement. To implement the replication program, it received funds from the MacArthur Foundation, United Nations Capital Development Fund (UNCDF), Deutsche Gesellschaft für Technische Zusammenarbeit (German Technical Cooperation or GTZ), United States Agency for International Development (USAID), United Nations High Commissioner for Refugees (UNHCR), United Nations Office for Project Services (UNOPS), the Citigroup Foundation, the World Bank and Ford Foundation.

=== Grameen Fund ===
Grameen Fund is a not-for-profit company in Bangladesh established to provide risk capital to small and medium enterprises (SME) beyond the scope of Grameen Bank's objectives of providing microcredit to the very poor. Incorporated on 17 January 1994, Grameen Fund started operation in February 1994, inheriting 40 projects of Grameen bank with assets of 391 million Bangladeshi taka investments in small industries, fisheries and agriculture. As of 2007, it invested equity worth $1.0 million in 13 joint ventures and financed 1763 small and micro enterprises in Bangladesh, especially in technology-oriented industries, by providing collateral-free fixed and working capital loans.

=== Grameen Telecom ===
Grameen Telecom (GTC) is a not-for-profit company in Bangladesh established with a partial stake in Grameen Phone (GP). GTC has driven the pioneering GP program of Village Phone that enables rural poor to own a cell-phone and turn it into a profit making venture. The vision behind the village phone program was formulated by Iqbal Quadir who was convinced that a mobile phone could become a source of income generation. Quadir worked with Professor Yunus and the Norwegian company Telenor to make the program a reality. Currently Grameen Telecom provides mobile phones among the villagers of the country.

=== Grameenphone ===
Grameenphone is ]-based cellular operator in Bangladesh and market leader with more than 50% of the Bangladeshi market share. Grameenphone started operations on 26th March, 1997. It is partly owned by Telenor (62%) and Grameen Telecom (38%). It has more than 10 million customers as of December 2006. It is also the fastest growing cellular telephone network in Bangladesh. At the end of 2005, it had about 3500 base stations around the country with plans to add about 500 in the following six months. Grameenphone's stated goal is to provide cost-effective and quality cellular services in Bangladesh.

=== Grameen Distribution Limited ===
Grameen Distribution Limited (GDL) is a local mobile manufacturing company in Bangladesh that began its journey in 2009. It is a social business-oriented company.

In 2019, GDL became the first in Bangladesh to launch semi knocked down (SKD) mobile manufacturing facilities. As of July 2025, around 200,000 units of various phone models are being produced each month at the factory. GDL's annual production capacity stands at approximately 3 million feature phones and 1.2 million smartphones. Additionally, the company has a network of more than 600 authorized dealers, over 14,000 retail outlets, 28 collection points and 36 service centers across the country.

=== Grameen Solutions Limited ===
Grameen Solutions Limited (GSL) is a software development company.

=== Grameen Communications ===
Grameen Communications (GC) is a not-for-profit information technology company established in Bangladesh in 1997, with a portfolio that includes software products and services, internet services, hardware & networking services and IT education. The life of the company began as an IT support unit under Grameen Trust in 1994. Besides providing IT support to various Grameen family organizations it in charge of developing systems for organizations like CASHPOR Financial and Technical Services Private Limited (CFTS) in Mirzapur District, Uttar Pradesh, India, CMC in UIndia, Swayam Krishi Sangham (SKS) in Hyderabad, India, Grameen Koota in Bangalore, India, Moris Rasik in East Timor, Ganesha Foundation in Jakarta, Indonesia, and Ahon sa Hirap Inc. (ASHI) in Manila, Philippines.

The company has developed the Village Computer and Internet Program (VCIP) to set up a number of multipurpose Cyber Kiosks in rural areas using different connectivity solutions for information access, communication and IT education. The first VCIP was established in a room rented from the Grameen bank at Madhupur Upazila, which is connected through microwave link to the VSAT at Grameen Communications office 160 km away in Dhaka. Two others were established at Sarishabari Upazila and Mirzapur Upazila. A partner of International Development Research Centre (IDRC) initiative Pan Asia Networking (PAN), GC is also developing a program with Digital Divide Data of United States to provide data entry jobs for rural Bangladeshis.

=== Grameen Fisheries and Livestock Foundation ===
Grameen Fisheries and Livestock Foundation or Grameen Motsho O Pashusampad Foundation (GMPF), a non-profit organization, was founded as Grameen Fisheries Foundation or Grameen Motsho Foundation (GMF), in February 1994 to mitigate poverty through aquaculture & fisheries, as well as an integrated fish-crop-livestock and dairy development farming system. The mandates of the organization are to provide rural landless poor, especially women, to gain access to common resource properties; replace exploitation with community empowerment; replace stagnation with social and economic growth; replace traditions with modernity; provide women with legal and gender rights; and to provide food security and sustainable livelihood.

=== Grameen Shakti ===
Grameen Shakti (GS) is a renewable energy social enterprise established in 1996 to promote, develop and popularize renewable energy technologies in remote, rural areas of Bangladesh. It is a part of the Grameen family founded to take the Grameen Bank objective of alleviating poverty for the extreme poor through microcredit. Grameen Shakti into one of the largest and fastest-growing renewable energy companies in the world. GS trained its engineers to be 'social engineers' who go from door-to-door to demonstrate the effectiveness of renewable energy. GS trained local youth as technicians to ensure that people would have efficient and free after-sales service right on their doorstep.

Grameen Shakti is the leading company on renewable energy in Bangladesh. As of December 2010 Grameen Shakti has installed 25MWp solar system. Beside these, Grameen Shakti have installed solar mobile charging van, Solar lighting Boat, Solar emergency Lighting, Solar water Purifier, solar power telecom systems, Off grid power supply system and also nowadays they are encouraging urban people to use hybrid solar- National grid system with low price.

In 2007, Grameen Shakti was honoured with a Right Livelihood Award for "bringing sustainable light and power to thousands of Bangladeshi villages, promoting health, education and productivity." He has also won two Ashden Awards, in 2006 and 2008.

=== Grameen Shikkha ===
Grameen Shikkha or Grameen Education was established in 1997 to promote mass education in rural areas, provide financial support in the form of loans and grants for the purpose of education, use IT for alleviation of illiteracy and development of education, promote new technologies and innovate ideas and methods for development of education. Additionally, it runs the Arsenic Mitigation Program, the Pre-school/Child Development Program, the Life the Focused Education Program, and the Early Childhood Development Program.

=== Grameen Byabosa Bikash ===
Grameen Byabosa Bikash (GBB) or Grameen Business Promotion and Services was established in 1994 as a social business and not-for-profit organization to provide supplementary services on top of microcredit to rural entrepreneurs dealing in products like vegetables, livestock or handicrafts to provide experience, skill and knowledge.

=== Grameen Danone Foods ===
Grameen Danone Foods was launched in 2006 as a joint venture between Grameen Bank and the French food company Groupe Danone. Grameen Danone's first product is a fortified yoghurt, branded Shoktidoi, which is designed to provide children with many of the key nutrients that are typically missing from their diet in rural Bangladesh.

=== Grameen America ===
Grameen America is a microfinance organization. Grameen America provides loans, savings programs, credit establishment and other financial services to the working poor, especially women, in the United States.

=== Grameen Foundation USA ===
The Grameen Foundation USA works to replicate the Grameen Bank model of microfinance around the world through a network of partner microfinance institutions.

=== Grameen University ===
Grameen University is a private university in Bangladesh. It is affiliated to the University Grants Commission.
