= Ross G. Walker =

American organizational theorist, consultant and Professor of Business Administration

Ross Graham Walker (August 31, 1891 – December 1, 1970) was an American organizational theorist, consultant, and Professor of Business Administration at Harvard Business School, known for his seminal work in the field of management control systems.

== Biography ==
Born in Athens, Michigan in 1891, Walker obtained his BA in economics from the University of Michigan in 1920, and his MA in economics from Harvard University in 1938.

Walker started his academic career in 1920 teaching economics at the University of Michigan. In 1922 he moved to the University of Iowa, where he was appointed professor of commerce. In 1926 he moved to the Harvard Business School, where he became Professor of Business Administration in 1936. Between 1931 and 1936 Walker had taken a leave of absence from Harvard to serve as treasurer of the Hamilton Woolen Company. During his years at Harvard Walker also worked as consultant for many companies in the industry.

== Selected publications ==
- Anthony, Robert Newton, and Ross Graham-Walker. A reference guide to essentials of accounting. Addison-Wesley, 1985.

Articles, a selection:

- Walker, Ross G. "The base-stock principle in income accounting." Harvard Business Review 15.1 (1936): 76-94.
- Walker, Ross G. "The misinformed employee." Harvard Business Review 26.3 (1948): 267-281.
- Walker, Ross G. "The Judgment Factor in Investment Decisions." Harvard Business Review 39.2 (1961): 93-99.

== Archives and records ==
- Ross G. Walker papers at Baker Library Special Collections, Harvard Business School.
