= Global strategy =

Global strategy as defined in business terms is an organization's strategic guide to globalization. Such a connected world, allows a business's revenue to not be to be confined by borders. A business can employ a global business strategy to reap the rewards of trading in a worldwide market.

== Description ==
A sound global strategy should address these questions: what must be (versus what is) the extent of market presence in the world's major markets? How to build the necessary global presence? What must be AND (versus what is) the optimal locations around the world for the various value chain activities? How to run global presence into a global competitive advantage? The “International” classification of a global business strategy is employed by companies who may sell in foreign markets, but their primary focus is on their home market. These companies may include international strategies in their business model to increase sales, but they know that their main target consumer is local.

== Research ==
Academic research on global strategy came during the 1980s, including work by Michael Porter and Christopher Bartlett & Sumantra Ghoshal. Among the forces perceived to bring about the globalization of competition were convergences in economic systems and technological change, especially in information technology, that facilitated and required the coordination of a multinational firm's strategy on a worldwide scale.

== Industries ==
A global strategy may be appropriate in industries where firms are faced with strong pressures for cost reduction but with weak pressures for local responsiveness. Therefore, it allows these firms to sell a standardized product worldwide. However, fixed costs (capital equipment) are substantial. Nevertheless, these firms are able to take advantage of scale economies and experience curve effects, because it is able to mass-produce a standard product, which can be exported (providing that demand is greater than the costs involved).

Global strategies require firms to tightly coordinate their product and pricing strategies across international markets and locations, and therefore firms that pursue a global strategy are typically highly centralized.

== Aspects ==
A global strategy involves thinking in an integrated way about all aspects of business-its suppliers, production sites, markets, and competition. It involves assessing every product or service from the perspective of both domestic and international market standards. It means embedding international perspectives in product formulations at the point of design, not as afterthoughts. It means meeting world standards even before seeking world markets and being world class even in local markets. It means deepening the company's understanding of local and cultural differences in order to become truly global.
