= Harvard Business Publishing =

United States publishing company

- Founded: 1994; 31 years ago
- Country of origin: United States
- Headquarters location: Brighton, Massachusetts
- Publication types: Magazines, Books, Case Studies
- Nonfiction topics: Leadership, Management, Business
- No. of employees: Over 600
- Official website: www.harvardbusinesspublishing.org

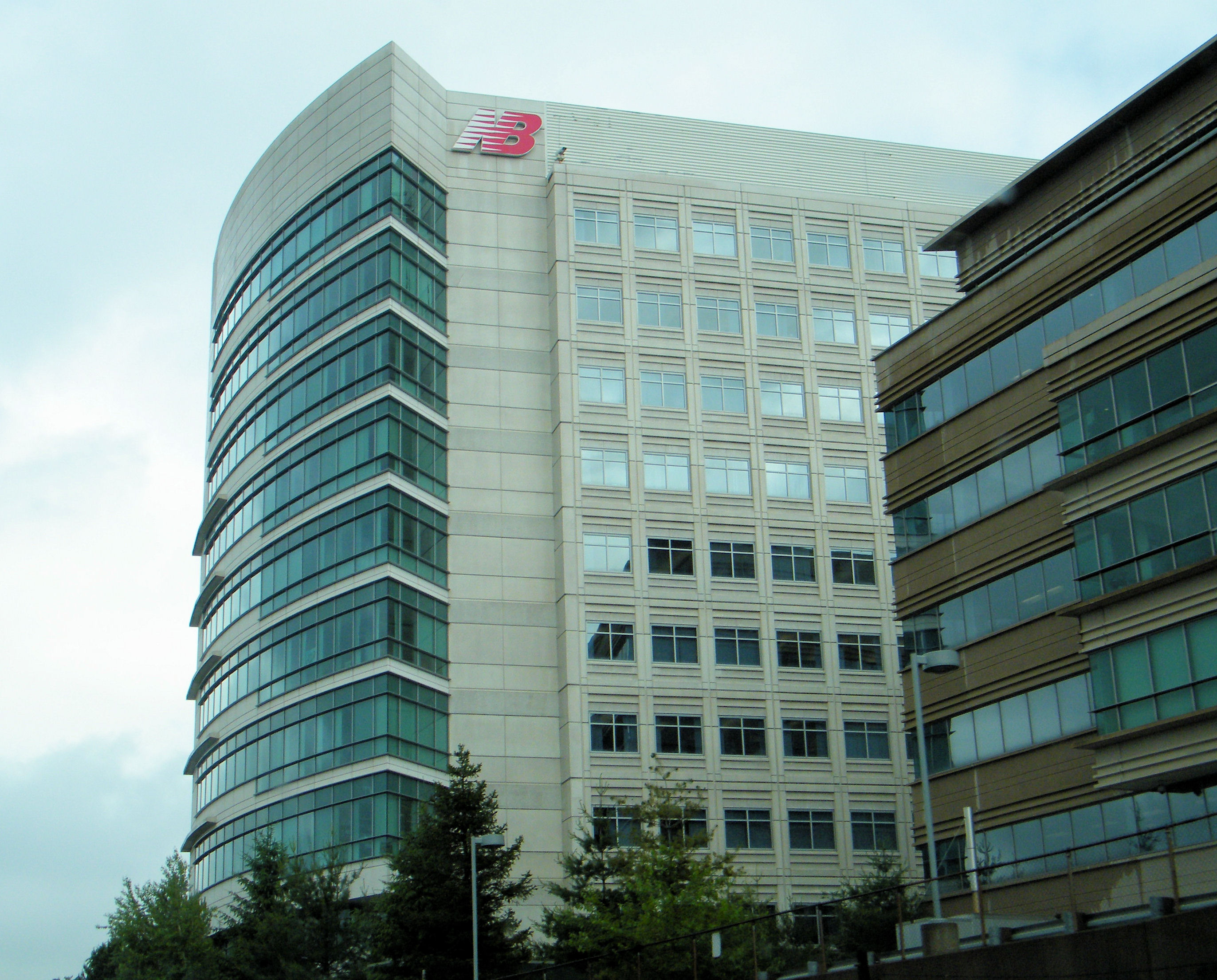
Harvard Business Publishing Headquarters, Formerly housed New Balance

Harvard Business Publishing (HBP) is a publisher founded in 1994 as a not-for-profit, independent corporation and an affiliate of Harvard Business School (distinct from Harvard University Press), with a focus on improving business management practices. The company offers articles, books, case studies, simulations, videos, learning programs, and digital tools to organizations and subscribers.

HBP consists of three market units: Education and Corporate Learning (under the Harvard Business Impact brand) and Harvard Business Review Group. Their offering consists of print and digital media (Harvard Business Review, Harvard Business Review Press books, Harvard Business School and other licensed cases), events, digital learning (Harvard ManageMentor, HMM Spark), blended learning, and campus experiences.
