= Journal of International Business Studies =

- Discipline: International business, management
- Language: English
- Edited by: Rosalie L. Tung

Publication details
- History: 1970–present
- Publisher: Palgrave Macmillan for the Academy of International Business
- Frequency: 9/year
- Open access: Hybrid
- Impact factor: 10.2 (2025)

Standard abbreviations
- ISO 4: J. Int. Bus. Stud.

Indexing
- ISSN: 0047-2506 (print); 1478-6990 (web)
- LCCN: 98657338
- JSTOR: 00472506
- OCLC no.: 1604487

Links
- Journal homepage; Online archive

The Journal of International Business Studies is a double blind peer-reviewed academic journal published by Palgrave Macmillan on behalf of the Academy of International Business covering research on international business.

The journal was established in 1970 and has become the highest ranked academic journal in the field of international business. For example, the journal holds the highest possible 4* ‘World Elite’ rating in the UK's Association of Business Schools’ Academic Journal Guide 2024 and the highest possible A* rating in Australia's ABDC Journal Quality List 2025.

The current editor-in-chief is Rosalie L. Tung (Simon Fraser University).

== Editors ==
The following persons are or have been editors-in-chief:

- 1970–1975: Ernest W. Ogram, Jr.
- 1975–1984: William A. Dymsza
- 1985–1992: David A. Ricks
- 1993–1997: Paul W. Beamish
- 1997–2002: Thomas L. Brewer
- 2002–2007: Arie Y. Lewin (Duke University)
- 2007–2010: Lorraine Eden (Texas A&M University)
- 2010–2016: John Cantwell (Rutgers University
- 2016–2022: Alain Verbeke (University of Calgary)
- 2023–present: Rosalie L. Tung (Simon Fraser University)

== JIBS Decade Award ==
The "JIBS Decade Award" was established in 1996 to recognize the most influential paper published in the volume a decade prior. The award is sponsored by Palgrave Macmillan. A selection committee evaluates the five most cited papers of the year and decides on the most influential paper. A special session is held at the Academy's annual conference including a presentation from the award winner and additional commentary. In 2009, the Decade Award was extended to include the 1970–1985 volumes of the journal.

== Abstracting and indexing ==
The journal is abstracted and indexed in:

- Current Contents/Business Collection
- Current Contents/Social and Behavioral Sciences
- EBSCO databases
- EconLit
- International Bibliography of the Social Sciences
- ProQuest databases
- Scopus
- Social Sciences Citation Index

According to the Journal Citation Reports, the journal has a 2025 impact factor of 10.2.
