= Academy of International Business =

Professional association

Academy of International Business (AIB)
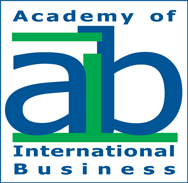
- The logo of AIB
- Abbreviation: AIB
- Formation: 1959
- Type: Professional body
- Legal status: Association
- Purpose: Educational
- Headquarters: East Lansing, Michigan, USA
- Members: 3400+ in 90 countries
- Main organ: Executive Board
- Website: https://www.aib.world/

Academy of International Business (AIB) is an association of international business scholars and specialists. Established in 1959, it has over 3400 members in about 90 countries. Membership is open to organizations as well as individuals.

== Publications ==
AIB publishes the Journal of International Business Studies (JIBS), the Journal of International Business Policy (JIBP), and the AIB Insights.

JIBS is a scholarly journal in the field of international business. Published since 1970, it is currently published nine times a year.

JIBP is the principal outlet for theoretical and empirical research in all areas of policy that relate to international business. Published since 2008, it is currently published four times a year. The journal announced in May 2021 its addition to Emerging Citation Sources Index (ECSI). It received its first impact factor in 2022 (2-year Impact Factor: 7.9).

AIB Insights is an open access journal and provides an outlet for short (around 2500 words), interesting, topical, current and thought-provoking articles. Articles can discuss theoretical, empirical, practical, or pedagogical issues affecting the international business community of researchers, practitioners, policy makers, and educators. It is currently published four times a year.

AIB also publishes an online newsletter and the proceedings of its annual conference.

== Conferences ==
The Annual Meeting of the Academy of International Business is held each year in late June or early July. The location of its annual meeting rotates amongst the continents.

- 2004 - Stockholm
- 2005 - Quebec City
- 2006 - Beijing
- 2007 - Indianapolis
- 2008 - Milan AIB celebrated its 50th anniversary.
- 2009 - San Diego
- 2010 - Rio de Janeiro
- 2011 - Nagoya
- 2012 - Washington, D.C.
- 2013 - Istanbul
- 2014 - Vancouver
- 2015 - Bangalore
- 2016 - New Orleans
- 2017 - Dubai
- 2018 - Minneapolis
- 2019 - Copenhagen
- 2020 - Virtual/Online
- 2021 - Virtual/Online
- 2022 - Miami
- 2023 - Warsaw
- 2024 - Seoul

== Chapters and Shared Interest Groups ==
AIB currently has 13 geographic chapters Each chapter organizes an annual regional conference and may also publish its own newsletter and conference proceedings.

In addition, AIB has 5 shared interest groups (SIGs), communities within the larger academy where members can focus on developing their work within a specific subject area or research methodology.
