= The Reading School of International Business =

The Reading School of International Business is a school of economic thought widely understood in the field of international business (IB), management and economics to embody a stream of conceptual, and theoretically driven empirical research related to enterprises. It consists of a group of economists that have a common approach to analyzing multinational enterprise and foreign direct investment. Some are based in the Department of Economics and in Henley Business School at the University of Reading, England, but membership is international.

The Reading School builds upon the pathbreaking theoretical work of Peter Buckley and Mark Casson on internalization theory. This was complemented by simultaneous work by John Dunning as he developed the eclectic paradigm of international business as an envelope explanation containing three principal drivers of foreign direct investment, comprising ownership (O); location (L); and internalization (I).

The Reading School approach continues through the work of its academic disciples around the world, as well as through The John Dunning Centre at Henley Business School, University of Reading, under the directorship of Rajneesh Narula.

== History and Growth ==
The term 'Reading School' was first identified in 1978 by the Japanese economist Kiyoshi Kojima (1920–2010), when he criticized the explanation of the post-war growth of multinational enterprises made by scholars at the University of Reading. Kojima argued that Western multinationals were monopolies that distorted the international allocation of resources rather than improved it. The Reading School, by contrast, emphasized the efficiency gains that multinational enterprises can generate in a world of imperfect markets. They argued that multinationals shared technologies between parent firms and subsidiaries, and between one subsidiary and another, thereby transferring technologies to countries that did not have the resources to develop them themselves.

The Reading School accepts that high-technology firms may possess a degree of monopoly power, but it argues, following Joseph Schumpeter, that monopoly profits can reward innovation. The Reading School approach argues that under certain conditions it is best for society to allow multinationals to decide for themselves whether to retain control of their technologies through foreign investment or to partner with local firms instead.

Internalization theory and the eclectic paradigm have been refined over the last 40 years to become the bedrock explanations of multinational enterprise activity. The founder members of the Reading School were John Harry Dunning (1926–2009), Peter Buckley, Mark Casson, Robert Pearce and John Cantwell. Dunning was Head of the Department of Economics at the University of Reading, 1964-87 (later Professor at Rutgers University, New Jersey), Buckley was Research Fellow at University of Reading in 1973-4 (later Professor at University of Bradford and University of Leeds), Casson was lecturer in economics (later Professor and Head of Department) at University of Reading, Pearce was Research Fellow (later Professor) at University of Reading and Cantwell was Research Fellow (later Professor) at University of Reading and then Rutgers University. Buckley and Casson promoted internalization theory, whilst the others promoted Dunning's eclectic paradigm. Cantwell later espoused an evolutionary resource-based view of multinationals, while simultaneously also contributing to the eclectic paradigm.

Aside from scholars based at University of Reading, visiting scholars in the 1970s and 1980s were instrumental in debating and refining the Reading School approach. Canadian economist Alan M. Rugman (1945–2014) visited in 1976/77 on sabbatical, and in subsequent years, Rugman became an influential exponent of the Reading School approach, extending internalization theory to address policy issues in business taxation and trade regulation. He returned to University of Reading in 2008 and was Head of International Business and Strategy in Henley Business School. Other notable visitors were Seev Hirsch, founding member of the Leon Recanati Graduate School of Business Administration at Tel Aviv University; Stephen Magee (University of Texas at Austin); David Teece, visiting in 1989, now at University of California, Berkeley; Thomas G. Parry, visiting in 1975; and Masahiko Itaki in the late 1980s. In 1988 the business historian Geoffrey Jones (academic) joined the economics department, and Reading School thinking began to influence business and economic history (Jones left in 2002 and is now Professor of Business History at Harvard Business School). Sarianna Lundan, a Ph.D. student of John Dunning at Rutgers University, joined University of Reading in the late 1990s before moving on to Maastricht University and then University of Bremen. Lundan, along with Dunning late in his career, continued to extend the Reading School approach to multinational enterprise.

== Further Contributions ==
A second area where Reading School theorists have made a significant impact has been the innovation and research and development performance of multinational enterprise. Major contributions have been made in this area by Robert Pearce, whose 1989 book was one of the first systematic analyses of the behaviour of the research and development activities of subsidiaries of multinational enterprise. In parallel, John Cantwell has integrated internalization theory with the economics of technological change and Schumpeterian and evolutionary economics. Rajneesh Narula and Simon Collinson have established conceptual linkages between multinational enterprise activities and their use of outsourcing alliances within national systems of innovation.

A third area of focus for the Reading School is how multinational enterprises affect economic development. Originally developed by Peter Buckley and John Dunning, this takes a macro-view of the interaction of multinational enterprise on structural change in countries. The first published paper by John Dunning proposed a framework that has become known as the investment development path. This proposed that there was a systematic relationship between development and the inward and outward activities of multinational enterprises. This was later extended by a number of collaborative contributions by Rajneesh Narula and John Dunning on FDI and government, and more recently on development and the multinational enterprise. There have been a number of parallel contributions by Nigel Driffield (Aston University), Sanjaya Lall (Oxford University), Hafiz Mirza UNCTAD, Rajah Rasiah (University of Malaya), Nagesh Kumar UNESCAP, Jeremy Clegg (University of Leeds), among others that have further built upon this theme. One of the core insights has been to better understand how learning by firms is motivated by the way in which foreign investors and domestic actors interact, and builds upon internalization theory and the eclectic paradigm. This theme is especially relevant to developing and transition economies, and has inspired a number of important policy studies.

== Policy Influence ==
The influence of the Reading School extends beyond its contributions to academic research, and into policy-making at the highest levels. This dates back to John Dunning's involvement with UNCTAD in 1968 in drafting a report on the extent and pattern of UK direct investment in less developed countries (LDCs). He was appointed in 1972 to the United Nations' Group of Eminent Persons to examine the role of multinational enterprise in economic development and international relations. Dunning acted as Senior Economic Advisor to the Secretary General of the United Nations from 1991 to 2006.

Dunning was instrumental in establishing the UN's annual flagship publication on multinational enterprise – the World Investment Report in 1991. This report has become one of the most important UN reports on multinational enterprise and development, and has become a primary reference point for most governments (now published by UNCTAD). Other members of the Reading School have been engaged in advisory and consultancy roles in writing these reports and preparing background materials, including Mark Casson, Rajneesh Narula and Robert Pearce. Similarly, the UNCTAD World Investment Directory represented an extension of the work of John Dunning and John Cantwell, The IRM Directory of Statistics of International Investment and Production, Macmillan, London and New York University Press, New York, 1987, 820pp.

== Alums and Proponents ==
Many graduates of the Ph.D. program at University of Reading carry on the tradition and approach of the Reading School: Birgitte Andersen (Big Innovation Centre, London), Jeremy Clegg (University of Leeds, UK), Mohamed Azzim Gulamhussen (ISCTE, Lisbon), Nigel Driffield (Warwick University, UK), Chie Iguchi (Kieo University, Tokyo), Odile Janne (Birkbeck, University of London, UK), Elena Kosmopoulou (University of Reading), Camilla Noonan (University College Dublin, Ireland), Pavida Pananond (Thammasat University), Marina Papanastassiou (Middlesex University, UK), Robert Read (Lancaster University, UK), Grazia Santangelo (University of Catania, Italy), Teresa da Silva Lopes (University of York, UK), Paz Tolentino (Birkbeck, University of London, UK), Nigel Wadeson (University of Reading) and many others.

Many influential members of the School have never studied or worked full-time at University of Reading, although many of them visit regularly, e.g. Lorraine Eden (Texas A&M University, College Station), Niron Hashai (Hebrew University of Jerusalem), Ram Mudambi (Temple University, Philadelphia) and Alain Verbeke (University of Calgary, Canada). Other notable contributors to the Reading School approach are Simona Iammarino (London School of Economics, UK), Satwinder Singh (Brunel University, UK) and Lucia Piscitello (Politecnico di Milano, Italy).

== Key Publications ==
- Buckley, Peter J. and Mark C. Casson (1976) The Future of the Multinational Enterprise, London: Macmillan [Basingstoke, Hants: Palgrave Macmillan, 25th Anniversary ed. 2001], 112pp.
- Buckley, Peter J. and Mark C.Casson (1985) The Economic Theory of the Multinational Enterprise: Selected Papers, London: Macmillan, xii + 235pp.
- Buckley, Peter J. and Mark C.Casson (2009) The Multinational Enterprise Revisited: The Essential Buckley and Casson, Basingstoke, Hants: Palgrave Macmillan, x + 301pp.
- Buckley, Peter J. and Mark C.Casson (2009) The internalization theory of the multinational enterprise: A review of the progress of a research agenda after 30 years, Journal of International Business Studies, 40, 1563–80, doi. 10.1057/jibs.2009.49
- Cantwell, John A. (1989) Technological Innovation and Multinational Corporations, Oxford: Blackwell, xvi + 239pp.
- Dunning, John H. (1977) Trade, location of economic activity and the multinational enterprise: a search for an eclectic approach, in B. Ohlin, P.O. Hesselborn and P.M. Wijkman (eds.) The International Allocation of Economic Activity, London: Macmillan, 395–418.
- Dunning, John H. (1981) International Production and the Multinational Enterprise, London: Allen & Unwin, viii + 439pp.
- Dunning, John H., Buckley, Peter J. and Mark C. Casson (eds.) (1992) Multinational Enterprises in the World Economy : Essays in honour of John Dunning, Aldershot: Edward Elgar xix + 282pp.
- Dunning, John H. (2002) Global Capitalism, FDI and Competitiveness : The Selected Essays of John H. Dunning, Cheltenham: Edward Elgar, xi + 458pp.
- Dunning, John H. and Sarianna M. Lundan (2008) Multinational Enterprises and the Global Economy, 2nd. ed., Cheltenham: Edward Elgar, xxvi + 920pp.
- Pearce, Robert D. (1993) The Growth and Evolution of Multinational Enterprise: Patterns of Geographical and Industrial Diversification, Aldershot: Edward Elgar, xi + 176pp.
- Rugman, Alan M. (1981) Inside the Multinationals, London: Croom Helm [Basingstoke, Hants: Palgrave Macmillan, 25th Anniversary edition, 2006] xxxi + 164pp.
