= Lorraine Eden =

Canadian-American business manager

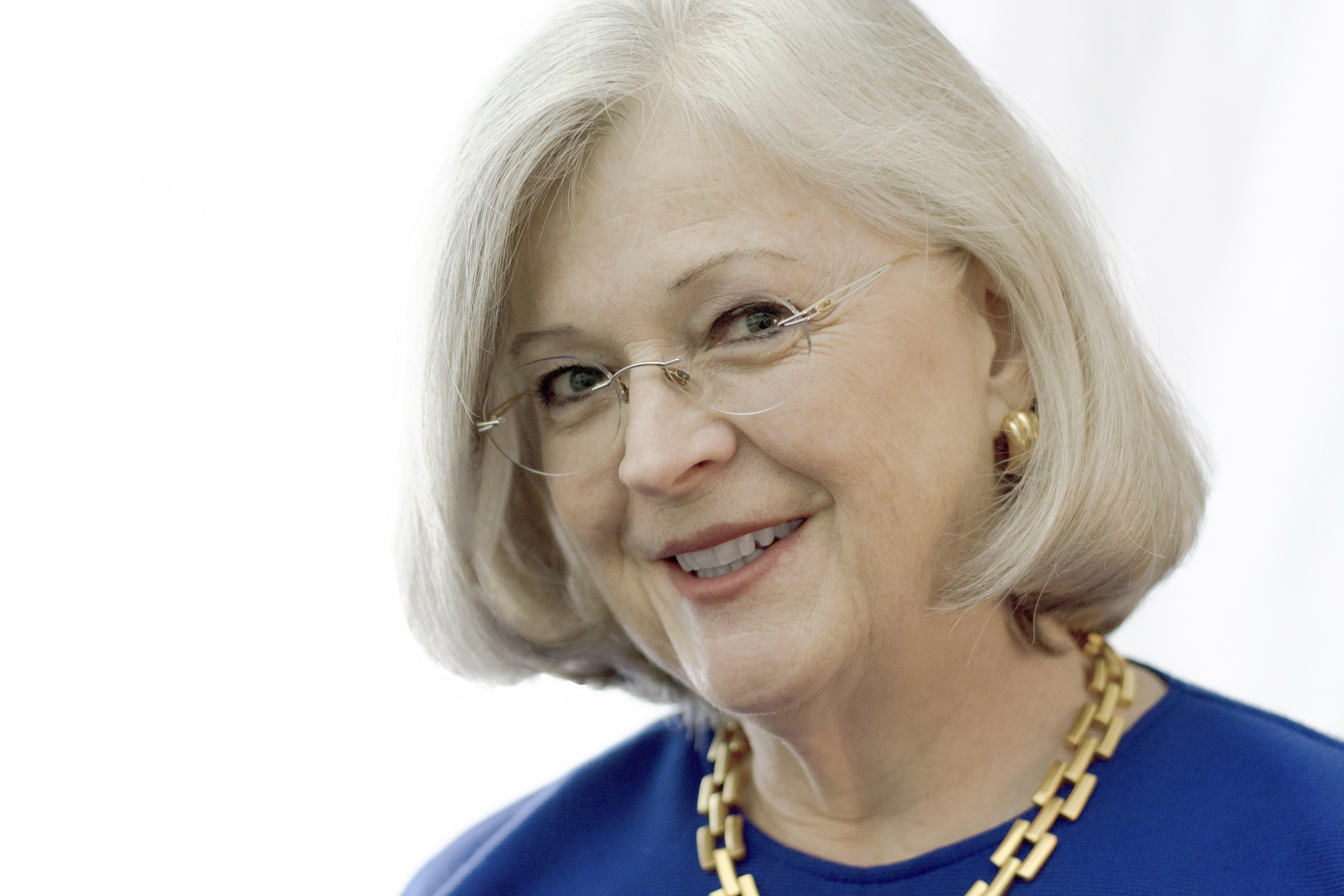
- Spouse: Charles F. Hermann

Academic background
- Education: Dalhousie University (PhD); McGill University (MA); Mount Allison University (BA)
- Influences: Carl S. Shoup (PhD advisor); John H. Dunning; Raymond Vernon; Charles Berry; Alan M. Rugman

Academic work
- Discipline: International Business; International Strategic Management; International Economics; International Political Economy
- Institutions: Texas A&M University
- Notable ideas: Transfer pricing Political economy of multinational enterprises Women in the Academy of International Business
- Awards: Fulbright; AIB Fellow; Pew Fellow; AIB President’s Award
- Website: http://mays.tamu.edu/directory/leden/ http://www.voxprof.com; Information at IDEAS / RePEc

Lorraine Eden is Professor Emerita of Management in the Mays Business School of Texas A&M University, College Station, Texas. She also holds a joint appointment as a research professor in the Texas A&M School of Law. Dr. Eden is an expert in the field of International Transfer Pricing, which is the pricing of products that move between subunits of Multinational Enterprises (MNEs).

Eden has more than 185 scholarly publications in the fields of international business, strategic management, international political economy and international economics. She has been identified as a prolific scholar in terms of number of publications in the top 45 high-impact business journals in 2010 and 2005–2015. She is listed as one of the Top 10% Female Economists, as of April 2015 by the Research Papers in Economics.

Eden is an author/editor of nine books, including Governance, Multinationals and Growth with Wendy Dobson, which was nominated for the International Political Economy Group's Best Book Award in 2005. She also edited the book Multinationals in North America in 1994, which provided valuable insights into the activities of the Multinational Enterprises as they relate to the society.

Her best known book is Taxing Multinationals: Transfer Pricing and Corporate Income Taxation in North America, published in 1998 by the University of Toronto Press. Taxing Multinationals, a seminal work in the field of transfer pricing, is a multidisciplinary study, which explains the basic motivations and structures of multinational enterprises, their trade patterns in the North American continent; introduces the fundamentals of corporate income taxation to build upon the concepts of international transfer pricing—including transfer pricing procedures in the United States and Canada, transfer pricing manipulation, and ways to effectively reform the tax transfer pricing policies.

Eden served as a departmental editor from 2003 to 2006 for the Journal of International Business Studies, the top-ranking academic journal in the field of international business. She served as the journal's editor-in-chief from July 2007 to December 2010. Since 2013, she has continued her involvement as a consulting editor.

== Education and career ==
Eden completed her PhD in economics with Distinction from Dalhousie University, Halifax, Canada. She was a student of and wrote her PhD dissertation - titled, "A Microeconomic Theory of Multinational Behavior Under Trade Barriers" - under noted economist, Carl Shoup when he arrived at Dalhousie University's Economics department in the capacity of a Senior Killam Fellow in 1974 after retiring from Columbia University. Her 1991 edited book, Retrospectives on Public Finance, was a collection of essays, which were presented at a conference in Ottawa in I989 in honor of Dr. Carl Shoup.

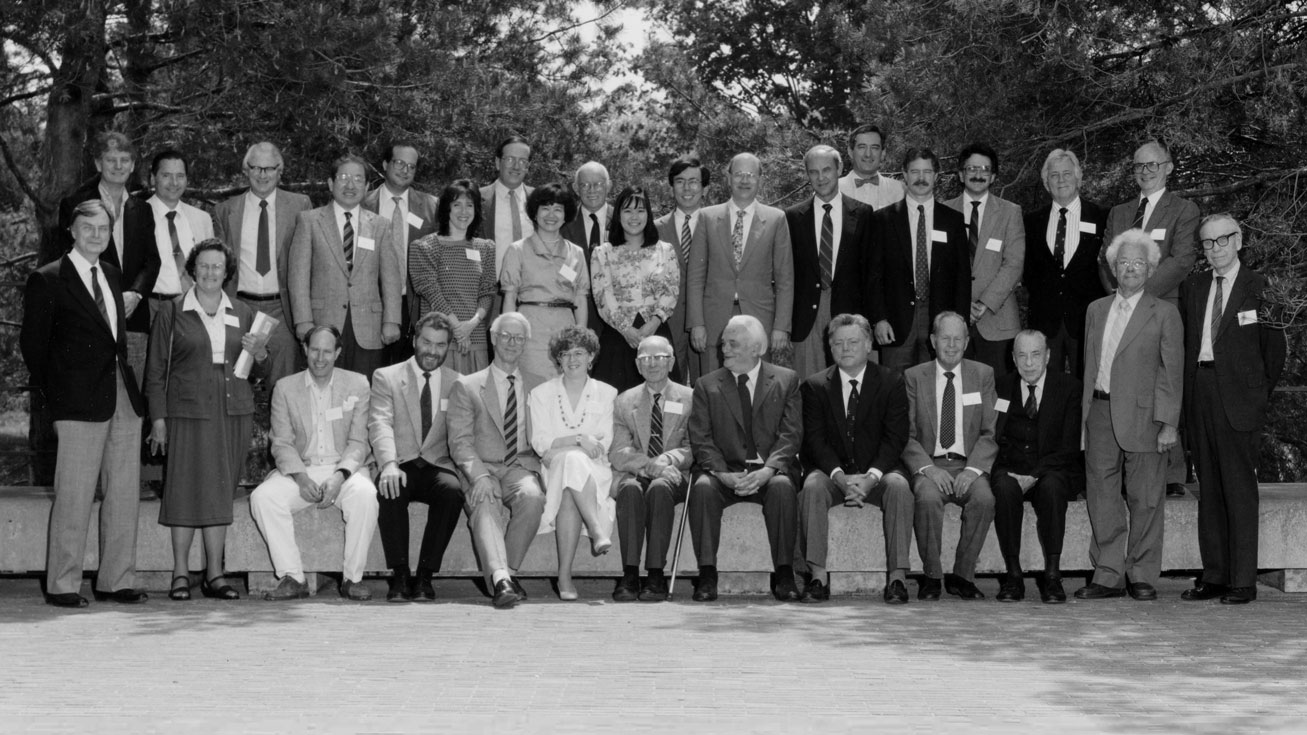
Lorraine Eden (in the middle) poses for a photograph with Carl Shoup at a conference organized in his honor in Ottawa, Ontario, Canada in 1989. Joining them to the right of Carl Shoup is William Vickrey; Richard Musgrave is second from the right in the front row; Peggy Musgrave is second from the left in the front row.

Eden served as an associate professor from 1988 to 1992 and full professor from 1992 to 1995 at the Norman Paterson School of International Affairs at the Carleton University. Eden received a Pew Faculty Fellowship in International Affairs Case Teaching and Research from 1991 to 1992, and a Canada-US Fulbright Research Fellowship from 1992 to 1993 to teach at the Kennedy School of Government at Harvard University. She joined the Mays Business School of Texas A&M University in 1995 as an associate professor, and has served as a full professor since 2002. Eden has also held visiting professorships at Harvard University, University of Texas at Austin, University of Reading, and Ohio State University.

Eden is regularly consulted by major multinational corporations, United Nations Conference on Trade and Development and government tax authorities in matters relating to international tax and transfer pricing. In 2001, she helped the US Bureau of Labor Statistics in redesigning the US import and export price indexes; this was done to more precisely represent the intra-firm transactions of multinational enterprises.

Eden has founded several organizations and designed several innovative activities, including

- Canadian Women Economists Network (CWEN), a women's networking group in the Canadian Economics Association (founded in 1990).
- Active Learning in International Affairs (ALIAS), a section of the International Studies Association (received its ISA Charter in 1996).
- Women in the Academy of International Business (WAIB), a women's networking group in the Academy of International Business (founded in 2001).
- Codes of Ethics for the Journal of International Business Studies (2007) and for the Academy of International Business (2012).
- Transfer Pricing Aggies, a networking group for former students working in transfer pricing and related careers (founded in 2010).
- The Ethicist, a blog on professional ethics for the Academy of Management (founded in 2011).

== Publications ==
=== Books ===
- Multinationals and Transfer Pricing, was co-edited with A.M. Rugman, published by St. Martin's Press in 1985. 336 pp. (ISBN 978-0312552572)
- Retrospectives on Public Finance as part of the Fiscal Reform in the Developing World Series, ed. 1991, was published by Duke University Press. 409 pp.
- Multinationals in the Global Political Economy, was co-edited with Evan Potter, published by Macmillan in London, St. Martin's Press in New York, and McClelland and Stewart in Toronto in 1993. 213 pp. (ISBN 978-0312096328 )
- Multinationals in North America as part of the Industry Canada Research Series Volume, was published by University of Calgary Press in English and French in 1994 (Reprinted in 1996). 662 pp. (ISBN 978-1895176476)
- Taxing Multinationals: Transfer Pricing and Corporate Income Taxation in North America, was published by University of Toronto Press in 1998. 757 pp. (ISBN 978-0802007766)
- Governance, Multinationals and Growth, was co-edited with Wendy Dobson Cheltenham, published by Edward Elgar Publishing in 2005. 400 pp. (ISBN 978-1843769095 )

=== Other publications ===
Eden has also published more than 150 articles in various economics, accounting, business and management academic journals including the International Trade Journal; Journal of International Management; Journal of International Business Studies; Canadian Journal of Economics; Academy of Management Review; Millennium; Public Finance/Finances Publiques; Asian Survey; Accounting, Organizations and Society; and, Academy of Management Journal amongst others. A complete list of her publications is available online.

== Awards and honours ==
- Member of the 2015 Task Force on Investment, E15 Initiative on Strengthening the Global Trading System, World Economic Forum and the International Commission on Trade and Sustainable Development, Geneva, CH.
- Gina and Anthony Bahr '91 Professorship in Business, April 2015.
- Chosen for a two-year appointment as one of 25 members of the Research Advisory Network to the Global Commission on Internet Governance (GCIG), a joint project of Centre for International Governance Innovation and Chatham House, on the future of multi-stakeholder Internet governance, March 2014.
- John H. Dunning President's Award for outstanding service to the Academy of International Business and the field of international business, July 2012.
- Inaugural holder of the John H. Dunning Visiting Professorship, Henley Business School, University of Reading, Reading, UK, 2010–2011.
- Identified as the most prolific scholar in terms of number of publications in the top 45 high-impact business journals in 2010 (based on SSCI Journal Citation Reports).
- Founder's Recognition Award, Women in the Academy of International Business, 2007.
- Who's Who in America - 2006, 60th Diamond Edition, Marquis, 2005
- Elected as a fellow of the Academy of International Business, May 2004.
- Founder, Women in the Academy of International Business (WAIB), 2001–2003; Past President 2003–2005.
- Vice president and program chair, Academy of International Business, Nov. 2000-August 2002.
- Who's Who in International Business Education and Research, 1999.
- Canada-US Fulbright Research Award at the Kennedy School of Harvard University, 1992–93.
- Pew Faculty Fellowship in International Affairs: The Kennedy School of Government, Harvard University, 1991–92.
- Vice-president, Canadian Economics Association, 1990–91.
- Elected to membership in International Institute of Public Finance, 1985.

== Personal life ==
Lorraine Eden was born in Canada and is a naturalized US citizen. She is a member of SODRAC and holds the copyrights to her father Garnet (Gary) Boyd's sheet music and song lyrics. Eden is married to Dr. Charles F. Hermann and they have three children. Her brother David K.R. Boyd is a Canadian author of children's books.

== Recent work ==
Between 2007 and 2018, Eden taught a graduate seminar on transfer pricing at Texas A&M University to nearly 350 graduate students, one-third of whom went on to launch careers in this field. Most of her former students are networked on LinkedIn as the Transfer Pricing Aggies. She consults on transfer pricing matters (especially controversy) through the Analysis Group.
