= Stephen Hymer =

Canadian economist

- Born: 15 November 1934; Montreal, Quebec, Canada
- Died: 2 February 1974 (aged 39); Shandaken, New York, United States

Academic background
- Education: McGill University; Massachusetts Institute of Technology
- Doctoral advisor: Charles P. Kindleberger
- Influences: Karl Marx

Academic work
- Discipline: International economics, International Business, Internationalization
- School or tradition: Marxian economics
- Institutions: Yale University; The New School for Social Research
- Notable ideas: Theory of foreign direct investments

Stephen Herbert Hymer (15 November 1934 – 2 February 1974) was a Canadian economist. His research focused on the activities of multinational firms, which was the subject of his PhD dissertation The International Operations of National Firms: A Study of Direct Foreign Investment, presented in 1960, but published posthumously in 1976, by the Department of Economics from Massachusetts Institute of Technology. Charles P. Kindleberger, his thesis supervisor, submitted it for publication, as mentioned by him on the introduction of Hymer's thesis dissertation.

== Personal life ==
Hymer was born in Montreal, Quebec, Canada. Stephen Herbert Hymer's father was a Jewish clothing store owner from Poland and his mother was the bookkeeper. This inspired him to research the impact that multinational corporations have on local enterprises, as he feared the presence of new competitors might end up affecting his family's business.

Hymer received a B.A. with first-class honors in Economics and Political Science from McGill University in his native Montreal in 1955. He enrolled at MIT in the fall of that year to study industrial relations, having moved to Boston where he met his wife, Gilda, also from Montreal. He taught economics at Yale University and had two sons. From 1970 until the time of this death, Hymer worked as an economics professor at the New School for Social Research in New York.

He combined his interests in Industrial Organization and International Trade in his doctoral thesis. Hymer died after a car accident in Shandaken, New York.

== Contributions ==
Stephen Hymer is considered to be the father of International Business due to his contributions related to Foreign Direct Investment as well as his studies and academic production on the field of theories of multinational enterprises.

Hymer's main contributions, which predated most of today's existing theory on the subjects of multinational enterprises and Foreign Direct Investment (FDI), are collected in eleven documents, including his 1960 doctoral thesis. Before his theory on FDI, all investments were considered to be mere capital movements across borders. These movements of capital were thought to be determined mainly by the differences in interest rates between the countries. Hymer established that there was a distinction between financial investments and these kinds of investments, which he named Foreign Direct Investment: the latter gives the firm control over the business activities in other countries whereas portfolio investment does not.

The theory presented by Stephen Hymer is considered a departure from neo-classical perspective and the consideration of a perfect market structure. Hymer's main conclusion is that foreign direct investment can only succeed as long as there are market imperfections that can create advantages and conflicts: companies could reduce their competition by implementing foreign direct investment. In this way, companies can eliminate the arising conflicts in the market and benefit from their specific advantages.

Hymer considered multinational firms to be better institutions than actual international markets in the process of stimulating business, and for information transmitting as well as price fixing. This was all elaborated by Dunning and Pitelis in the academic paper: "Stephen Hymer's Contribution to International Business Scholarship: An assessment and extension".

In the analysis of the nature and causes of foreign investment, Hymer made a distinction between direct and portfolio investment. After ascertaining that differences in interest rates cause portfolio investments, but not direct investments, and that the industrial distribution of the latter is not significantly different from one country to another, as could be expected if their cause was solely differences in profitability, Hymer concluded that direct investments are capital movements associated to international operations of firms. Their goal is to keep control of production. This control allows either to suppress competition, or appropriate rents derived from advantages like skilled labour, cheap raw materials, access to capital markets or technology.

Later, Hymer used Marxian language and concepts more explicitly. Hymer wrote ″it was difficult for young people (in America) to gain access to Marx. His language seemed impenetrable, and there were hardly any courses in the universities to help people understand him. In fact, there were few who had any idea even of what was different about Marx″.

In a series of articles published in the 1970s, he considered the relationship between nation-states and multinational firms, detailing their role in the creation of an international division of labor. Hymer argued that this hierarchal division of labor was a macrocosm of the internal division of labor reproduced within the multinational corporation. Hymer did not believe that these firms had become more powerful than nation-states; instead, multinationals were firmly rooted in the major financial centers of the world, and they tended to reinforce existing geographic and spatial boundaries and dependencies. Papers and articles on this and various other topics articles were compiled by Hymer's graduate students from the New School for Social Research in The Multinational Corporation: A Radical Approach. Papers by Stephen Herbert Hymer, published by Cambridge University Press in 1979.

Hymer's theories have strongly influenced other economists, like Cantwell and John Harry Dunning, and were elaborated by Hymer's dissertation advisor, Charles P. Kindleberger in American Business Abroad, series of lectures published in 1969. The latter played an important role in the posthumous publication of Hymer's dissertation.

Many authors have used Hymer's theories to develop new theoretical approaches in the field of international business. One of these new theories is the OLI paradigm (ownership-location-internalization) also known as the eclectic paradigm, developed by John Dunning (1977), which adopts Hymer's firms' specific advantages.

== See also ==
- Monopolistic advantage theory

== Selected publications ==
- Hymer, S., & Resnick, S. (1969). A model of an agrarian economy with nonagricultural activities. The american economic review, 59(4), 493-506.
- Hymer, S. (1970). The efficiency (contradictions) of multinational corporations. American economic review, 60(2), 441-448.
- Hymer, S. (1972). The internationalization of capital. Journal of economic issues, 6(1), 91-111.
- Hymer, S. (1972) 'The Multinational Corporation and The Law of Uneven Development', in J. Bhagwati (ed.) Economics and World Order from The 1970s to the 1990s, Collier-MacMillan:New York, pp: 113-140.
