= John Harry Dunning =

British economist (1927–2009)

- Born: 26 June 1927; Sandy, Bedfordshire
- Died: 29 January 2009 (aged 81)
- Education: University College London
- Scientific career
- Fields: International business, the theory of the multinational enterprise
- Notable students: Rajneesh Narula, Frank Stilwell (economist)

John Harry Dunning OBE (26 June 1927 – 29 January 2009) was a British economist and is widely recognised as the father of the field of international business. He researched the economics of international direct investment and the multinational enterprise from the 1950s until his death. In the 1980s, he published the eclectic paradigm or OLI-Model/Framework as further development on Internalization theory. OLI remains the predominant theoretical perspective to study international business activities, notably foreign direct investment and multinational enterprises. His first book, American Investment in British Manufacturing Industry (1958), is the first seminal work in the international business field.

== Biography ==
John Dunning was born in Sandy, Bedfordshire on 26 June 1927. At the age of 15 he took a junior clerical position with S.E. Higgins & Co., a London insurance brokerage. Shortly thereafter he took a position in London with Banco de Bilbao and began taking classes in English, Elements of Banking and Accounting, and Foreign Exchange.

As World War II drew to a close, Dunning joined the Royal Navy and was posted to Sri Lanka (then called Ceylon) in 1945. Upon completing his naval tour, he earned his BSc in Economics from the University College London. He joined the Department of Economics at the University of Southampton in 1952 as an assistant lecturer and earned the position of senior lecturer in 1962. In 1953 Dunning began research on the FDI of American firms into the UK and its effect on UK economic performance, which resulted in the seminal 1958 book, American Investment in British Manufacturing Industry.

In 1964 Dunning was appointed Foundation Chair of Economics at the University of Reading. During his tenure as head of the economics department at Reading, he published much of his influential work on the eclectic paradigm. He and other Reading colleagues published work on the theory of the multinational enterprise that influenced the academic field of international business to such a degree that the stream of MNE research based on the eclectic paradigm is considered the Reading School of International Business.

There are two institutions greatly influenced by John Dunning, one of which he created and one which he presided over and took to new heights. The first of these is the University of Reading, where he created a rich intellectual environment, starting in the 1970s, in which deep theoretical analysis and rich empirical work was fostered to explain the activities of multinational enterprise. He recruited scholars to the University who included Mark Casson, Peter Buckley, John Cantwell, Bob Pierce, Rajneesh Narula, Klaus Meyer, Sarianna Lundan, and many others who have made significant scholarly contributions. Dunning supervised several dozen doctoral students at Reading including Professor James H Landi, prominent among them being Jeremy Clegg. Dunning subsequently started a doctoral program in international business at Rutgers University in New Jersey, United States.

The second institution fostered by Dunning is the Academy of International Business, of which he served as President and also as Dean of the Fellows of AIB. Dunning regularly presented new papers and inspired new areas of research, such as his recent work on corporate governance and the ethics of multinationals. Dunning was also a founder of the European International Business Academy.

Since August 2008 the triple-accredited Henley Business School at the University of Reading has been home to the John H. Dunning Centre for International Business, formerly the Centre for International Business and Strategy (CIBS). The Centre was renamed in 2008, in honour of the late professor Dunning, and stands as one of the world's premier research centres in the field. Internationally renowned members of the Centre include professors Alan Rugman, Mark Casson and Rajneesh Narula (one of Dunning's notable doctoral students, and the founding director of Dunning Centre).

Dunning died on 29 January 2009, a year after being diagnosed with cancer. In the same year, Journal of International Business Studies, the most prestigious academic journal in international business, commented, "John Dunning is widely recognized as the father of the field of international business" and "Today, John's influence is demonstrated by a citation count on Google Scholar of over 30,000, many times that of any other scholar in the field of international business."

== Publications ==
- American Investment in British Manufacturing Industry (1958)
- Globalization of Firms and the Competitiveness of Nations (1990)
- Multinational Enterprises and the Global Economy (1992) Addison-Wesley Publishers Ltd.
- Alliance Capitalism and Global Business (1997)
- Making Globalization Good: the Moral Challenges of Global Capitalism (2005) ISBN 978-0199275229
- Seasons of a Scholar: Some Personal Reflections of an International Business Economist (2008)

== Honorary doctorates ==
- Uppsala University (Sweden, 1975)
- Autonomous University of Madrid (Spain, 1990)
- University of Antwerp (Belgium, 1997)
- Chinese Culture University (Taiwan, 2007)
- Lund University (Sweden, 2007)
- University of Reading (UK, 2008)

== See also ==
- Alliance capitalism
