= Roberta Edgecombe Robb =

Canadian economist

Roberta Edgecombe Robb is a Canadian economist, and Professor Emeritus of Economics at Brock University. She is co-founder and past president of the Canadian Women Economists Network (CWEN). Her research primarily focuses on women's status in the workplace and related government policy.

== Education and career ==
Robb attended the Memorial University of Newfoundland (MUN), where she graduated with a Bachelor of Arts. She then completed a master's degree at UBC before taking a job with the Memorial University's department of economics. She later left this position to study for a PhD at the University of Essex (UK) and when she returned to Canada she took on a position at Brock University. Robb has served on the editorial board for the Canadian Journal of Economics from 1978 to 1981, as Chair of the Economics Department at Brock from 1986 to 1989, and as Director of the Women's Studies Program at Brock from 1999 to 2002. In 1990, Robb, with Lorraine Eden, co-founded the Canadian Women Economists Network. From 1997 to 1999, she served as president of CWEN.

=== CWEC/CFÉC Service Award ===
In 2019, Robb was recognized by the Canadian Women Economists Committee (CWEC/CFÉC)—successor organization to CWEN and part of the Canadian Economics Association—with the inaugural CWEC/CFÉC Service Award.

== Select bibliography ==
- Robb, Roberta Edgecombe (May 1978). "Differentials between Males and Females in Ontario, 1971". The Canadian Journal of Economics. 11 (2): 350–359. doi:10.2307/134356. JSTOR 134356.
- Gunderson, Morley (August 1979). "Decomposition of the Male/Female Earnings Differential: Canada 1970". The Canadian Journal of Economics. 12 (3): 479–485. doi:10.2307/134736. JSTOR 134736.
- Robb, Roberta Edgecombe (December 1987). "Equal Pay for Work of Equal Value: Issues and Policies". Canadian Public Policy. 13 (4): 445–461. doi:10.2307/3550886. JSTOR 3550886.
- Robb, Roberta Edgecombe; Robb, A. Leslie (Winter 1999). "Gender and the Study of Economics: The Role of Gender of the Instructor". The Journal of Economic Education. 30 (1): 3–19. doi:10.2307/1183028. JSTOR 1183028.
