= Competitive Alternatives =

KPMG guide to international business site locations

KPMG's Competitive Alternatives is a biennial guide to comparing international business site locations in North America, Europe, and Asia Pacific. The primary focus of the study is international business costs. The study measures the impact of significant costs that vary by location, as applied to different business operations. Demand for the guide has grown significantly since it was first introduced in 1996. The founding study compared 23 cities in 7 business operations in Canada and the United States. In 2010, the analysis included 112 cities in 17 business operations in Australia, Canada, France, Germany, Italy, Japan, Mexico, the Netherlands, the United Kingdom, and the United States.

== Description ==
The primary focus of Competitive Alternatives is international business costs. In the 2010 edition, the study measured the combined impact of 26 significant cost components that were most likely to vary by location, as applied to 17 different business operations over 10 years. The study also compares a variety of non-cost factors that also influence the relative attractiveness of locations to business; aspects considered by the 2010 study included labour availability and skills, economic conditions and markets, innovation, infrastructure, and regulatory environment, as well as personal cost of living and quality of life.

== Methodology ==
The methodology of the study is focused on seven key areas: design of cost model, identification of key location-sensitive cost components, definition of the standard business operations, specification of common business model assumptions, method for estimating labour costs, method for estimating transportation/distribution costs, and a method for estimating taxes.

== Media coverage ==
Competitive Alternatives has been widely covered in the international business media. In September 2010, The Australian reported that the study found Australia to be maintaining its position since 2008, and that "Melbourne and Sydney were 'relatively affordable', well ahead of the most expensive cities, Osaka and Tokyo, but way behind Monterrey and Mexico City." A CFO.com article cited that KPMG ranked 22 of the largest US cities on a variety of business operating costs and found "Tampa leads the pack as the most cost-competitive large city for business in the USA, followed by Atlanta and Miami." USA Today cited that the study found the United States to have considerably improved its competitive position in 2008, relative to its 2006 positioning where it lagged behind many other G7 countries. The Globe and Mail cited that Competitive Alternatives found Mexico to be leading the way in 2008, followed by Canada, the United States, Australia, France, the United Kingdom, the Netherlands, Italy, Japan, and then Germany.

== Editions ==
The 2010 edition of the publication compared costs of 17 business operations in 112 cities in 10 countries: Australia, Canada, France, Italy, Japan, Germany, Mexico, the Netherlands, the United Kingdom, and the United States. The 2010 edition expanded its coverage of large international business centers, adding a number of major global cities to the study and referenced that the international results now reflect business costs in each country's major metropolitan regions.

The 2008 edition compared costs of 17 business operations in 136 cities in 10 countries: Australia, Canada, France, Germany, Italy, Japan, Mexico, Netherlands, United Kingdom, and United States.

The 2006 edition compared costs of 17 business operations in 128 cities in 9 countries: Canada, France, Germany, Italy, Japan, Netherlands, Singapore, United Kingdom, and United States.

The 2004 edition compared costs of 17 business operations in 121 cities in 11 countries: Australia, Canada, France, Germany, Iceland, Italy, Japan, Luxemburg, Netherlands, United Kingdom, and United States.

The 2002 edition compared costs of 12 business operations in 115 cities in 9 countries: Australia, Canada, France, Germany, Italy, Japan, Netherlands, United Kingdom, and United States.

The 1999 edition compared costs of 7 seven business operations in 64 cities in 8 countries: Austria, Canada, France, Germany, Italy, Japan, United Kingdom, and United States.

The 1997 edition compared costs of 8 business operations in 42 cities in 7 countries: Canada, France Germany, Italy, Sweden, United Kingdom, and United States.

The 1996 edition compared costs of 7 business operations in 23 cities in Canada and the United States.
