= Ashton Sixth Form College =

- Ashton-under-Lyne, Greater Manchester, England

Information
- Type: Sixth Form College
- Motto: Disce est crescere (To learn is to grow)
- Established: 1928
- Department for Education URN: 146816 Tables
- Headmaster: Lisa Richards
- Enrolment: 2000
- Colour: Blue
- Website: www.asfc.ac.uk

Ashton Sixth Form College (commonly referred to as ASFC) is a sixth form college in Ashton-under-Lyne, Greater Manchester. Founded in 1928 as Ashton-under-Lyne Grammar School, the college is selective with an offer rate of 28% (2021).

== Academic performance ==
Ashton Sixth Form College was rated as 'Outstanding' by Ofsted in 2020, and as 'Good' in 2025. In 2022, 1,356 A* and A grades were rewarded to students, and 38 courses at the college achieved 100% pass rates.

The college was ranked 4th in Greater Manchester by the Department for Education, and 52nd in the U.K. by The Times, making it the highest-performing college in Tameside since its inception. It also ranks in the top 10% of colleges nationally.

Ashton Sixth Form College is increasingly oversubscribed, with an offer rate of 28% (2021).

== Notable alumni ==
- Gerard Kearns, actor
- Isabelle Smith, actress
- Melanie Sykes, model and television presenter

=== Ashton-under-Lyne Grammar School ===
- Peter Buckley, professor of International Business at the University of Manchester
- Ronald Fraser, actor
- Eldon Griffiths, Conservative MP
- Don McKillop, actor
- John Pendry, theoretical physicist
- John Savident, actor
- Gordon Taylor, footballer
