= David Boyd (author) =

Canadian author (1951–2025)

- Born: March 7, 1951; St. Stephen, New Brunswick
- Died: June 26, 2025 (aged 74); St. Stephen, New Brunswick
- Occupation: Author
- Writing career
- Genres: Children's, YA, Adult Historical Fiction
- Website: www.davidboyd.ca

David Boyd (March 7, 1951 – June 26, 2025) was a Canadian author residing in St. Stephen, New Brunswick. Boyd's body of work includes children's literature, young adult fiction, and adult historical fiction.

== Early life and education ==
Boyd was born in St Stephen, New Brunswick. He graduated from Mount Allison University with a BA in English in 1974. While still studying, he took a job at the private Applebee College, where he received the Prime Minister's Teaching Award in 1998.

== Career ==
Boyd was an English and Media teacher at Appleby College. He wrote a historical fiction series on World War II, "The Reflecting Man," for adults as D.K.R. Boyd and for children/YA readers as David Boyd.

As a playwright, Boyd adapted Shakespeare's Macbeth to create Macbeth: A Multimedia Event (1995) and Julius Caesar to create Caesar: A Multimedia Event (2005). In 1996, his Young Adult novel Bottom Drawer was nominated for a Governor General's Award. He also wrote dystopian fiction under the pseudonym of David Collins. He is the brother of economist Dr. Lorraine Eden.

== Selected works ==
Boyd published works across multiple genres, including children's literature, young adult fiction, and adult historical fiction. Notable works include:

- The Face in the Flames – 1989, reprinted 1998
- Spellbound! – 1990, reprinted 1998
- The Danger Beneath – 1990, reprinted 1998
- Earthwatch – 1990, reprinted 1998
- Looking for a Hero – 1993; e-book edition 2013
- Champlain Summer – 1993
- Bottom Drawer – 1996 (Nominated for a Governor General's Award); e-book edition 2013
- On The Lines: The Adventures of a Linesman in the N.H.L. (co-authored with Ron Finn) – 1993
- Leonardo’s Wings – 2005; e-book edition June 2013
- Little Sure Shot – 2005; e-book edition June 2013
- Khan of Khans – 2005; e-book edition June 2013
- Marco Polo and the Roc – 2006
- The Hidden Message – 2006
- Pearl Harbor – 2006
- Beware the Vikings – 2006
- Napoleon's Land Stand – 2006
- Hannibal – 2006
- Pearl of the Tsars – 2007
- Battle of Queenston Heights – 2007
- Closer To Hamlet – 2010
- Aftermath – 2010 (eBook edition); 2020 - KDP edition
- Runner – 2010 (eBook edition); 2020 - KDP edition
- The Grief Team – (as David Collins) – March 2013 (Kindle edition)
- My Mom Always Yells Too Loud in the Arena and Other Poems about Hockey – April 2013 (Apple iBook edition)
- Suleyman's Library – e-book edition June 2013
- Good Queen Bess – e-book edition June 2013
- Heart Of A Lion – e-book edition June 2013
- The Reflecting Man: Volume One – trade paperback and e-book edition July 2013
- The Reflecting Man: Volume Two – trade paperback and e-book edition April 2015
- The Reflecting Man: Volume Three – trade paperback and e-book edition May 2017
- The Reflecting Man: Volume Four – trade paperback and e-book edition April 2020
- The Reflecting Man: Volume Five - trade paperback and e-book edition April 2024
