= Peggy Brewer Musgrave =

Economist

Peggy Musgrave
- Born: January 3, 1924; Maldon, Essex, United Kingdom
- Died: August 18, 2017 (aged 93); New Jersey, United States
- Other names: Peggy (Brewer) Richman, Peggy B. Richman, Peggy B. Musgrave
- Spouse(s): Bennet B. Richman, Richard Musgrave
- Children: 3

Academic background
- Education: Johns Hopkins University
- Thesis: Economic aspects of the taxation of foreign-earned business income (1962)

Peggy Richman née Brewer, later Musgrave (1924 - 2017) was a British-American public finance scholar and economist. She was known for her work on taxation of foreign investments.

== Education and career ==
Musgrave started her undergrad studies at Cambridge University but was interrupted by the second world war. She completed her B.A. and M.A. in economics at American University in Washington, D.C. In 1962 she received her Ph.D. from Johns Hopkins University, and she received an award from the Ford Foundation for her Ph.D. dissertation.

Musgrave's academic career began as a research associate at Columbia University working with Carl Shoup. She taught international economics at the University of Pennsylvania and she was appointed as an assistant professor. She was part of the International Tax Program at Harvard Law School. She moved to Northeastern University in 1968 and by 1978 was a professor of economics. She also held the Ford research professor position at the University of California, Berkeley in 1977. She taught at Vassar College prior to moving to the University of California, Santa Cruz to take a position as a professor of economics in 1980. She was named provost of the University of Santa Cruz's Crown College in 1986, the first woman to hold the position of provost of Crown College. She stepped down as provost in 1988.

== Work ==
Musgrave is known for her work on international taxation and public finance. Musgrave is credited with the development of ideas centered on International taxation, especially on the United States' taxation of foreign investments which she established during her Ph.D. work. She spoke to the United States Senate about overseas investments and in the impact on the national economy.

The International Institute of Public Finance created the “Peggy and Richard Musgrave Prize” in 2003.

== Selected publications ==
- Musgrave, Richard Abel; Musgrave, Peggy B. (1989). Public Finance in Theory and Practice. New York: McGraw-Hill Book Co. ISBN 978-0-07-044127-9.
- Musgrave, Peggy B. (1969). United States Taxation of Foreign Investment Income. Law School of Harvard University. ISBN 978-0-915506-10-1.

== Personal life ==
She was the daughter of the British author Herbert Rogers Everard Brewer and his wife Blanche Rebecca, née Wedlock. Her first marriage after the Second World War was to the American Bennett B. Richman (1912-1989). This marriage resulted in two sons, Roger and Thomas. Her second marriage was to Richard Abel-Musgrave (1910–2007) she married around the mid-1960s. This marriage resulted in a daughter, Pamela.

Musgrave's second husband, Richard Musgrave, was also an economist.
