= Foreign direct investment and the environment =

Foreign direct investment and the environment involves international businesses and their interactions and impact on the natural world. These interactions can be observed through the stringency applied to foreign direct investment policy and the responsiveness of capital or labor incentive for investment inflows. The laws and regulations created by a country that focuses on environmental regimes can directly impact the levels of competition involving foreign direct investment they are exposed to. Fiscal and financial incentives stemming from ecological motivators, such as carbon taxation, are methods used based on the desired outcome within a country in order to attract foreign direct investment.

External funding sources that come from foreign direct investment stimulates the increase of innovative ideas surrounding technological advances while it also holds the potential to decrease unemployment. When financial and fiscal motives are combined with environmental consciousness, the promotion of green and sustainable innovations increases. Such environmental consciousness can result in the decrease of industrial pollutants, which contributes to infant mortality and other health issues. Policies created that attract innovative and environmentally conscious technological advancements have been stated as a great way to encourage increase in the abundance of environmentally friendly foreign direct investments. The Organization for Economic Co-operation and Development promotes policies that can have positive social and economic impacts.

Foreign direct investment does have the potential in initiating negative effects on countries as well. Foreign direct investments allow for the chance of compromise and collaboration between policies of negotiating countries, which brings the opportunity for new perspectives on green innovation. However, intensifying regulations around production costs, such as environmental effect, can decrease the attraction of foreign direct investment to that country. Businesses or governments may wish to negotiate with a country with less complicated policies, therefore decreasing a country's competitive edge on the international market.

== Environmental regulation and foreign direct investment incentives ==
A complete list of foreign direct investment incentives that can be applied in regards to international business can be found in Foreign direct investment.

Some researchers find foreign direct investment leads to strict environmental policy. Environmental consciousness has been a pressing topic for discussion and concern in the global community as has been seen in the recent Paris Agreement. For a country to become more attractive to foreign investors, one may consider implementing incentives that simultaneously reduce cost while also enabling environmental initiatives. Incentives are policy or regulation measures that are implemented to serve both as a reason to increase foreign direct investment while also maintaining control over the impact investment may have.

Fiscal incentives alone, such as taxation laws that aim to reduce the tax burden of a firm, do not largely contribute to attracting foreign direct investment in research and development. Financial incentives direct monetary contributions from a government to a firm; this could include direct capital subsidies or subsidized loans. Incentives that combine both fiscal and financial aspects, have the capacity to increase interest in investment.

== Foreign direct investment and environment in different countries ==
=== Canada ===
Canada is part of the OECD, an amalgamation of countries dedicated to working in unison to increase environmental sustainability. Research shows that the total amounts of CO_{2} emissions have been increasing for Canada. One study shows that Canada is not prepared to avoid the effects of environmental issues that come with economic growth as it does not have a high level of per capita GDP to avoid these negative effects at this time. While another study shows that Quebec which is a major exporter of hydropower, decreased their green house gas emissions by 35%.

Since the 1980s, Canada has developed more lenient foreign direct investment policies in order to attract investment. For example, recent Chinese investment in Canada's oil and gas industry has raised concerns that such investments may increase global emissions. Furthermore, Canada is involved in trade agreements over water with the United States such as NAFTA. Researchers argue trade agreements concerning water is affecting the sustainability of water management. It is stated that water governance and management is changing in Canada. There are many commodities that are produced with water, which may increase the competition for water resources and this may affect water security.

Canada has been taking preliminary steps to become more environmentally conscious within their trade agreements and environmental regulation policies. In order to address air pollution and its effects on the environment such as acid rain, Canada has partnered with the United States through Canada-United States Air Quality Agreement. Canada and the United States work together to address acid rain issues. Moreover, chemicals and waste industries have economic benefits however also pollute the environment. Canada is part of multiple groups such as United Nations Commission for Sustainable Development and Stockholm Convention on Persistent Organic Pollutants, to ensure waste management is effectively managed. In addition, Canada is part of multiple trade agreements to ensure economic growth as well as protection of the environment. Canada has made trade agreements that focus on both labor and the environment with countries such as Chile, which focus on promoting environmental transparency and strengthening the effectiveness of domestic environmental laws and regulations.

=== China ===
For the past 30 years China has experienced rapid economic growth. Many studies have been dedicated to documenting the impact foreign direct investment has on the environment in China. However, there have been varying conclusions as to whether or not such investment is environmentally beneficial for the country. Jiajia Zheng and Pengfei Sheng discovered that provinces in the East have higher evidence of market development and lower CO_{2} emissions while provinces in the West have lower evidence of market development and higher CO_{2} emissions. It has been documented by the scientific community that there is a correlation between foreign direct investment and increases in China's CO_{2} emissions as energy consumption in the long-term impacts CO_{2} emissions. Researchers found that a 1% increase in foreign direct investment stocks, increase industrial SO2 levels by 0.099%, which shows that increases in foreign direct investment impacts the level of emissions. When market development increases, so do the CO_{2} emissions. Moreover, sulfur dioxide emissions are said to be one of the main sources of pollution in the air.

Some researchers conclude that foreign direct investment does not have negative effects on China's natural environment. Studies have shown that the presence of foreign direct investment has the potential to reduce air pollution. Foreign direct investment can be beneficial to China's environment as the foreign companies bring more efficient technology which could improve productivity and energy efficiency. China progressed in its market oriented economy as this market oriented reform improved electricity generation efficiency. In addition, cleaner technology helps China's environment. Further, there is an openness of trade, which can impact the environment and has been studied. The results found that international trade would raise income, promote consumer spending on environmentally friendly goods and curb emissions as trade openness brings more technology through from developed countries which help the environment.

China is taking some steps towards a cleaner environment through policy-making. Studies have shown that environmental regulations have the potential to encourage industrial relocations. China has energy saving and airborne emissions reduction policies which have been stated to help move air-polluting industries. China has accomplished reducing carbon emissions through far reaching efficiency programs as in 2004, the country adopted national fuel-efficiency standards for vehicles. Although China is improving their environmental regulations, there is still more work to do such as increasing transparency of environmentally informed national accounts, and the need for greater enforcement.

=== India ===
Statistics have shown that although there is a long run, positive but marginal, impact of foreign direct investment in India, the long run growth of foreign direct investment impact on CO_{2} is even larger. It has been hypothesized that the impact on environment may be larger as CO_{2} emission is an air pollutant that is typically generated through economic activities. By the turn of this century, India had been named as the 4th highest in global ranking of CO_{2} emission.

Many developing countries desire increased inflows of foreign direct investment as it brings the potential of technological innovation. However, studies have shown a host country must reach a certain level of development in education and infrastructure sectors in able to truly capture any potential benefits foreign direct investment might bring. If a country already has sufficient funds in terms of per capita income, as well as an established financial market, foreign direct investment has the potential to influence positive economic growth. Pre-determined financial efficiency combined with an educated labor force are the two main measures of whether or not foreign direct investment will have a positive impact on economic growth within a country.

Since 1991, India has sought to increase foreign direct investment interest within their country by instilling liberal trade and investment policies. Since making these policy changes India has seen an increase in GDP growth rates at 7% annually. However, since the surge in foreign direct investment inflow, pollution emission and resource depletion has been increasing at alarming rates due to greater economic activity (such as the cement, transportation and paper industries). There is hope that as income growth increase, there would be a positive long run effect on the environment as consumer demand shifts towards relatively cleaner goods - this shift would cause pollution-intensive goods to fall, potentially reducing pollution emissions. India, as well as many developing countries, have been experiencing rapid economic development once adopting more liberal economic policies.

There is potential for regulation of industrial pollution to increase with further economic development due to the creation of developed public institutions capable of regulating environment depletion. However, until then these public sectors and institutions can be implemented, India will continue to experience increased resource depletion and pollution emissions with increases of foreign direct investment.

=== Nigeria ===
Studies have demonstrated that there is a causal link between Carbon dioxide per capita, and foreign direct investment inflow in Nigeria. Foreign direct investment can be critical in promoting growth in the adoption of new technologies, stimulating knowledge transfers, and introducing alternative management practices as well as better institutional organization arrangements. In many Developing countries foreign direct investment is expected to improve the balance of payments. Therefore, in many African countries, foreign direct investment impacts constitutes a key outcome of globalization which can propel them to support and promote liberalization policies. When a country adopts policies focused on liberalization, it aids in the increase of free movement capital. Therefore, long term capital, such as foreign direct investment, could then have the potential to embody adverse environmental consequences.

In many globalization discussions, it is argued that environmental quality can be viewed as a good, therefore increasing free trade and foreign direct investment would lead to a cleaner environment. In 1986, Nigeria saw foreign direct investment as a pathway to enhance growth that could span the entire economy and therefore adopted structural adjustment programs for foreign direct investment inflows. Due to the success of the structural adjustment programs, Nigeria has become the continent's second top foreign direct investment recipient, with their oil sector receiving 90% of foreign direct investment inflow.

However, Nigeria has demonstrated an inverse relationship between Gross domestic product (GDP) and Carbon dioxide emissions, as GDP per capita increases, per capita emission falls. A decline in the manufacturing sector shares in the country explains the average carbon dioxide emission per capita drop of 0.84 tons from 1980–1989 to 0.41 tons from 2000 to 2009. It has been documented in numerous studies that developing countries tend to utilize lax environmental regulations as a method of instilling unethical industries from developed countries in hopes of increasing economic gains. Studies have concluded that within Nigeria, although there is a long-standing relationship between quality of the environment and foreign direct investment whereas the same can not be said for foreign direct investment and economic growth. However arguments have been made that although "extractive" foreign direct investment may not have a significant impact on a countries growth and development, manufacturing foreign direct investment may be more beneficial. There is constant growing evidence demonstrating that the increase of foreign direct investment within Nigeria, leads to further deterioration of their natural environment.

=== Armenia ===
According to the report of Asian Development Outlook, Armenia's exports, international remittances, and private capital inflows have all been negatively impacted by regional and global downturns, which have caused the nation to enter its worst recession since shortly after independence. The recession caused a decline in many of Armenia's key economic sectors, including the production of chemicals, building materials, mining and metallurgy, and the trade in processed diamonds.

Agriculture did not experience any continuous expansion, and the services sector only expanded by 0.7 percent as a result of limited activity in the financial, tourist, communications, and transportation industries. As net remittance inflows, which had fuelled the housing bubble, fell by one-third and net foreign direct investment fell by around one-fourth to about US$700 million, private investment fell by 25%.

Due to the weak remittance inflows and the recession, private consumption also declined. The largest price increases in December 2009 were for sugar, fuel, prescription drugs, and home utilities, in that order. The inflation rate was 6.5 percent (ranging from 34 percent to 20 percent). The current account deficit decreased somewhat, from US$1.4 billion to US$1.3 billion, as a result of fewer remittance inflows and transfers, but increased relative to the declining GDP, from 11.6 percent in 2008 to 15.4 percent in 2009.
