= Peter Buckley (academic) =

British business professor

Peter Jennings Buckley OBE, FBA, FAcSS (born 11 July 1949) is Professor of International Business at the University of Leeds and director of the Centre for International Business at the University of Leeds (CIBUL).

Buckley was educated at Ashton-under-Lyne Grammar School and graduated from the University of York with a BA in social sciences (economics) in 1970. He also has an MA in development economics from the University of East Anglia and a PhD in economics from the University of Lancaster. In 2010 he was awarded an honorary doctorate by the Faculty of Economics at Uppsala University, Sweden.

Buckley's interest lies in the theory of multi-national enterprise and international business. In 1976, he and Mark Casson wrote the internalization theory of the multinational enterprise.

== Honours ==
Buckley was appointed an Officer of the Order of the British Empire (OBE) in 2012. In 2014 he was elected a Fellow of the British Academy, the United Kingdom's national academy for the humanities and social sciences. In September 2014, he was elected a Fellow of the Academy of Social Sciences. In 2018, Buckley was awarded an honorary Doctor of Laws from Carleton University.
