= International business =

Trade at a transnational scale

International business refers to the trade of goods and service goods, services, technology, capital and/or knowledge across national borders and at a global or transnational scale. It includes all commercial activities that promote the transfer of goods, services and values globally. It may also refer to a commercial entity that operates in different countries.

International business involves cross-border transactions of goods and services between two or more countries. These transactions include economic resources such as capital, skills, and labor, all of which contribute to the international production of physical goods and services like finance, banking, insurance, and construction. International business is also known as globalization.

To conduct business overseas, multinational companies must bridge separate national markets into a single global marketplace. Two macro-scale factors drive the trend towards greater globalization. The first is the elimination of barriers, which makes cross-border trade easier (e.g. enabling the free flow of goods, services, and capital—commonly referred to as "free trade"). The second is technological advancement, particularly in communication, information processing, and transportation technologies.

== Overview ==
The discourse surrounding international business has a transition in terminology over the years, reflecting shifts in understanding and the expanding scope of cross-border commerce. Initially, phrases such as "foreign trade" and "foreign exchange" were prevalent, embodying a static view of cross-border interactions. However, the term "foreign" often evoked notions of remoteness or strangeness, failing to capture the dynamic essence of international engagements.

As commerce evolved with the advent of firms engaging in substantial direct investments across borders, newer terms to encapsulate the changing landscape. The mid-19th century marked the rise of companies owning and controlling production facilities in various countries, a departure from the earlier norm where firms held minor or passive ("portfolio") investments abroad. This paradigm shift necessitated a fresh nomenclature, leading to the introduction of the term "multinational enterprise" (MNE), referring to entities with substantial operations in multiple nations.

"International business" is also defined as the study of the internationalization process of multinational enterprises. A multinational enterprise (MNE) is a company that has a worldwide approach to markets, production and/or operations in several countries. Well-known MNEs include fast-food companies such as: McDonald's, Yum! Brands, Starbucks, etc. Other industrial MNEs leaders include vehicle manufacturers such as: Ford Motor Company, and General Motors (GMC). Some consumer electronics producers such as Samsung, LG and Sony, and energy companies such as ExxonMobil and BP are also multinational enterprises.

Multinational enterprises range from any kind of business activity or market, from consumer goods to machinery manufacture; a company can become an international business. Therefore, to conduct business overseas, companies should be aware of all the factors that might affect any business activities, including, but not limited to: difference in legal systems, political systems, economic policy, language, accounting standards, labor standards, living standards, environmental standards, local cultures, corporate cultures, foreign-exchange markets, tariffs, import and export regulations, trade agreements, climate, and education. Each of these factors may require changes in how companies operate from one country to another. Each factor makes a difference and a connection.

One of the first scholars to engage in developing a theory of multinational companies was Canadian economist Stephen Hymer. Throughout his academic life, he developed theories that sought to explain foreign direct investment (FDI) and why firms become multinational.

There were three phases of internationalization according to Hymer's work. In this thesis, the author departs from neoclassical theory and opens up a new area of international production. At first, Hymer started analyzing neoclassical theory and financial investment, where the main reason for capital movement is the difference in interest rates. After this analysis, Hymer analyzed the characteristics of foreign investment by large companies for production and direct business purposes, calling this Foreign Direct Investment (FDI). By analyzing the two types of investments, Hymer distinguished financial investment from direct investment. The main distinguishing feature was control. Portfolio investment is a more passive approach, and the main purpose is financial gain, whereas in foreign direct investment a firm has control over the operations abroad. So, the traditional theory of investment based on differential interest rates does not explain the motivations for FDI.

According to Hymer, there are two main determinants of FDI; where an imperfect market structure is the key element. The first is the firm-specific advantages which are developed at the specific companies home country and, profitably, used in the foreign country. The second determinant is the removal of control where Hymer wrote: "When firms are interconnected, they compete in selling in the same market or one of the firms may sell to the other," and because of this "it may be profitable to substitute centralized decision-making for decentralized decision-making".

Hymer's second phase is his neoclassical article in 1968 that includes a theory of internationalization and explains the direction of growth of the international expansion of firms. In a later stage, Hymer went to a more Marxist approach where he explains that MNC as agents of an international capitalist system causing conflict and contradictions, causing among other things inequality and poverty in the world. Hymer is the "father of the theory of MNEs", and explains the motivations for companies doing direct business abroad.

Among modern economic theories of multinationals and foreign direct investment are internalization theory and John Dunning's OLI paradigm (standing for ownership, location and internationalization). Dunning was widely known for his research in economics of international direct investment and the multinational enterprise. His OLI paradigm, in particular, remains as the predominant theoretical contribution to study international business topics. Hymer and Dunning are considered founders of international business as a specialist field of study.

== Physical and social factors of competitive business and social environment ==
The conduct of international operations depends on a company's objectives and the means with which they carry them out. The operations affect and are affected by the physical and societal factors and the competitive environment.

=== Operations ===
All firms that want to go international have one goal in common; the desire to increase their respective economic values when engaging in international trade transactions. To accomplish this goal, each firm must develop its individual strategy and approach to maximize value, lower costs, and increase profits. A firm's value creation is the difference between V (the value of the product being sold) and C (the cost of production per each product sold).

Value creation can be categorized as: primary activities (research and development, production, marketing and sales, customer service) and as support activities (information systems, logistics, human resources). All of these activities must be managed effectively and be consistent with the firm strategy. However, the success of firms that extend internationally depends on the goods or services sold and on the firm's core competencies (Skills within the firm that competitors cannot easily match or imitate). For a firm to be successful, the firm's strategy must be consistent with the environment in which the firm operates. Therefore, the firm needs to change its organizational structure to reflect changes in the setting in which they are operating and the strategy they are pursuing.

Once a firm decides to enter a foreign market, it must decide on a mode of entry. There are six different modes to enter a foreign market, and each mode has pros and cons that are associated with it. The firm must decide which mode is most appropriately aligned with the company's goals and objectives. The six different modes of entry are exporting, turnkey projects, licensing, franchising, establishing joint ventures with a host-country firm, or setting up a new wholly owned subsidiary in the host country.

The first entry mode is exporting. Exporting is the sale of a product in a different national market than a centralized hub of manufacturing. In this way, a firm may realize a substantial scale of economies from its global sales revenue. As an example, many Japanese automakers made inroads into the U.S. market through exporting. There are two primary advantages to exporting: avoiding high costs of establishing manufacturing in a host country (when these are higher) and gaining an experience curve. Some possible disadvantages to exporting are high transport costs and high tariff barriers.

The second entry mode is a turnkey project. In a turnkey project, an independent contractor is hired by the company to oversee all of the preparation for entering a foreign market. Once the preparation is complete and the end of the contract is reached, the plant is turned over to the company fully ready for operation.

Licensing and franchising are two additional entry modes that are similar in operation. Licensing allows a licensor to grant the rights to an intangible property to the licensee for a specified period of time for a royalty fee. Franchising, on the other hand, is a specialized form of licensing in which the "franchisor" sells the intangible property to the franchisee, and also requires the franchisee operate as dictated by the franchisor.

Lastly, a joint venture and wholly owned subsidiary are two more entry modes in international business. A joint venture is when a firm created is jointly owned by two or more companies (Most joint venture are 50-50 partnerships). This is in contrast with a wholly owned subsidiary, when a firm owns 100 percent of the stock of a company in a foreign country because it has either set up a new operation or acquires an established firm in that country.

==== Types of operations ====
Exports and import

- Merchandise exports: goods exported—not including services.
- Merchandise imports: The physical good or product that is imported into the respective country. Countries import products or goods that their country lacks in. An example of this is that Colombia must import cars since there is no Colombian car company.
- Service exports: As of 2018, the fastest growing export sector. The majority of the companies create a product that requires installation, repairs, and troubleshooting, Service exports is simply a resident of one country providing a service to another country. A cloud software platform used by people or companies outside the home country.
- "Tourism and transportation, service performance, asset use".
- Exports and Imports of products, goods or services are usually a country's most important international economic transactions.

==== Top imports and exports in the world ====
Data is from the CIA World Factbook, compiled in 2017:

Partner name	Export (US$ thousand)	Import (US$ thousand)	Import partner share (%)	Export partner share (%)
World	14,639,041,733.88	14,748,663,389.75	100.00	100.00
United States	1,456,000,000	1,292,436,125.64	8.76	13.29
Japan	634,900,000	661,678,484.03	4.49	3.20
Germany	1,322,000,000	1,145,973,941.19	7.77	6.26
France	507,000,000	488,825,071.86	3.31	3.68
United Kingdom	407,300,000	359,480,074.29	2.44	4.17

=== Choice of entry mode in international business ===
Strategic variables affect the choice of entry mode for multinational corporation expansion beyond their domestic markets. These variables are global concentration, global synergies, and global strategic motivations of MNC.

- Global concentration: many MNEs share and overlap markets with a limited number of other corporations in the same industry.
- Global synergies: the reuse or sharing of resources by a corporation and may include marketing departments or other inputs that can be used in multiple markets. This includes, among other things, brand name recognition.
- Global strategic motivations: other factors beyond entry mode that are the basic reasons for corporate expansion into an additional market. These are strategic reasons that may include establishing a foreign outpost for expansion, developing sourcing sites among other strategic reasons.

=== Means of businesses ===
- Entry modes: Export/import, wholly owned subsidiary, merger or acquisition, alliances and joint ventures, licensing
- Modes: importing and exporting, tourism and transportation, licensing and franchising, turnkey operations, management contracts, direct investment and portfolio investments.
- Functions: marketing, global manufacturing and supply chain management, accounting, finance, human resources
- Overlaying alternatives: choice of countries, organization and control mechanisms

=== Physical and social factors ===
- Geographical influences: There are many different geographic factors that affect international business. These factors are: the geographical size, the climatic challenges happening throughout the world, the natural resources available on a specific territory, the population distribution in a country, etc.
- Social factors: Political policies: political disputes, particularly those that result in the military confrontation, can disrupt trade and investment.
- Legal policies: domestic and international laws play a big role in determining how a company can operate overseas.
- Behavioural factors: in a foreign environment, the related disciplines such as anthropology, psychology, and sociology are helpful for managers to get a better understanding of values, attitudes, and beliefs.
- Economic forces: economics explains country differences in costs, currency values, and market size.

=== Risks ===
- Faulty Planning

To achieve success in penetrating a foreign market and remaining profitable, efforts must be directed towards the planning and execution of Phase I. The use of conventional SWOT analysis, market research, and cultural research, will give a firm appropriate tools to reduce risk of failure abroad. Risks that arise from poor planning include: large expenses in marketing, administration and product development (with no sales); disadvantages derived from local or federal laws of a foreign country, lack of popularity because of a saturated market, vandalism of physical property due to instability of country; etc. There are also cultural risks when entering a foreign market. Lack of research and understanding of local customs can lead to alienation of locals and brand dissociation. Strategic risks can be defined as the uncertainties and untapped opportunities embedded in your strategic intent and how well they are executed. As such, they are key matters for the board and impinge on the whole business, rather than just an isolated unit.

- Operational risk

A company has to be conscious about the production costs to not waste time and money. If the expenditures and costs are controlled, it will create an efficient production and help the internationalization. Operational risk is the prospect of loss resulting from inadequate or failed procedures, systems or policies; employee errors, systems failure, fraud or other criminal activity, or any event that disrupts business processes.

- Political risk

How a government governs a country (governance) can affect the operations of a firm. The government might be corrupt, hostile, or totalitarian; and may have a negative image around the globe. A firm's reputation can change if it operates in a country controlled by that type of government. Also, an unstable political situation can be a risk for multinational firms. Elections or any unexpected political event can change a country's situation and put a firm in an awkward position. Political risks are the likelihood that political forces will cause drastic changes in a country's business environment that hurt the profit and other goals of a business enterprise. Political risk tends to be greater in countries experiencing social unrest. When political risk is high, there is a high probability that a change will occur in the country's political environment that will endanger foreign firms there. Corrupt foreign governments may also take over the company without warning, as seen in Venezuela.

- Technological risk

Technological improvements bring many benefits, but some disadvantages as well. Some of these risks include "lack of security in electronic transactions, the cost of developing new technology ... the fact that this new technology may fail, and, when all of these are coupled with the outdated existing technology, [the fact that] the result may create a dangerous effect in doing business in the international arena."

- Environmental risk

Companies that establish a subsidiary or factory abroad need to be conscious about the externalizations they will produce, as some may have negative effects such as noise or pollution. This may cause aggravation to the people living there, which in turn can lead to a conflict. People want to live in a clean and quiet environment, without pollution or unnecessary noise. If a conflict arises, this may lead to a negative change in customer's perception of the company. Actual or potential threat of adverse effects on living organisms and environment by effluents, emissions, wastes, resource depletion, etc., arising out of an organization's activities is considered to be risks of the environment. As new business leaders come to fruition in their careers, it will be increasingly important to curb business activities and externalizations that may hurt the environment.

- Economic risk

These are the economic risks explained by Professor Okolo: "This comes from the inability of a country to meet its financial obligations. The changing of foreign-investment or/and domestic fiscal or monetary policies. The effect of exchange-rate and interest rate make it difficult to conduct international business." Moreover, it can be a risk for a company to operate in a country and they may experience an unexpected economic crisis after establishing the subsidiary. Economic risks is the likelihood that economic management will cause drastic changes in a country's business environment that hurt the profit and other goals of a business enterprise. In practice, the biggest problem arising from economic mismanagement has been inflation. Historically many governments have expanded their domestic money supplying misguided attempts to stimulate economic activity.

- Financial risk

According to Professor Okolo: "This area is affected by the currency exchange rate, government flexibility in allowing the firms to repatriate profits or funds outside the country. The devaluation and inflation will also affect the firm's ability to operate at an efficient capacity and still be stable." Furthermore, the taxes that a company has to pay might be advantageous or not. It might be higher or lower in the host countries. Then "the risk that a government will indiscriminately change the laws, regulations, or contracts governing an investment—or will fail to enforce them—in a way that reduces an investor's financial returns is what we call 'policy risk.'" Exchange rates can fluctuate rapidly for a variety of reasons, including economic instability and diplomatic issues.

- Terrorism

Terrorism is a voluntary act of violence towards a group(s) of people. In most cases, acts of terrorism is derived from hatred of religious, political and cultural beliefs. An example was the infamous 9/11 attacks, labeled as terrorism due to the massive damages inflicted on American society and the global economy stemming from the animosity towards Western culture by some radical Islamic groups. Terrorism not only affects civilians, but it also damages corporations and other businesses. These effects may include: physical vandalism or destruction of property, sales declining due to frightened consumers and governments issuing public safety restrictions. Firms engaging in international business will find it difficult to operate in a country that has an uncertain assurance of safety from these attacks.

- Bribery

Bribery is the act of receiving or soliciting of any items or services of value to influence the actions of a party with public or legal obligations. This is considered to an unethical form of practicing business and can have legal repercussions. Firm that want to operate legally should instruct employees to not involve themselves or the company in such activities. Companies should avoid doing business in countries where unstable forms of government exist as it could bring unfair advantages against domestic business and/or harm the social fabric of the citizens.

== Regulations ==
International business activities are governed by international commercial law, which is a set of legal rules, conventions, treaties, domestic laws and commercial customs used to regulate trade between countries. Therefore, It is a branch of law that basically aims to provide legal rules applicable to relations between business entities when the movement of products, services or values involves several countries.

After World War II and the rise of free trade between countries, multilateral arrangements such as the General Agreement on Tariffs and Trade (GATT) and later the World Trade Organization (WTO) became the primary mechanism for regulating global commerce. The International Chamber of Commerce (ICC) is another important organization that sets rules for international trade and resolves disputes.

== Sources ==
- Hill, Charles W. L. (2014). International Business: Competing in the Global Marketplace. McGraw Hill Education. ISBN 978-0-07-811277-5.
