= Mark Casson =

British economist & academic

Mark Casson FBA is a British economist, an academic and professor of economics at the University of Reading. He previously served as Head of the Department of Economics from 1987 to 1994 and is currently the Director of the Centre for Institutions and Economic History. He researched mentoring and academic development at the University of Reading.

Casson co-developed the internalization theory of the multinational enterprise with Peter Buckley, a framework in international business studies to explain the international expansion of firms. He has also written on the economic theory of entrepreneurship, drawing on ideas associated with economists including Joseph Schumpeter, Friedrich Hayek, and Frank Knight.

== Career ==
Casson’s research examines how institutions and culture influence entrepreneurial activity and the performance of multinational firms. He developed a leader-follower theory of culture, proposing that leaders establish cultural norms that shape the decision-making processes of entrepreneurs and managers. To test this theory, he applied institutional theory to business history and economic history. This approach led him to conduct a study on Victorian-era British entrepreneurship, specifically focusing on the construction of the railway system through private enterprise, which is the subject of one of his most recent books.

Casson is a founding member of the Reading School of International Business, a group of scholars associated with the University of Reading who contributed to the development of modern theories of multinational enterprises. Casson also serves as the general editor of two book series: The Globalization of the World Economy and Handbooks of Research Methods and Applications in the Social Sciences.

== Internalization theory ==
Casson also co-developed the internalization theory of the multinational enterprise with Peter Buckley, which explains why firms internalize certain transactions rather than relying on markets when knowledge or other assets are difficult to trade. The framework has become influential in the study of multinational corporations and foreign direct investment.

According to this framework, market imperfections make certain goods and services difficult to sell. In particular, an individual who acquires some knowledge that affords a profit opportunity will find it difficult to sell that knowledge to anyone else. In this context, the transfer of proprietary knowledge can be challenging because potential buyers may not be able to accurately value the information without it being fully disclosed.

Firms that undertake R&D are in this position. They find it difficult to license new technologies they have developed and therefore have to exploit their knowledge themselves. To serve the global markets, they need to establish an international network of production plants and/or sales outlets. Because they operate facilities in more than one country, they become a multinational enterprise. The foreign facilities are linked by common dependence on the R&D facility. If different plants specialize in different parts of the production process, then the plants will also be linked by international intermediate product flows. These intermediate product flows will also be internal to the firm. Internalization theory can be extended to analyze other ways of exploiting knowledge, including licensing, subcontracting (outsourcing), and strategic alliances (joint ventures).

== Economic theory of entrepreneurship ==
Casson developed an economic theory of entrepreneurship that emphasizes the role of judgment under uncertainty in coordinating resources and identifying opportunities. His work synthesizes ideas from economists such as Richard Cantillon, Frank Knight, Joseph Schumpeter, Friedrich Hayek, and Israel Kirzner.

According to Casson, entrepreneurship signifies the promotion of innovative high-risk projects that contribute to economic efficiency and growth. Risky innovations can easily fail, however, Casson argues that entrepreneurs must trade off the expected benefits of success against the expected costs of failure. If there were simple rules for making these calculations, then politicians or planners could take innovation decisions. But such decisions are more akin to medical diagnosis than to pure calculation. Information is incomplete and decisions must be based on symptoms rather than facts. Successful decisions depend on good judgement, in other words. Different people observe different symptoms and may even interpret the same symptom differently, so consensus is impossible. Under these conditions private entrepreneurs, who are confident in their own judgement and optimistic of success, step forward and commit their own funds (or those of family, friends and shareholders) to a project. If their judgment is sound they make a profit and if it is not they lose. In effect they bet against the sceptics who do not invest. Because the skeptics stay out, successful entrepreneurs may well achieve a monopoly position until opinions change and imitators appear. Casson develops this approach in several directions, including formal models of entrepreneurship that demonstrate its contribution to economic performance and allow that contribution to be measured.

== Economics of culture ==
Casson proposed a ‘leader–follower’ model of culture in which leaders shape the values and beliefs that guide organizational decision-making. In economic terminology, the values and beliefs represent intangible public goods, supplied by the leaders to their respective followers. In a free society, different leaders espouse different values and compete for followers' allegiance. In a civilized society, competition will be based on discussion and debate in which leaders criticize each other's views, as well as promoting their own. Competition between leaders empowers followers to choose the leaders they prefer. Leadership is a costly activity, and a leader can be rewarded in a variety of ways; many form non-profit organizations which attract donations or membership subscriptions. Casson's theory of leadership has an analogy with his theory of entrepreneurship, because entrepreneurs establish for-profit organizations (firms) to exploit special knowledge they have developed, which is a technological and factual analogue of the systems of values and beliefs developed and exploited by leaders.

Casson's work has proved controversial on several counts. His theory of entrepreneurship, which emphasizes the role of individual judgment and leadership in coordinating followers within firms, has been debated in the entrepreneurship literature. In an individualistic society everyone wants to be a leader and no one wants to be a follower, whereas in Casson's theory there cannot be a leader without followers. In popular culture leaders are often negatively stereotyped as autocratic 'fuhrer' figures, while in Casson's theory certain types of leader are benign. Some values, such as compassion, are superior to others, such as aggression, because they promote quality of life, and a leader who espouses such values confers benefits, not only on their own followers, but on society as a whole. Casson also argues that some values and beliefs are more efficient than others: in particular, cultures that encourage trust and legitimate innovation tend to raise the economic performance of a group. Casson's theory has political and ideological implications. For example, in Casson's theory, market competition is not an outlet for aggression, but a method of resolving differences of opinion in a peaceful way.

== Economic history ==
The Victorian British economy has been recognized as an important testing ground for theories of entrepreneurship and culture. There is a long-standing debate over the reasons for Britain's success in the Industrial Revolution (1760–1850), and its subsequent deindustrialization, in (1870–1914). In a 2009 study of the Victorian railway system, Casson argued that Britain's economic rise and decline were "two sides of the same coin". When individual enterprise, supported by family and community ties, was advantageous, Britain succeeded, and when it became a handicap, Britain failed.

In later work on economic history, Casson analyzed the development of Britain’s railway system and argued that political decisions during the nineteenth-century railway boom led to inefficiencies in the network. Casson argued that the British railway network was substantially overbuilt and that political institutions and support for private entrepreneurship contributed to inefficient investment. Some economic historians, however, emphasize the broader economic benefits of railway expansion and question whether overbuilding significantly harmed British industrial performance.

== Honours ==
In July 2017, Casson was elected a Fellow of the British Academy (FBA), the United Kingdom's national academy for the humanities and social sciences.

== Published books ==
- Casson, Mark C. and Catherine Casson (2013) The Entrepreneur in History, Basingstoke, Hants: Palgrave Macmillan, vii + 139pp.
- Casson, Mark C. (2010) Entrepreneurship: Theory, Networks, History, Cheltenham: Edward Elgar, viii + 400pp.
- Casson, Mark C. (2009) The World's First Railway System, Oxford: Oxford University Press, x + 540 pp. Reviewed by Grahame Boyes in J. Rly Canal Hist. Soc, 2010, 36, 131.
- Buckley, Peter J. and Mark C. Casson (2009) The Multinational Enterprise Revisited: The Essential Buckley and Casson (with Peter J. Buckley), Basingstoke, Hants: Palgrave Macmillan, x + 301pp.
- Casson, Mark C. (2000) Enterprise and Leadership: Studies on Firms, Markets and Networks, Cheltenham: Edward Elgar, x + 290 pp.
- Casson, Mark C. (2000) Economics of International Business; A New Research Agenda, Cheltenham: Edward Elgar, xi + 316 pp.
- Casson, Mark C. (1997) Information and Organization, Oxford: Oxford University Press.
- Casson, Mark C. (1995) Entrepreneurship and Business Culture, Aldershot: Edward Elgar, x + 283pp.
- Casson, Mark C. (1995) The Organization of International Business, Cheltenham: Edward Elgar, x + 209 pp.
- Casson, Mark C. (1991) Economics of Business Culture: Game Theory, Transaction Costs and Economic *Casson, Mark C. (1991)
- Casson, Mark C. (1990) Enterprise and Competitiveness Oxford: Clarendon Press
- Casson, Mark C. (1987) The Firm and the Market: Studies in Multinational Enterprises and the Scope of The Firm, Cambridge, Massachusetts: MIT Press and Oxford: Blackwell, xii + 283 pp.
- Casson, Mark C. and associates (1986) Multinationals and World Trade: Vertical Integration and the Division of Labour in World Industries, London: Allen & Unwin, xv + 401 pp.
- Peter J. Buckley and Mark C.Casson (1985) The Economic Theory of the Multinational Enterprise: Selected Papers, London: Macmillan, xii + 235pp.
- Casson, Mark C. (1983) Economics of Unemployment: An Historical Perspective, Cambridge, Massachusetts; MIT Press and Oxford: Blackwell.
- Casson, Mark C. (1982) The Entrepreneur: An Economic Theory, Oxford: Martin Robertson, [2nd. ed., Edward Elgar, 2003]
- Casson, Mark C. (1981) Unemployment: A Disequilibrium Approach, Oxford: Martin Robertson, xv + 263pp.
- Casson, Mark C. (1979) Youth Unemployment, London: Macmillan, xiii + 120pp.
- Casson, Mark C. (1979) Alternatives to the Multinational Enterprise, London: Macmillan xiii + 120pp
- Buckley, Peter J. and Mark C. Casson (1976) The Future of the Multinational Enterprise, London: Macmillan [25th Anniversary ed. 2001], 112pp.

This list excludes edited volumes and book series—for details of these see the external link below.
