= Niron Hashai =

Israeli business scholar

- ניראון חשאי
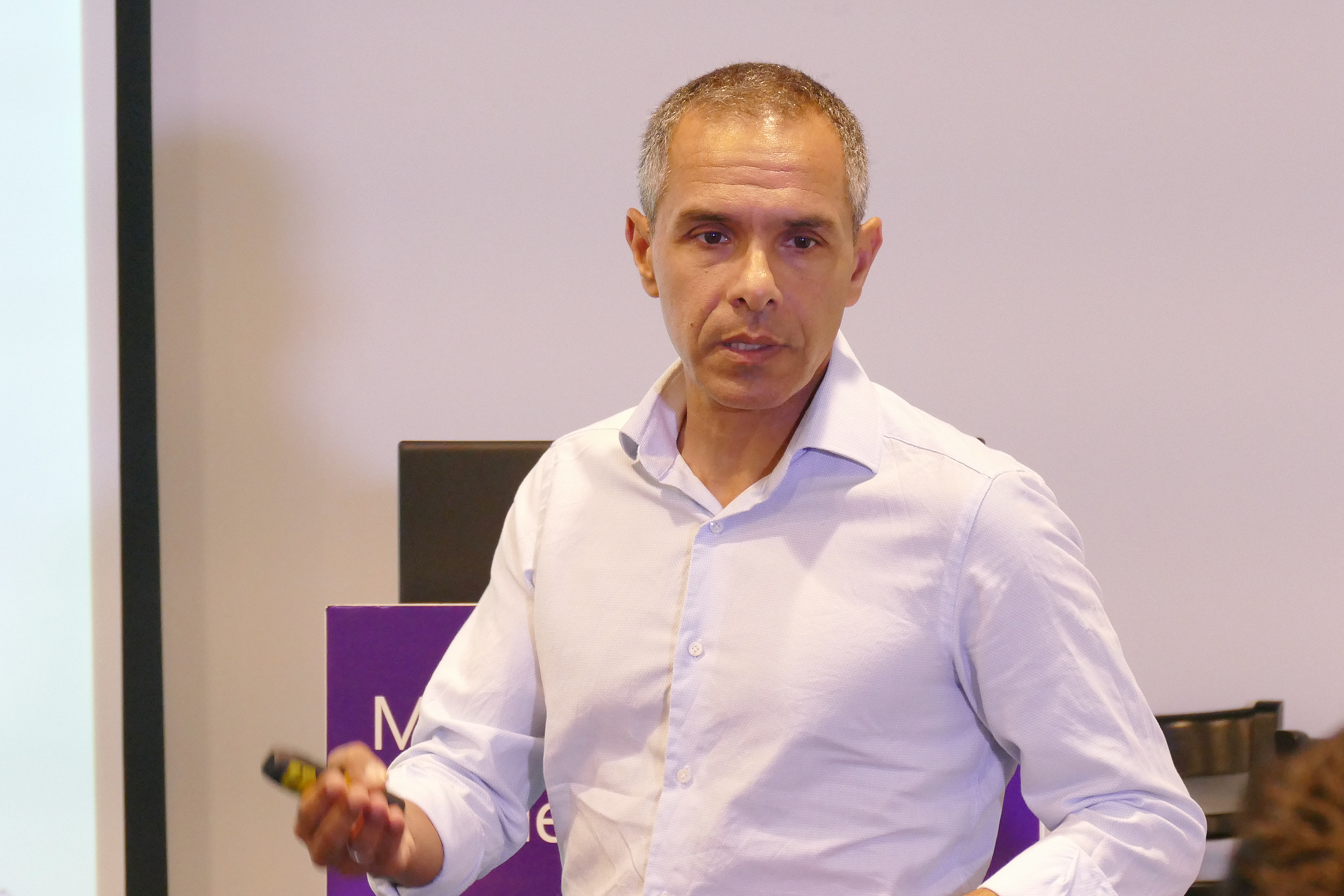
- Born: 1965 (age 60–61); Netanya, Israel

Academic background
- Education: The Technion (BSc); Tel Aviv University (MBA, PhD)

Academic work
- Institutions: Reichman University; Hebrew University of Jerusalem; New York University; University of Manchester
- Website: www.idc.ac.il/he/pages/faculty.aspx?username=nhashai

Niron Hashai (Hebrew: ניראון חשאי; born 1965) is an Israeli academic and Professor of International Business and Strategy at the Arison School of Business, Reichman University (formerly IDC Herzliya). He has served as the Dean of the Arison School of Business since 2021. Hashai is known for his research on multinational enterprises, the internationalization of high-technology firms, and strategic management.

== Early life and education ==
Hashai was born in Netanya, in 1965. Hashai earned a Bachelor of Science in Information Systems Engineering from the Computer Science Department at the Technion – Israel Institute of Technology in 1990. He received his MBA from the Faculty of Management at Tel Aviv University in 1994, followed by a PhD in International Business from the same institution in 2002.

== Academic career ==
Hashai began his academic career as a lecturer at the Bradford School of Management (University of Bradford) from 2001 to 2002 and at the School of Business Administration at the Hebrew University of Jerusalem from 2002 to 2008. He was promoted to Senior Lecturer at Hebrew University in 2008 and later became Associate Professor from 2012 to 2018. At Hebrew University, he served as Head of Strategy and Entrepreneurship from 2003 to 2017, Vice Dean for Innovation and Development from 2016 to 2017.

Since 2019, Hashai has been a Full Professor at the Arison School of Business, Reichman University. He is the Dean of the Arison School of Business (2021–present), Head of MBA Programs (2019–present), Co-Head of the Arison Honors Program (2025–present), and Chairman of the Arison ESG Center (2023–present).

== Research ==
Hashai's research focuses on the intersection of international business and strategic management, particularly the internationalization processes of high-technology firms, born global firms, multinational enterprise configurations, and the coevolution of technological knowledge and geographic scope. His work has been published in leading journals including the Journal of International Business Studies, Strategic Management Journal, Journal of Management, and Research Policy.

Hashai has received research grants from the Israel Science Foundation, the US-Israel Binational Science Foundation, the British Academy, and other institutions.

== Honors and awards ==
- AIB Aalto University "That's Interesting!" Award at the Academy of International Business Annual Conference (2023)
- John H. Dunning Research Fellowship at the University of Reading (2011–2012)
- Multiple Outstanding Teacher Awards from Hebrew University, Reichman University, and the College of Management
- Finalist for the Strategic Management Society Best Conference Paper Prize (2012, 2015)

== Published works ==
=== Books ===
- Ramamurti, R. & Hashai, N. (eds.), The Future of Foreign Direct Investment and the Multinational Enterprise, Emerald, 2011. ISBN 0857245554
- Almor T. & Hashai, N. (eds.), FDI, International Trade and the Economics of Peacemaking, The College of Management, Academic Studies, 2000.
- Asmussen, C.G., Hashai N. & Minbaeva, D. (Eds.), The Encyclopedia of International Strategic Management, Edward Elgar, 2024.

=== Selected Articles ===
- Hashai, N., Within-Industry Diversification and Firm Performance—An S-shaped Hypothesis. Strategic Management Journal, 36(9), 2015, pp. 1378–1400
- Hashai, N., Sequencing the Expansion of Geographic Scope and Foreign Operations of 'Born Global' Firms. Journal of International Business Studies, 42(8), 2011, pp. 994–1015
