= Richard Musgrave (economist) =

German-American economist (1910–2007)

- Born: December 14, 1910; Königstein im Taunus, Germany
- Died: January 15, 2007 (aged 96); Santa Cruz, California
- Education: Harvard University
- Scientific career
- Fields: Economics
- Workplaces: University of Michigan, UC Santa Cruz
- Doctoral advisor: Alvin Hansen

Richard Abel Musgrave (14 December 1910 – 15 January 2007) was an American economist of German heritage. His most cited work is The Theory of Public Finance (1959), described as "the first English-language treatise in the field," and "a major contribution to public finance thought."

== Biography ==
=== Early life ===
Musgrave was born in Königstein im Taunus, Germany, into the family of a writer and translator Curt Abel Musgrave, a chemist by profession. His paternal grandfather (professor of linguistics at the Berlin Humboldt Institute Carl Abel) and maternal grandmother were Jewish but converted to Christianity. He turned from the field of literature, with an interest in becoming a stage director, to philosophy and economics at the Ludwig-Maximilians-Universität München and Heidelberg University (Diplom-Volkswirt, 1933), then at Harvard University (Ph.D., 1937). After that, he spent four years as a research economist at the Federal Reserve and taught at several American universities, including the University of Michigan where he worked on his treatise from 1951 to 1959. He served as an advisor to the US government and returned to Harvard in 1965 as H.H. Burbank professor of Political Economy in the faculty of Arts and Sciences and the Law School. He was also editor of the Quarterly Journal of Economics. His book The Theory of Public Finance (1959) remains a leading theoretical work. Public Finance in Theory and Practice (1973), co-authored with his wife, Peggy Brewer Musgrave, was a leading textbook for many years.

=== Career in economics ===
Martin Feldstein is quoted in the New York Times obituary (Jan 20, 2007) "Richard Musgrave transformed economics in the 1950s and 1960s from a descriptive and institutional subject to one that used the tools of Microeconomics and Keynesian Macroeconomics to understand the effect of taxes." Musgrave published his seminal paper, "Voluntary Exchange Theory of Public Economy" in the Quarterly Journal of Economics in 1939. Paul Samuelson would later convert this from a positive theory to a normative theory.

It is from the 1939 paper "Voluntary Exchange Theory of Public Economy" that 'The Musgrave Three-Function Framework' originates. This framework is the suggestion that government activity should be separated into three functions or "branches," macroeconomic stabilization, income redistribution and resource allocation.

The stabilization branch is to assure the achievement of high employment and price stability, the distribution branch is to achieve an equitable distribution of income, and the allocation branch is to see that resources are used efficiently.

This conceptual division of the responsibilities of government allows us to narrow the scope of inquiry into tax assignment, by indicating which of the three functions are most appropriately assigned to various levels of government. The remainder of this section focuses on the implications of the three-branch framework for the assignment of revenue sources among levels of government, especially the assignment between the central government and second-tier governments.

In his paper, "A Multiple Theory of Budget Determination," published in FinanzArchiv 1957, Musgrave introduced the economic concept of merit good (and later, de-merit good). The concept has been extensively discussed elsewhere and been quite controversial in economic theory.

His background in the German, Austrian, Italian and Swedish schools of political economy, and the German contribution of Finanzwissenschaft-fiscal sociology, gave him a position to make a contribution to postwar government finance theory.

== Accolades ==
Musgrave was elected a Fellow in American Academy of Arts and Sciences, honorary member of the National Tax Association, and honorary President of the Institute of Public Finance (1978). Awarded the Frank E Seidman award in Political Economy (1981), honorary doctorates from Allegheny College, Heidelberg University, the University of Milan, the University of Michigan, and the Ludwig-Maximilians-Universität München (LMU Munich), he was a professor emeritus at Harvard until his death, and an adjunct Professor at the University of California, Santa Cruz.

Musgrave was designated a Distinguished Fellow by the American Economic Association in 1978, along with William S. Vickrey. An accompanying statement referred to him as "the undisputed father of modern Industrial Organization Economics."

The International Institute of Public Finance created an award in 2003 to commemorate the work conducted by Richard and his Peggy Brewer Musgrave.

He was awarded the Daniel M. Holland Medal by the National Tax Association in 1994. In 1999, the NTA named the NTJ Richard Musgrave Prize in his honor.

== Personal ==
He died on January 15, 2007, in Santa Cruz, California.

== Selected works ==
- Buchanan, James M. & Musgrave, Richard A. (1999). Public Finance and Public Choice: Two Contrasting Visions of the State. MIT Press. Description and chapter-preview links.
- Musgrave, Richard A. (1959). The Theory of Public Finance: A Study in Public Economy.
- Musgrave, Richard A. & Musgrave, Peggy B. (1973). Public Finance in Theory and Practice.
- Musgrave, R. A. (2008). "Public finance". The New Palgrave Dictionary of Economics. Abstract.
