= Carl Shoup =

American economist (1902–2000)

- Born: October 26, 1902; San Jose, California
- Died: March 23, 2000 (aged 97)

Academic background
- Education: Columbia University

Academic work
- Institutions: Columbia University
- Doctoral students: William Vickrey

Carl Sumner Shoup (October 26, 1902 – March 23, 2000) was an American economist and public finance expert. He is best known for leading the Shoup Mission of 1949–1950, tasked with revising the fiscal system of post-World War II Japan. He directly contributed to the tax codes of Canada, the United States, Japan, Europe, and South and Central America in the 1930s, '40s, and '50s. He retired as professor emeritus at Columbia University.

== Background ==
Carl Shoup was the son of railroad executive Paul Shoup and Rose Wilson Shoup. He and his wife Ruth had three children: Dale Shoup Mayer (1925–2019), Donald Sumner Shoup (1934–1989), and Paul Snedden Shoup. Ruth died in 1998, two years before her husband.

He was born in San Jose. He grew up in Los Altos, riding his horse to school.

== Government economic and tax policy ==
Co-directed, with fellow economist Roy Blough, the creation of the 1937 six-volume study "Report on the Federal Revenue System" of American taxes and potential reforms at the request of Treasury Secretary Henry Morgenthau Jr.

Carl Shoup has been identified as an intellectual father of the value-added tax (VAT). In particular, Shoup developed a taxonomy for describing the value added taxes and linking the administration of the VAT to the capabilities of the particular country.

In 1949–1950, during post-World War II fiscal reconstruction, Shoup led the Shoup Mission, a team of seven economists appointed by General MacArthur to revise the Japanese fiscal system. The resulting tax codes remain in use today.

In the 1950s, Shoup contributed to the overhaul of the tax systems in Venezuela, Cuba, and Liberia, and participated in the creation of the value-added tax systems in Canada and Europe.

== Publications ==
=== Books ===
- Public Taxation: April 1969 by Intervale Publishing Company ISBN 0932400027
- Ricardo on Taxation: September 1992 by Ashgate Publishing, Ltd ISBN 0751200603
- "Carl Shoup". JSTOR.
- Carl Sumner Shoup; Milton Friedman; Ruth Prince Mack (1943). Taxing to prevent inflation: techniques for estimating revenue requirements. Columbia University Press. ISBN 9780231930246.

=== Book chapters ===
- Cnossen, S., & Shoup, C. S. (1987). Coordination of value-added taxes. In Tax coordination in the European Community (pp. 59–84). Dordrecht: Springer Netherlands.

=== Articles ===
- Shoup, C. S. (1989). Rules for distributing a free government service among areas of a city. National Tax Journal, 42(2), 103-121. doi:10.1086/NTJ41788782
- Head, J. G., & Shoup, C. S. (1969). Public goods, private goods, and ambiguous goods. The Economic Journal, 79(315), 567-572. doi:10.2307/2230383
- Shoup, C. S. (1951). Some Considerations on the Incidence of the Corporation Income Tax. The Journal of Finance, 6(2), 187-196.
- Shoup, C. (1944). Postwar Federal Interest Charge. The American Economic Review, 34(2), 44-85.
- Shoup, C. (1940). The Taxation of Excess Profits I. Political Science Quarterly, 55(4), 535-555.

== Honors ==
- Shoup was awarded the Order of the Sacred Treasure twice by Japan's Emperor Hirohito. The order of the sacred treasure is an award from the country of Japan for long and meritorious service.
- Daniel M. Holland Medal, 1993
- McVicknar Professor Emeritus of Political Economy
- Columbia University Professorship in Honoring Carl Sumner Shoup Endowed by Toyota Motor Company
- Distinguished fellow of the American Economic Association
