= Foreign direct investment =

Cross-border investment giving a foreign investor lasting control of an enterprise

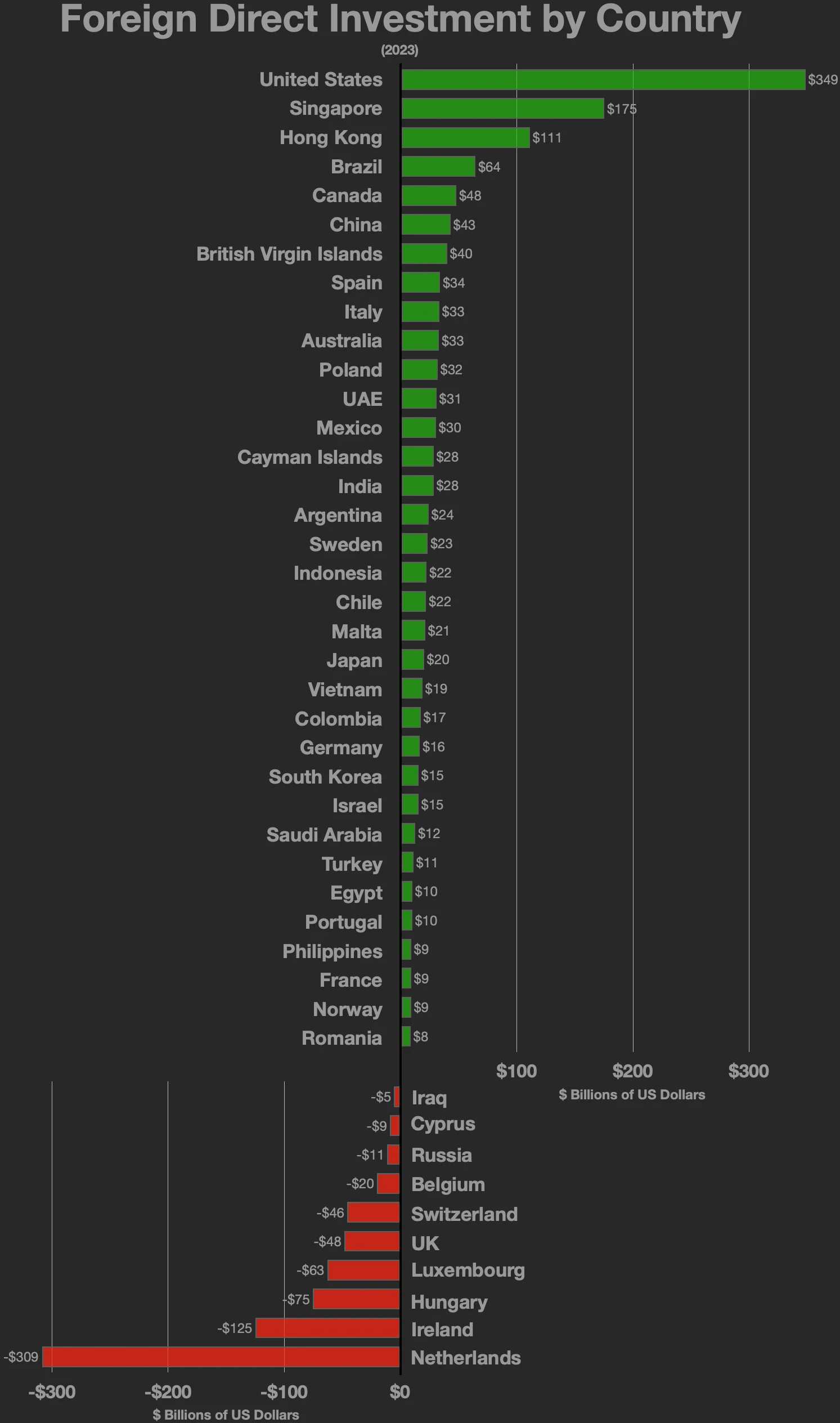
Foreign direct investment by country

Foreign direct investment (FDI) is an ownership stake in a company, made by a foreign investor, company, or government from another country. More specifically, it describes a controlling ownership of an asset in one country by an entity based in another country. The magnitude and extent of control, therefore, distinguishes it from a foreign portfolio investment or foreign indirect investment. Foreign direct investment includes expanding operations or purchasing a company in the target country.

== Definitions ==
Broadly, foreign direct investment includes mergers and acquisitions, building new facilities, reinvesting profits earned from overseas operations, and intracompany loans. A narrow definition employed by the World Bank considers foreign direct investment to be a lasting management interest of 10% or more of voting stock in an enterprise operating in an economy other than that of the investor. FDI is the sum of equity capital, long-term capital, and short-term capital as shown in the balance of payments. FDI usually involves participation in management, joint-venture, transfer of technology and expertise. Stock of FDI is the net (i.e., outward FDI minus inward FDI) cumulative FDI for any given period. Direct investment excludes investment through purchase of shares (if that purchase results in an investor controlling less than 10% of the shares of the company).

FDI, a subset of international factor movements, is characterized by controlling ownership of a business enterprise in one country by an entity based in another country. Foreign direct investment is distinguished from foreign portfolio investment, a passive investment in the securities of another country such as public stocks and bonds, by the element of "control". According to the Financial Times, "Standard definitions of control use the internationally agreed 10 percent threshold of voting shares, but this is a grey area as often a smaller block of shares will give control in widely held companies. Moreover, control of technology, management, even crucial inputs can confer de facto control."

== Theoretical background ==
Before Stephen Hymer's seminal work on FDI in 1960, no theory existed that dealt specifically with FDI. However, there are theories that dealt generally with foreign investments. Both Eli Heckscher (1919) and Bertil Ohlin (1933) developed the theory of foreign investments by using neoclassical economics and macroeconomic theory. Based on this principle, the differences in the costs of production of goods between two countries cause specialisation of jobs and trade between countries. Reasons for differences in costs of production can be explained by factor proportions theory. For example, countries with a greater proportion of labour will engage in labor-intensive industries while countries that have a greater proportion of capital will engage in capital-intensive industries. However, such a theory makes the assumption that there is perfect competition, there is no movement of labour across country borders, and the multinational companies assumes risk neutral preferences. In 1967, Weintraub tested this hypothesis by collecting United States data on rate of return and flow of capital. However, the data failed to support this hypothesis. Data from surveys on the motivation of FDI also failed to support this hypothesis.

Intrigued by the motivations behind large foreign investments made by corporations from the United States of America, Hymer developed a framework that went beyond the existing theories, explaining why this phenomenon occurred, since he considered that the previously mentioned theories could not explain foreign investment and its motivations. Facing the challenges of his predecessors, Hymer focused his theory on filling the gaps regarding international investment. The theory proposed by the author approaches international investment from a different and more firm-specific point of view. As opposed to traditional macroeconomics-based theories of investment, Hymer states that there is a difference between mere capital investment, otherwise known as portfolio investment, and direct investment. The difference between the two, which will become the cornerstone of his whole theoretical framework, is the issue of control, meaning that with direct investment firms are able to obtain a greater level of control than with portfolio investment. Furthermore, Hymer proceeds to criticize the neoclassical theories, stating that the theory of capital movements cannot explain international production. Moreover, he clarifies that FDI is not necessarily a movement of funds from a home country to a host country, and that it is concentrated on particular industries within many countries. In contrast, if interest rates were the main motive for international investment, FDI would include many industries within fewer countries.

Another observation made by Hymer went against what was maintained by the neoclassical theories: foreign direct investment is not limited to investment of excess profits abroad. In fact, foreign direct investment can be financed through loans obtained in the host country, payments in exchange for equity (patents, technology, machinery etc.), and other methods.

The main determinants of FDI is side as well as growth prospectus of the economy of the country when FDI is made. Hymer proposed some more determinants of FDI due to criticisms, along with assuming market and imperfections. These are as follows:

1. Firm-specific advantages: Once domestic investment was exhausted, a firm could exploit its advantages linked to market imperfections, which could provide the firm with market power and competitive advantage. Further studies attempted to explain how firms could monetize these advantages in the form of licenses.
2. Removal of conflicts: Conflict arises if a firm is already operating in foreign market or looking to expand its operations within the same market. He proposes that the solution for this hurdle arose in the form of collusion, sharing the market with rivals or attempting to acquire a direct control of production. However, it must be taken into account that a reduction in conflict through acquisition of control of operations will increase the market imperfections.
3. Propensity to formulate an internationalization strategy to mitigate risk: According to his position, firms are characterized with 3 levels of decision making: the day to day supervision, management decision coordination and long-term strategy planning and decision making. The extent to which a company can mitigate risk depends on how well a firm can formulate an internationalization strategy taking these levels of decision into account.

Hymer's importance in the field of international business and foreign direct investment stems from him being the first to theorize about the existence of multinational enterprises (MNE) and the reasons behind FDI beyond macroeconomic principles, his influence on later scholars and theories in international business, such as the OLI (ownership, location and internationalization) theory by John Dunning and Christos Pitelis which focuses more on transaction costs. Moreover, "the efficiency-value creation component of FDI and MNE activity was further strengthened by two other major scholarly developments in the 1990s: the resource-based (RBV) and evolutionary theories." In addition, some of his predictions later materialized, for example the power of supranational bodies such as International Monetary Fund or the World Bank that increases inequalities, a phenomenon the United Nations Sustainable Development Goal 10 aims to address.

== Types of FDI ==
The types of FDI investments can be classified from the perspective of the investor/source country and the host/destination country. From the investor perspective, it can be divided into horizontal FDI, vertical FDI, and conglomerate FDI. From the perspective of the destination country, FDI can be divided into import-substituting, export-increasing, and government initiated FDI. Horizontal FDI arises when a multination corporation duplicates its home country industry chain into the destination country to produce similar goods. Vertical FDI takes place when a multinational corporation acquires a company to exploit the natural resources in the destination country (backward vertical FDI) or by acquiring distribution outlets to market its products in the destination country (forward vertical FDI). Conglomerate FDI is the combination between horizontal and vertical FDI.

Platform FDI is the foreign direct investment from a source country into a destination country for the purpose of exporting to a third country.

== Methods ==
The foreign direct investor may acquire voting power of an enterprise in an economy through any of the following methods:

- by incorporating a wholly owned subsidiary or company anywhere
- by acquiring shares in an associated enterprise
- through a merger or an acquisition of an unrelated enterprise
- participating in an equity joint venture with another investor or enterprise

=== Forms of FDI incentives ===
Foreign direct investment incentives may take the following forms:

- low corporate tax and individual income tax rates
- tax holidays
- other types of tax concessions
- preferential tariffs
- special economic zones
- EPZ – export processing zones
- bonded warehouses
- maquiladoras
- investment financial subsidies
- free land or land subsidies
- relocation & expatriation
- infrastructure subsidies
- R&D support
- energy
- derogation from regulations (usually for very large projects)
- Stronger Intellectual Property Rights

== FDI ==
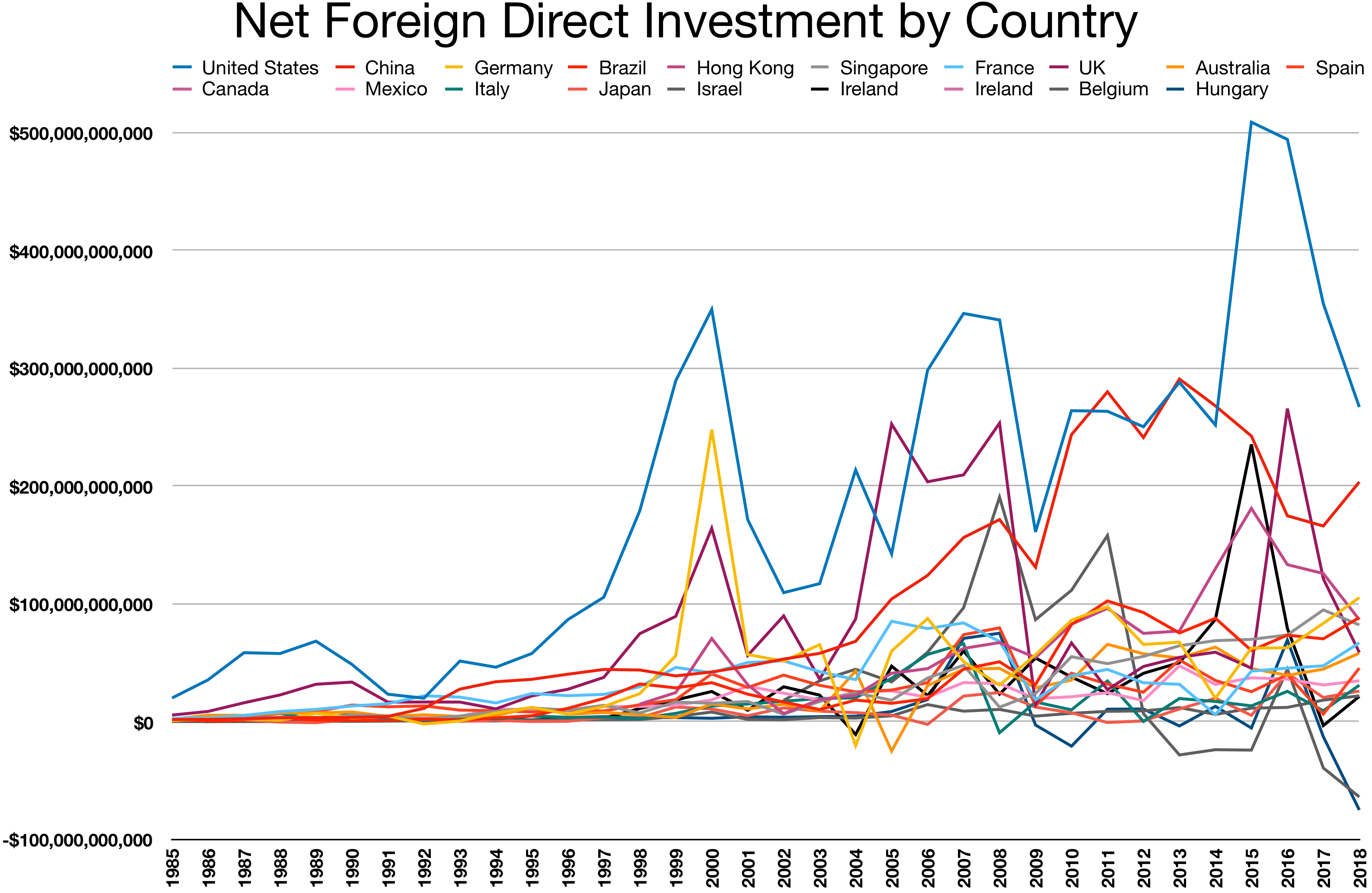

Foreign Direct Investment tends to increase with the democracy index of the country for countries where the share of natural resources in total exports is low. For countries with high natural resource export share, the FDI tends to decrease with a higher democracy index.

A 2010 meta-analysis of the effects of foreign direct investment (FDI) on local firms in developing and transition countries suggests that foreign investment robustly increases local productivity growth.

From 1992 until at least 2023, the United States and China have been the top two destinations for FDI.

=== Europe ===
According to a study conducted by EY, France was in 2020 the largest foreign direct investment recipient in Europe, ahead of the UK and Germany. EY attributed this as a "direct result of President Macron's reforms of labor laws and corporate taxation, which were well received by domestic and international investors alike." Moreover, 24 countries of the EU made an investment into the Armenian economy since the year of Armenian Independence.

European scale-ups that achieve significant growth are frequently acquired by foreign entities, with over 60% of these acquisitions involving buyers from outside the EU, predominantly from the United States.

=== China ===
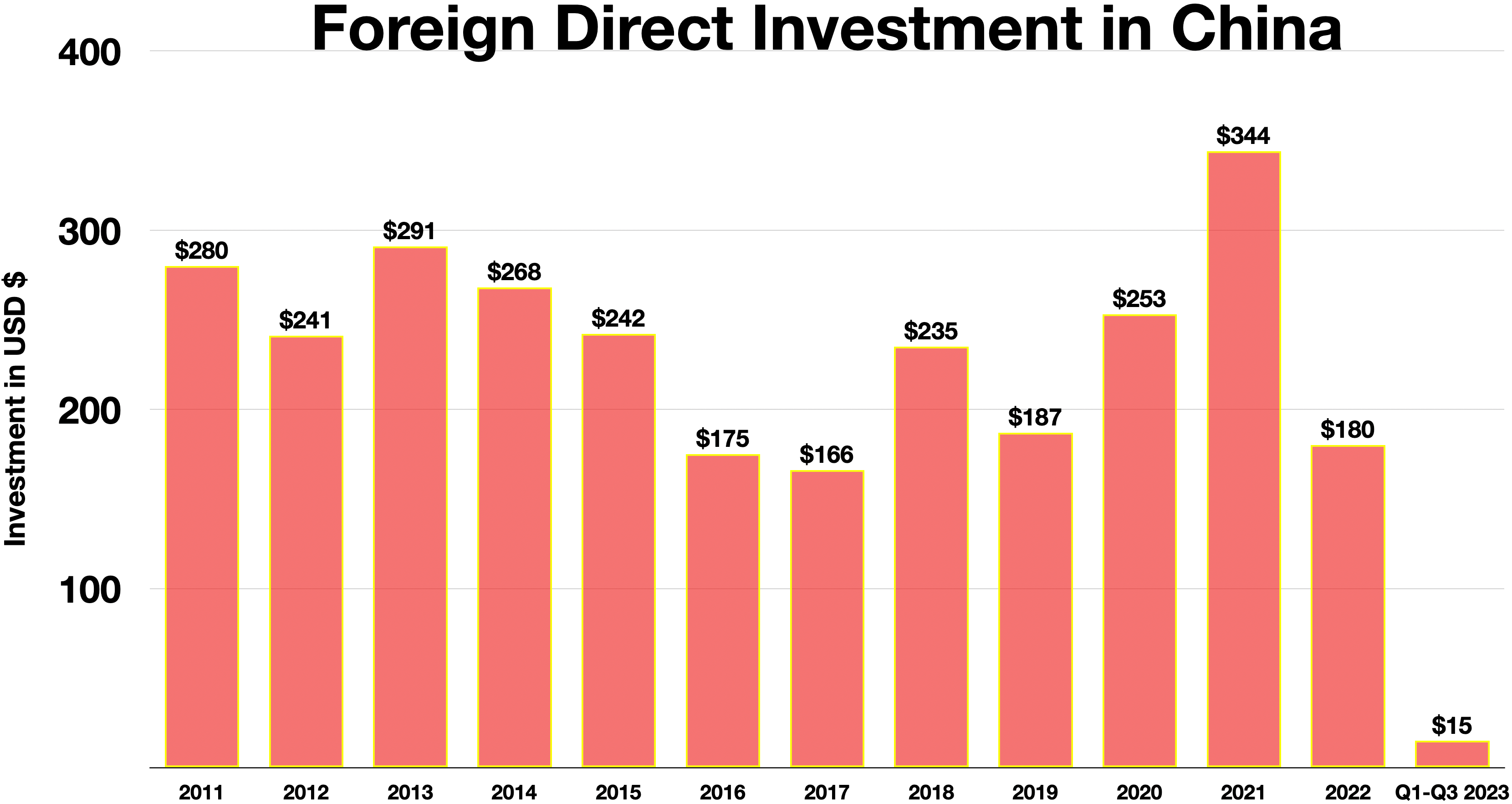
Foreign direct investment in China

FDI in China, also known as RFDI (renminbi foreign direct investment), largely began in the late 1970s due to the reform and opening-up economic policies of paramount leader Deng Xiaoping. Foreign direct investment increased considerably in the 2000s, reaching $19.1 billion in the first six months of 2012, making China the largest recipient of foreign direct investment at that point of time and topping the United States which had $17.4 billion of FDI. In 2013 the FDI flow into China was $24.1 billion, resulting in a 34.7% market share of FDI into the Asia-Pacific region. By contrast, FDI out of China in 2013 was $8.97 billion, 10.7% of the Asia-Pacific share. As a result of the Great Recession, FDI fell by over one-third in 2009 but rebounded in 2010. China implemented the Foreign Investment Law in 2020. FDI in China dropped to a 30-year-low in 2024, which was attributed to anti-espionage crackdowns from China and a rise in sanctions for industries like semiconductors.

=== India ===
Foreign investment was introduced in 1991 under Foreign Exchange Management Act (FEMA), driven by then finance minister Manmohan Singh. India disallowed overseas corporate bodies (OCB) to invest in India. India imposes cap on equity holding by foreign investors in various sectors, current FDI in aviation and insurance sectors is limited to a maximum of 49%. In 2015, India emerged as top FDI destination surpassing China and the US. India attracted FDI of $31 billion compared to $28 billion and $27 billion of China and the US respectively.

=== Iran ===
Iranian companies saw some improvement of FDI investment as of 2015 because of JCPOA. Some investment is much needed in Iranian oil industry. By 2023 due to condition of Iranian economy FDI had decreased by 82%.

=== Ireland ===
Ireland under the Celtic Tiger experienced large amounts of foreign direct investment, largely from American multinational corporations. However, according to one study by a Hungarian conservative think thank, the Danube Institute, foreign direct investment "may produce rising wealth; but left to themselves, they lead to a general deterioration of non-economic life". According to this study, this phenomenon reputedly contributed towards a "decline in religion and other community-based structures" in Ireland.

=== United States ===
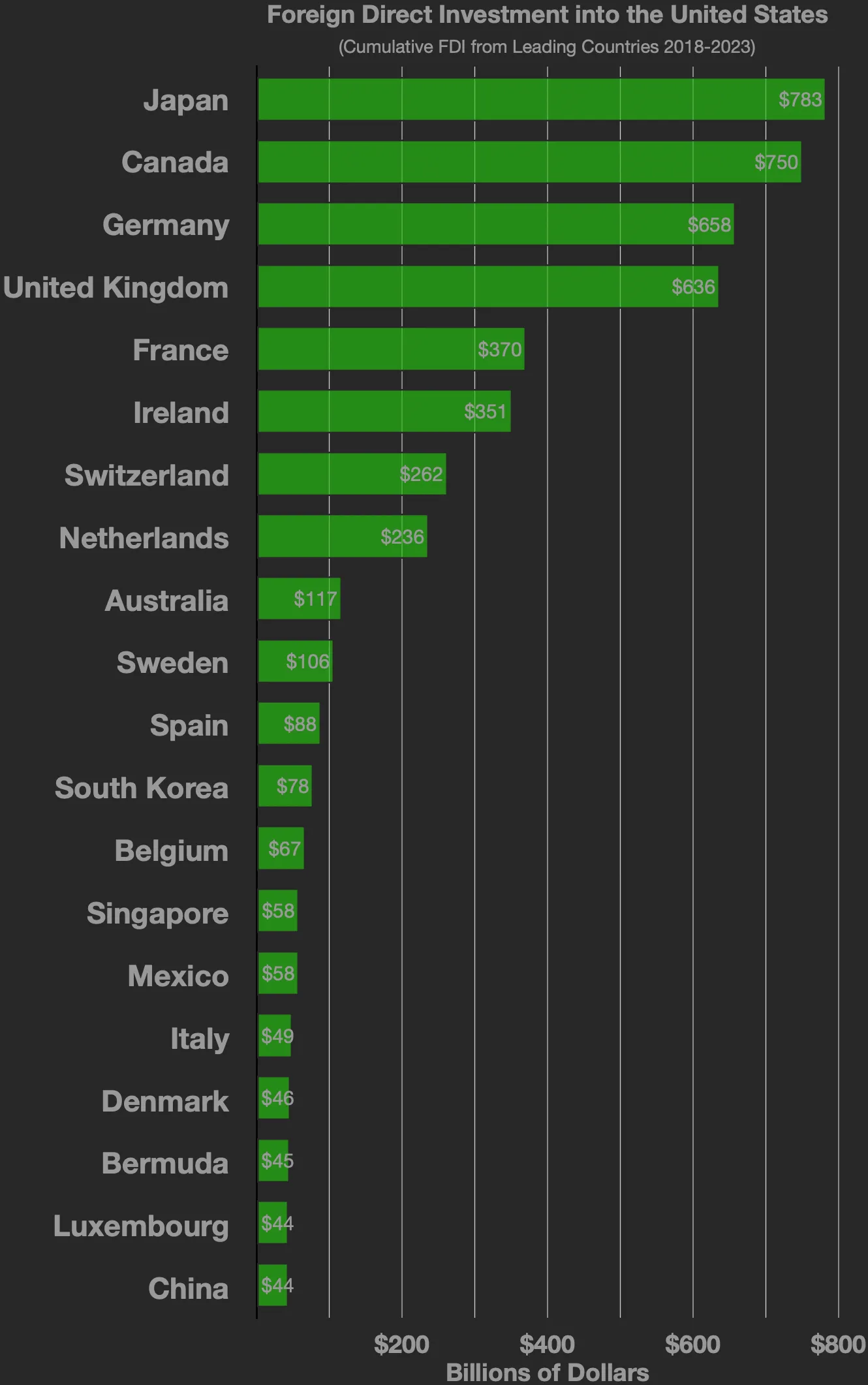
Cumulative foreign direct investment into the United States by country from 2018—2023

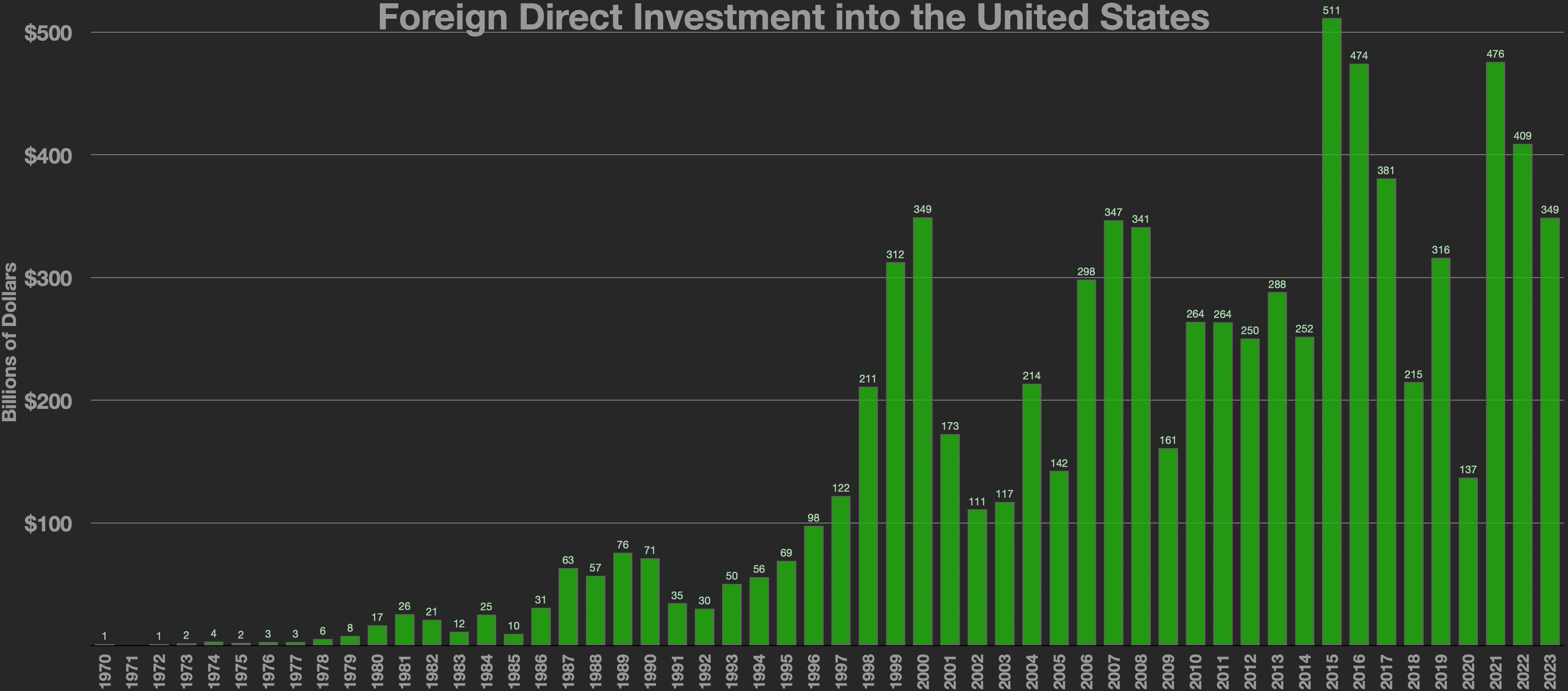
Foreign direct investment into the United States by year

Broadly speaking, the United States has a fundamentally "open economy" and low barriers to FDI.

The foreign direct investment position in the United States on a historical-cost basis, a cumulative measure rather than an annual flow, was $5.86 trillion at the end of 2025, an increase of $266.0 billion from 2024. Measured by the country of the foreign parent, Japan had the largest position at $776.3 billion, followed by the Netherlands at $751.8 billion, Canada at $747.3 billion, and the United Kingdom at $738.3 billion. Manufacturing accounted for 42.8% of the total position, or $2.51 trillion. Of FDI in the United States in 2010, 84% came from or through eight countries: Switzerland, the United Kingdom, Japan, France, Germany, Luxembourg, the Netherlands, and Canada.

A 2008 study by the Federal Reserve Bank of San Francisco indicated that foreigners hold greater shares of their investment portfolios in the United States if their own countries have less developed financial markets, an effect whose magnitude decreases with income per capita. Countries with fewer capital controls and greater trade with the United States also invest more in U.S. equity and bond markets.

White House data reported in 2011 found that a total of 5.7 million workers were employed at facilities highly dependent on foreign direct investors. Thus, about 13% of the American manufacturing workforce depended on such investments. The average pay of said jobs was found as around $70,000 per worker, over 30% higher than the average pay across the entire U.S. workforce.

President Barack Obama said in 2012, "In a global economy, the United States faces increasing competition for the jobs and industries of the future. Taking steps to ensure that we remain the destination of choice for investors around the world will help us win that competition and bring prosperity to our people."

In September 2013, the United States House of Representatives voted to pass the Global Investment in American Jobs Act of 2013 (H.R. 2052; 113th Congress), a bill which would direct the United States Department of Commerce to "conduct a review of the global competitiveness of the United States in attracting foreign direct investment". Supporters of the bill argued that increased foreign direct investment would help job creation in the United States.

=== Eurasia ===
In November 2021, a report from the Eurasian Development Bank revealed that Kazakhstan boasted the highest FDI stock value from the Eurasian Economic Union (EAEU) with $11.2 billion by 2020 and an increase of over $3 billion since 2017.

=== Armenia ===
According to the World Bank, Armenia takes the first place in terms of FDI appeal among Commonwealth of Independent States. The Armenian government has created a favorable environment for foreign investments by introducing new laws and conditions. The country was named '"The Caucasian Tiger" because of the substantial economic growth in observed in the early 2000s. Some of the measures to attract FDI include free economic zones (FEZ) with relaxed laws, also, profit tax, VAT, and property tax benefits. In particular, The Most Favored Nation (MFN) and National Treatment regimes are in effect, and the government has an "open door" policy with ongoing legal protection to encourage international investment. A highly beneficial business environment is guaranteed for international investors under the law "On Foreign Investments." Additionally, it guarantees the protection of foreign capital invested in Armenian businesses and permits limitless involvement. Research shows that Cyprus, Germany, Netherlands, UK, and France have made a total investment of US$1.4 billion in the period 2007–2013. Between 40%-53% of all foreign investments in Armenia between 1988 and 2022 originate from Russia.

=== Latin America ===
The European Investment Bank has invested in Latin America since 1993, and as of 2023, backed 150 projects in 15 countries with more than €13 billion. In 2020, the European Investment Bank provided €516 million in finance in Latin America and the Caribbean, contributing to sustainable and equitable development as well as climate action. All EIB loans in the area were made to public sector borrowers, mostly national development banks and a few new partners. In 2020 the European Investment Bank provided €462 million in Latin America, of which €278 million was due to the COVID-19 pandemic. Since 2022, the bank has signed 15 Global Gateway contracts in this region for a combined €1.7 billion, and it anticipates investments totaling about €4.6 billion over the next few years.

== See also ==
- Bilateral investment treaty
- Foreign direct investment and the environment
- Foreign exchange controls
- Investment promotion agency
- List of countries by FDI abroad
- List of countries by received FDI
- Foreign ownership
