= Rajneesh Narula =

British economist and academic

Rajneesh Narula OBE, FRSA
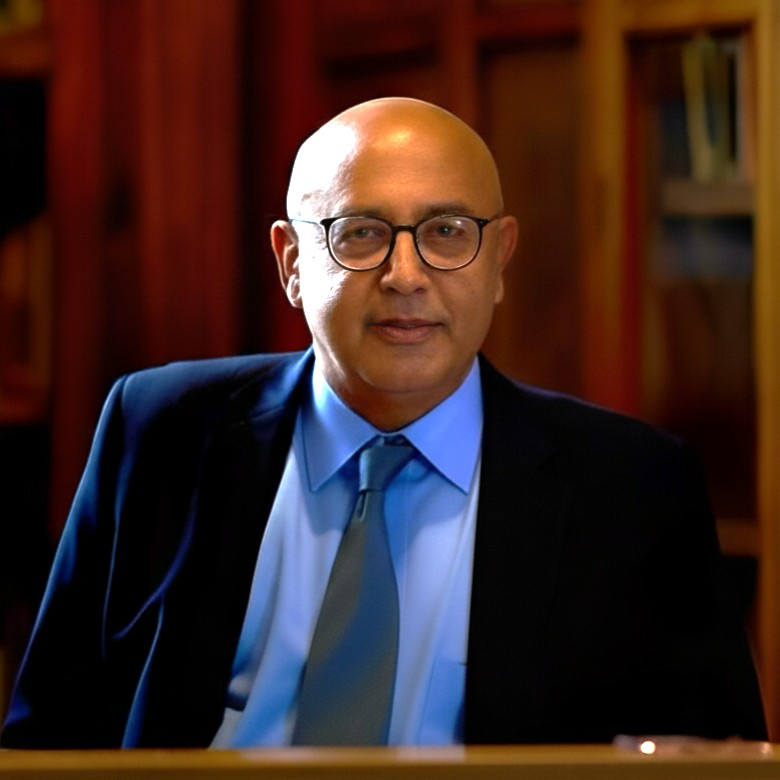
- Born: 29 April 1963 (age 63)

Academic background
- Education: Rutgers University

Academic work
- Discipline: International Business; Development Studies; Innovation Policy; Alliances
- Institutions: Henley Business School, University of Reading, UK
- Awards: OBE, FRSA
- Website: Information at IDEAS / RePEc

Rajneesh Narula (born 29 April 1963), is a Dutch economist and academic. He is the John H. Dunning Chair of International Business Regulation at the Henley Business School, University of Reading, UK, where he also serves as the Director of the Dunning Centre for International Business and the Dunning Africa Centre.

In 2018, he was appointed an Honorary Officer of the Most Excellent Order of the British Empire (OBE). The honour is in recognition of his Services to Business Research. He was elected a Fellow of the Royal Society of Arts, Manufactures, and Commerce (FRSA) in 2015.

He hold honorary appointment at Oxford University and the University of Urbino and has held honorary appointments at United Nations University-MERIT.

== Early life and education ==
Narula completed his early education in Nigeria, most notably at Barewa College where he was a classmate of Nasir Ahmad el-Rufai, and Katsina College of Arts, Science and Technology. He earned his BEng (Hons) in Electrical Engineering from Ahmadu Bello University in Zaria, Nigeria, in 1983, and later attended Rutgers University in New Jersey, USA, where he obtained his MBA (1988) and his PhD (1993).

== Academic career ==
Prior to his career in academia, Narula worked as an engineer at the Nigerian College of Aviation Technology and later as a planning analyst at IBM Asia/Pacific headquarters in Hong Kong. He transitioned into full-time academia, holding faculty positions at Rutgers University, the University of Maastricht, the BI Norwegian School of Management, the University of Oslo, and the Copenhagen Business School before joining the University of Reading.

In 2004, he was appointed the John H. Dunning Chair of International Business Regulation at the Henley Business School, University of Reading. He serves as the Director of the John H. Dunning Centre for International Business.

=== Editorial roles ===
Narula has held prominent editorial roles within the field's leading journals and serves on the editorial boards of more than a dozen publications. He is currently the Perspectives editor of the Journal of International Business Policy and has served as the Editor-in-Chief of Journal of Industrial and Business Economics (2021-2023), and an editor for the Journal of International Business Studies (2016–2023). Prior to this, he was the editor-in-chief of both the Multinational Business Review from 2014 to 2016 and the European Journal of Development Research from 2009 to 2013. He was appointed Editor-in-Chief of the

== Policy and advisory contributions ==
Narula regularly acts as an advisor and consultant on international investment, industrial policy, and cross-border innovation systems for major international organizations, government agencies, and regional communities. His global advisory portfolio includes work for the European Commission, the Organisation for Economic Co-operation and Development (OECD), the United Nations Conference on Trade and Development (UNCTAD), the United Nations Industrial Development Organization (UNIDO), and the World Bank. He has held honorary academic appointments at several international institutions, including United Nations University-MERIT, Oxford University, and the BI Norwegian School of Business.

=== Nigeria ===
Narula's policy frameworks extensively feature the economic and industrial development of Nigeria. His research and economic consulting focus on national technological accumulation, the formalization of the informal sector, and the domestic private sector's role in driving employment. From 2021 to 2025, he served as a consultant and policy advisor to Malam Nasir El-Rufai's Kaduna State government, advising the Planning and Budget Commission on structural economic reforms, fiscal policy, petroleum subsidy removal, exchange rate unification, and the mitigation of multiple taxation systems to support small and medium enterprises (SMEs). As a policy commentator, he contributes analysis on Nigeria’s macroeconomic frameworks to national and international media, including written pieces for Nigeria's financial daily, BusinessDay.

=== South Africa and the B20 ===
Narula maintains an active public and academic engagement profile within South Africa and the wider continent, focusing on regional integration and sustainable industrial development. Under his leadership as director, the Dunning Africa Centre at Henley Business School Africa established its monthly flagship webinar series, titled "What Really Matters for African Business." Through this digital forum, Narula regularly hosts global experts, policy makers, and corporate leaders to discuss critical economic levers, including foreign direct investment (FDI) strategies, market fragmentation, and the implementation challenges of the African Continental Free Trade Area (AfCFTA). His advisory work on emerging-market dynamics extends to the B20 forum —the official business dialogue community of the G20—where his research on global value chain resilience and structural development helps inform policy recommendations aimed at building collaborative public-private partnerships and fostering cross-border trade. He continues to advise the Central Bank of Nigeria and other national government organisations on an ad-hoc basis.

=== Norway and the European Union ===
Narula's research on industrial competitiveness and cross-border innovation systems heavily informs regional economic policy within Europe, particularly concerning the European Union and the Nordic region. He has served as a frequent advisor and expert consultant to the European Commission, contributing analysis to institutional frameworks governing European SME development, R&D collaborations, and the economic impacts of cross-border value chain disruptions. Narula's work has specifically addressed national technological accumulation and the systemic challenges faced by domestic industries. His collaborative research on the Nordic region includes empirical studies examining how varying integration schemes influence the operational scope, capabilities, and strategic investments of multinational subsidiaries.

== Research and impact ==
According to Google Scholar, Narula is ranked among the most-cited academic authors worldwide in the fields of international business, emerging markets, and the economics of innovation. His published work comprises over 200 articles, chapters, and 13 books. His research focus targets the intersection of corporate strategy and national competitiveness, specifically mapping the paradigms of FDI-assisted development alongside long-term collaborators John H. Dunning and Sanjaya Lall.

== Public engagement and media commentary ==
Narula is a regular commentator on global economic policy, international trade, and the activities of multinational enterprises for major news outlets. He has frequently provided expert analysis and broadcast interviews on platforms such as BBC World News, BBC One’s The Briefing, Sky News, CGTN, and TRT World News, addressing topics including international tariff disputes, global value chain disruptions, and the economic implications of the US-China trade war.

His commentary and opinion pieces on regional economic development and industrial policy have been featured in international press and radio outlets, including Nigeria’s BusinessDay, South Africa’s Moneyweb, BBC Radio 1, and Radio Berkshire.

Beyond broadcast media, Narula participates extensively in public-facing academic outreach, global webinars, and digital symposia. He regularly delivers public lectures and keynote addresses at international forums, including events hosted by the Academy of International Business (AIB). His digital and online contributions include hosting and paneling policy webinars that translate complex research regarding global mobility, economic integration schemes—particularly within the African continent—and the intersection of corporate strategy with national competitiveness for broader managerial and policy audiences.

== Selected publications ==
According to Google Scholar, Narula is ranked among the most-cited academic authors worldwide in the fields of international business, emerging markets, the economics of innovation, and economic development. His total citation count exceeds 25,000, with an h-index of 69.

He is the author or editor of 15 books, including Globalization and Technology (Polity Press), Multinationals and Industrial Competitiveness (with John Dunning, Edward Elgar), Understanding FDI-assisted Economic Development (with Sanjaya Lall, Routledge), and Multinationals on the Periphery (with Gabriel Benito, Palgrave). He is also the co-author of the textbook International Business (with Simon Collinson and Alan Rugman), which is in its ninth edition. His 2003 book, Globalization and Technology, has been translated and published in Chinese and Arabic.

=== Books ===
- Collinson, S.; Narula, R.; Rugman, A. M. (2024). International Business (9th ed.). Pearson. ISBN 978-1292437651.
- Lall, S.; Narula, R. (2006). Understanding FDI-Assisted Economic Development. Routledge. ISBN 978-0415396820.
- Dunning, J. H.; Narula, R. (2004). Multinationals and Industrial Competitiveness: A New Agenda. Edward Elgar. ISBN 978-1843766643.
- Narula, R. (2003). Globalisation and Technology: Interdependence, Innovation Systems and Industrial Policy. Polity Press. ISBN 978-0745624563.
- Dunning, J. H.; Narula, R. (1996). Foreign Direct Investment and Governments: Catalysts for Economic Restructuring. Routledge. ISBN 978-0415148337.
- Narula, R. (1996). Multinational Investment and Economic Structure: Globalisation and Competitiveness. Routledge. ISBN 978-0415131230.

=== Selected journal articles ===
- Larsen, M. M.; Narula, R. (2026). "Should multinationals care about development? Rethinking global strategy in an unequal world". Global Strategy Journal. doi:10.1002/gsj.1436.
- Minbaeva, D.; Narula, R.; Phene, A.; Fitzsimmons, S. (2025). "Beyond global mobility: how human capital shapes the MNE in the 21st century". Journal of International Business Studies. 56 (2): 136–150. doi:10.1057/s41267-024-00761-6.
- van der Straaten, K.; Narula, R.; Giuliani, E. (2023). "The multinational enterprise, development, and the inequality of opportunities: A research agenda". Journal of International Business Studies. 54 (9): 1623–1640. doi:10.1057/s41267-023-00625-y.
- Pineli, A.; Narula, R. (2023). "Industrial policy matters: the co-evolution of economic structure, trade, and FDI in Brazil and Mexico, 2000–2015". Journal of Industrial and Business Economics. 50 (2): 399–444. doi:10.1007/s40812-023-00262-4.
- Kano, L.; Narula, R.; Surdu, I. (2022). "Global Value Chain Resilience: Understanding the Impact of Managerial Governance Adaptations". California Management Review. 64 (2): 123–145. doi:10.1177/00081256211066839.
- Narula, R. (2019). "Enforcing higher labor standards within developing country value chains". Journal of International Business Studies. 50 (9): 1622–1635. doi:10.1057/s41267-019-00268-w.
- Narula, R. (2004). "R&D collaboration by SMEs: new opportunities and limitations in the face of globalisation". Technovation. 24 (2): 153–161. doi:10.1016/S0166-4972(02)00045-7.
- Narula, R. (2002). "Innovation systems and 'Inertia' in R&D location: Norwegian firms and the role of systemic lock-in". Research Policy. 31 (5): 795–816. doi:10.1016/S04166-4972(01)00067-9.
- Narula, R.; Dunning, J. H. (2000). "Industrial development, globalization and multinational enterprises: New realities for developing countries". Oxford Development Studies. 28 (2): 141–167. doi:10.1080/713688313.

== Awards and honors ==
- Officer of the Most Excellent Order of the British Empire (OBE) (2018) – Appointed in the 2018 New Year Honours list for outstanding services to business research.
- Fellow of the Royal Society of Arts, Manufactures, and Commerce (FRSA) (2015) – Elected for his impactful global research contributions.

=== Honorary appointments ===
In addition to his formal accolades, he holds or has held honorary academic positions at leading global institutions:

- University of Oxford – Honorary appointment at the Technology and Management Centre for Development (TMCD).
- United Nations University-MERIT (Maastricht) – Honorary Professor / Professorial Fellow.
- BI Norwegian Business School – Visiting / Honorary Professor.
- University of Urbino (Italy) – Honorary appointment.
- Simon Fraser University (Canada) – Honorary appointment.
