= Eclectic paradigm =

Economic theory

The eclectic paradigm, also known as the OLI model or OLI framework (OLI stands for Ownership, Location, and Internalization), is a theory in economics. It is a further development of the internalization theory and published by John H. Dunning in 1979. Modern trade theory incorporates this paradigm using the Grossman-Hart-Moore theory of the firm

- Ownership advantages specific advantages refer to the competitive advantages of the enterprises seeking to engage in foreign direct investment (FDI). The greater the competitive advantages of the investing firms, the more they are likely to engage in their foreign production.
- Location advantages Locational attractions refer to the alternative countries or regions, for undertaking the value adding activities of multinational enterprises (MNEs). The more the immobile, natural or created resources, which firms need to use jointly with their own competitive advantages, favor a presence in a foreign location, the more firms will choose to augment or exploit their specific advantages by engaging in FDI.
- Internalization advantages Firms may organize the creation and exploitation of their core competencies. The greater the net benefits of internalizing cross-border intermediate product markets, the more likely a firm will prefer to engage in foreign production itself rather than license the right to do so.
