= Internalization theory =

Internalization theory is a branch of economics that is used to analyse international business behaviour. Internalization theory focuses on imperfections in intermediate product markets. Two main kinds of intermediate product are distinguished: knowledge flows linking research and development (R&D) to production, and flows of components and raw materials from an upstream production facility to a downstream one. Most applications of the theory focus on knowledge flow. Proprietary knowledge is easier to appropriate when intellectual property rights such as patents and trademarks are weak. Even with strong protections firms protect their knowledge through secrecy. Instead of licensing their knowledge to independent local producers, firms exploit it themselves in their own production facilities. In effect, they internalise the market in knowledge within the firm. The theory claims the internalization leads to larger, more multinational enterprises, because knowledge is a public good. Development of a new technology is concentrated within the firm and the knowledge then transferred to other facilities.

== Refinements ==
Internalization occurs only when firms perceive the benefits to exceed the costs. When internalization leads to foreign investment the firm may incur political and commercial risks due to unfamiliarity with the foreign environment. These are known as 'costs of doing business abroad', arising from the 'liability of foreignness'. When such costs are high a firm may license or outsource production to an independent firm; or it may produce at home and export to the country instead.

Firms without special knowledge may become multinational to internalise supplies of components or raw materials in order to guarantee quality or continuity of supply, or for tax advantages from transfer pricing.

== Variants ==
Buckley and Casson (1976) was a seminal work. Two Canadian economists, Stephen Hymer and John McManus, independently noted the relevance of internalization, and their contribution is the subject of debate. Alan M. Rugman linked internalization theory to his earlier work on market imperfections, applying it empirically in a North American context. Jean-Francois Hennart subsequently developed a variant of the theory that emphasised the interplay of headquarters authority and local autonomy within the firm. Internalization theory is also closely related to Stephen Magee's appropriability theory.

== Controversies ==
Internalization theory was used by John Harry Dunning as one of the components of his eclectic paradigm or OLI model. Dunning referred to knowledge as an 'ownership advantage' and claimed that ownership advantage was necessary for a firm to become a multinational. This was disputed by internalization theorists on the grounds that if quality control and transfer pricing are sufficient, then ownership advantage cannot be necessary. Dunning argued that the firm's ability to internalise could also be described as an ownership advantage, which led internalization theorists to suggest that his concept of ownership advantage had become tautological. Internalization theory is related to transaction cost theory through common dependence on the seminal work of Ronald Coase. They are not the same however. Internalization theory focuses on links between R&D and production whereas transaction cost theory focuses on links between one production facility and another. Transaction cost theory typically attributes market imperfections to bounded rationality and 'lock in', whilst internalization theory emphasises asymmetric information and weaknesses in property rights. Transaction cost theory is typically applied in a domestic context, whereas internalization theory was developed specifically for an international context.

== Links to international business theory ==
Prior to internalization theory, the study of international business was largely focused on the environment, and in particular the economic, financial, political and cultural dimensions of doing business abroad. Internalization theory provided a theory of the international firm and thus augmented the international business field by demonstrating the interaction between the external environmental and the internal knowledge flows between MNE parent firm and subsidiaries. This interaction between external country-specific advantages (CSAs) and internal MNE firm-specific advantages (FSAs) is the nexus for strategic managerial international business decisions.

== Policy implications ==
The view that multinationals transfer technology and not capital provided a major boost to the process of globalisation. The United Nations Conference on Trade and Development (UNCTAD) was strongly influenced by internalization theory and the eclectic paradigm. It persuaded political leaders to encourage inward investment as a source of the new technologies required for economic development, thereby reversing their previous attitudes. Multinational profits were increasingly viewed as payments for knowledge and technology rather than as interest paid on capital, and foreign ownership became accepted, in certain cases, as a necessary safeguard for foreign investors' intellectual property.
