= Alan M. Rugman =

Economist

Alan M. Rugman (1945 – 2014) was a leading scholar in the field of international business. In his last academic role, he served as Head of International Business and Strategy at Henley Business School, University of Reading in Reading, United Kingdom.

== Biography ==
The English-born Rugman earned his B.A. in economics from Leeds University in 1966, followed by an M.Sc. in economic development (1967) from London University (SOAS). He later became a Canadian citizen and earned his Ph.D. in economics in 1974 from Simon Fraser University in Vancouver, British Columbia, Canada. He died in July 2014.

Rugman has held academic posts at the University of Toronto, Dalhousie University, University of Winnipeg, University of Oxford, and Indiana University, and visiting professor positions at several other major universities including Columbia University Business School, Harvard University, M.I.T, and London Business School. He is a Fellow of the Academy of International Business (AIB) and was president of AIB from 2004 to 2006. He served as outside advisor to two Canadian prime ministers on issues of trade, FDI and international competitiveness, and in such capacity advised on the negotiation and adoption of the North American Free Trade Agreement.

== Regional nature of the MNE ==
While the conversation in academia and the public surrounding "globalization" grew in the late 1990s and early 2000s and works such as Thomas Friedman's The World is Flat gained notoriety, Rugman proposed that most of the world's largest firms are mainly regional

== Selected publications ==
Rugman authored or coauthored more than 400 publications including books, book chapters and journal articles.

Selected books

- Rugman, A.M. (1979) International Diversification and the Multinational Enterprise, Lexington Books.
- Rugman, A.M. (1981) Inside the Multinationals: The Economics of Internal Markets, Columbia University Press.
- Rugman, A.M. (2001) The End of Globalization, Random House.
- Rugman, A.M. and D'Cruz, J.R. (2003) Multinationals as Flagship Firms, Oxford University Press.
- Rugman, A.M. (2005) The Regional Multinationals. MNEs and "Global" Strategic Management, Cambridge University Press.

Selected journal articles

- Rugman, A.M. (1976) "Risk reduction by international diversification", Journal of International Business Studies, 7 (2), 75-80.
- Dunning, J.H. and Rugman, A.M. (1985) "The influence of Hymer's dissertation on the theory of foreign direct investment", American Economic Review, 75 (2, Papers and Proceedings of the Ninety-Seventh Annual Meeting of the American Economic Association), 228-232.
- Rugman, A.M. and Verbeke, A. (1992) "A note on the transnational solution and the transaction cost theory of multinational strategic management", Journal of International Business Studies, 23 (4), 761-771.
- Rugman, A.M. and Verbeke, A. (1998) "Corporate strategy and international environmental policy", Journal of International Business Studies, 29 (4), 819-833.
- Rugman, A.M. and Verbeke, A. (2001) "Subsidiary-specific advantages in multinational enterprises", Strategic Management Journal, 22 (3), 237-250.
- Rugman, A.M. and Verbeke, A. (2002) "Edith Penrose's contribution to the resource-based view of strategic management", Strategic Management Journal, 23 (8), 769-780.
- Rugman, A.M. and Verbeke, A. (2003) "Extending the theory of the multinational enterprise: internalization and strategic management perspective", Journal of International Business Studies, 34, 125-137.
- Rugman, A.M. and Verbeke, A. (2004) "A perspective on regional and global strategies of multinational enterprises", Journal of International Business Studies, 35 (1), 3-18.
