= Yunus Social Business =

Non-profit organisation

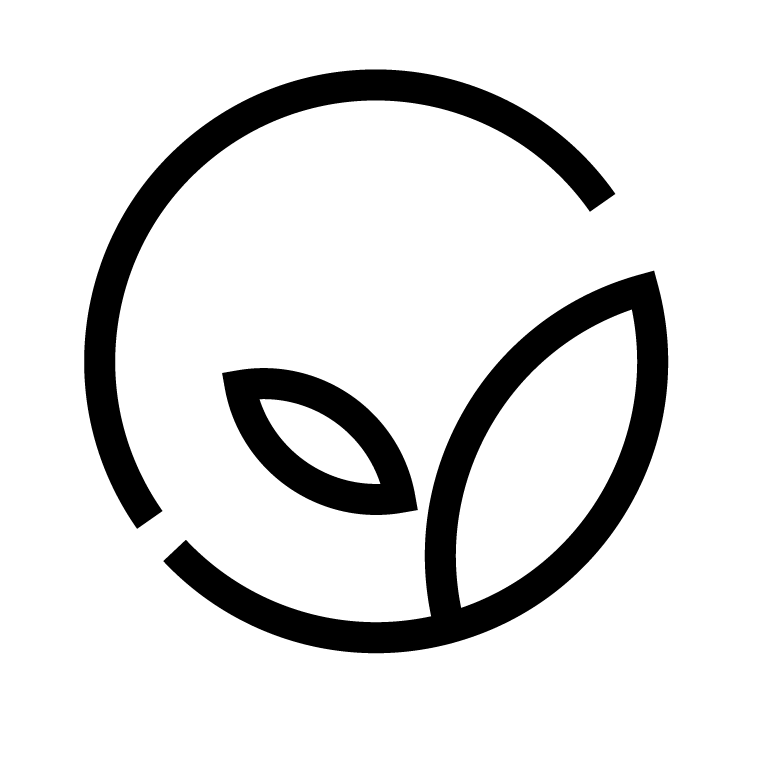
- Industry: Impact investing
- Founder: Muhammad Yunus, Saskia Bruysten, Sophie Eisenmann
- Headquarters: Berlin, Germany
- Area served: Brazil, Colombia, India, Kenya, Uganda
- Website: yunussb.com

Yunus Social Business (YSB) is a non-profit organisation with an impact-investing arm, Yunus Funds, and a corporate social-innovation consulting arm, Yunus Corporate Innovation. Both business units are based on furthering the concept of social business.

YSB was co-founded by Muhammad Yunus, Saskia Bruysten and Sophie Eisenmann in 2011. Its stated mission is to "harness the power of business to end poverty and the climate crisis."

== History ==
Prior to co-founding Yunus Social Business, Muhammad Yunus pioneered the field of micro-finance through Grameen Bank in his home country of Bangladesh. Muhammad Yunus and Grameen Bank received the Nobel Peace Prize for establishing microfinance and trying to tackle poverty. Grameen Bank became the first of several social businesses that Muhammad Yunus founded.

In 2008, Muhammad Yunus and future YSB co-founder Saskia Bruysten met at the London School of Economics, where Muhammad Yunus was giving a talk on the promise of social business. Later, they exchanged contact information. This encounter led the former management consultant, Bruysten, to visit some of Muhammad Yunus' social businesses in Bangladesh. Bruysten then started setting up Grameen Creative Lab with a German entrepreneur, where her former BCG colleague Sophie Eisenmann later joined. In 2011, the trio agreed to co-found Yunus Social Business beyond Bangladesh.

YSB is active in six countries, with local offices in Brazil, Colombia, India, Kenya and Uganda.

== Yunus Funds ==
Yunus Funds is the non-profit impact-investing arm of Yunus Social Business. It provides patient loans and post-investment support to social businesses in Brazil, Colombia, India, Kenya, Rwanda and Uganda. Yunus Funds covers the sectors Agriculture and Livelihoods, Health and Sanitation, Education and Training and Energy and Environment.

Social businesses financed by YSB include:

- Tugende, is a social business based in Uganda that offers motorcycle-taxi drivers (boda boda drivers) the opportunity to rent their bike and ultimately own a motorcycle. As of 2022, Tugende has served 52,000 customers. Yunus Social Business provided financing to Tugende in 2017. In 2021, Tugende went on to raise US$9.9 million in Series A funding.
- Impact Water, a social business based in Uganda that provides affordable water-purification systems to schools. As of 2022, Impact Water has installed water-purification systems at 32,517 schools, reaching 14.3 million students. Impact Water entered YSB's portfolio in 2015. Impact Water paid off its loan and left the YSB portfolio in 2022.

== Yunus Corporate Innovation ==
Yunus Corporate Innovation is the corporate social-innovation consulting arm of Yunus Social Business.

Some of the projects that Yunus Corporate Innovation has worked on include: the Fight for Access Accelerator Accelerator with Reckitt; the FLANE Accelerator for Female Entrepreneurship with Vodafone Institute; MAN Truck & Bus Impact Accelerator; the zero-waste social-business joint-venture Vishuddh with Cofresco of Melitta Group; the social-procurement initiative Micro Hub with IKEA Social Entrepreneurship; the social-procurement social-business joint-venture Campo Vivo with McCain.

Yunus Corporate Innovation has conducted qualitative and quantitative research into the business benefits of social intrapreneurship in collaboration with the World Economic Forum's Schwab Foundation for Social Entrepreneurship, Porticus, INSEAD and HEC Paris. These include "Business as Unusual: How Social Intrapreneurs Can Turn Companies Into A Force For Good", "Business as Unusual: The Playbook for Designing Social Intrapreneurship Programmes" and "Business as Unusual: Making the Case for Social Intrapreneurship".

Yunus Corporate Innovation has conducted research into the business benefits of social procurement in collaboration with SAP and BCG. These include "The Social Procurement Manual" and "A $500 Billion Market Opportunity for Real Impact at Scale".

== Partnerships ==
=== COVID Alliance for Social Entrepreneurship ===
In 2020, YSB, together with the World Economic Forum co-initiated the COVID Alliance for Social Entrepreneurship. The initiative brought 100 social-impact organisations together to try to support social businesses. The Alliance states that:

Members of the Alliance commit to and call on their peers to stand by social entrepreneurs in their capacity as front-line responders to the health crisis and as pioneers of a green, inclusive society and economic system.

=== Unusual Pioneers ===
Unusual Pioneers is a social-intrapreneurship accelerator for corporations. It was co-initiated in 2021 by Yunus Social Business, the World Economic Forum's Schwab Foundation and Porticus. Participants in the 2021 cohort included social intrapreneurs representing Suez, Novartis, Unilever, Tata Trust, Accenture, ClubMed, Axa, Mastercard, and others.

=== Take a Stake Consortium ===
The Take a Stake Consortium is a funding initiative by the Yunus Social Business and Waste Foundation, launched in 2021. The consortium has been joined by the Swedish International Development Cooperation Agency and IKEA Social Entrepreneurship. Take a Stake aims to close a funding gap in the WASH and waste sectors, initially in East Africa and India.

=== Social Success Note ===
The Social Success Note was created by Yunus Funds, the Rockefeller Foundation and the UBS Optimus Foundation, aiming to finance underfunded sectors and populations. The Social Success Note is an outcome-based financing mechanism in which a commercial bank is incentivized to lend to social businesses by a donor, who provides a grant to the commercial bank representing market returns (in addition to the social business' loan repayments) when the social business meets predefined objectives.

=== Core partnerships ===
BCG has been a core partner of Yunus Social Business since 2013. BCG has provided YSB with pro-bono consulting projects, created a secondee programme where BCG consultants can work for YSB and provided pro-bono consulting projects directly to YSB portfolio social businesses. YSB is one of BCG's five global impact partnerships.

Freshfields has been a core partner of YSB since YSB was first legally incorporated in 2011. Since then, Freshfields has provided pro-bono legal services to YSB on an ongoing basis.

== See also ==
- Yunus Centre
- Social entrepreneur
- Social enterprise
- Impact Investing
- Venture philanthropy
- Social business
- Grameen Danone
- Corporate social entrepreneurship
- Sustainable procurement
- Sustainable Development Goals
