= 2008 Bangladeshi general election =

- 29 December 2008

300 of the 345 seats in the Jatiya Sangsad (Note: Voting was postponed in one constituency due to the death of a candidate) 151 seats needed for a majority
- Registered: 81,087,003
- Turnout: 87.13% (▲12.16pp)
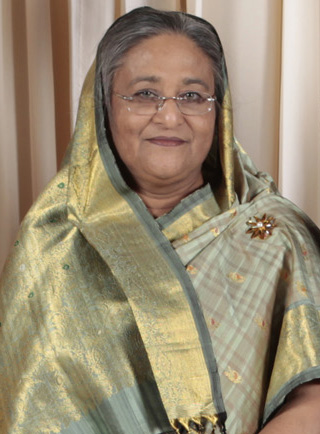

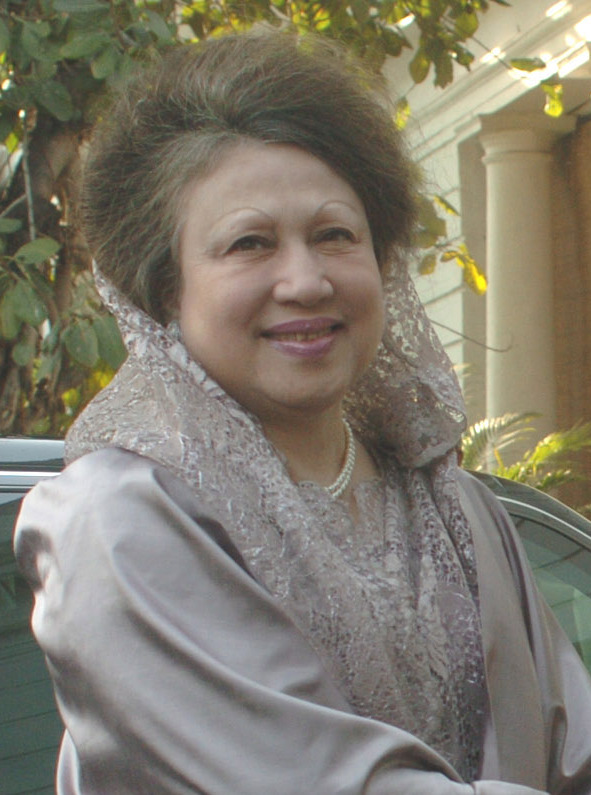

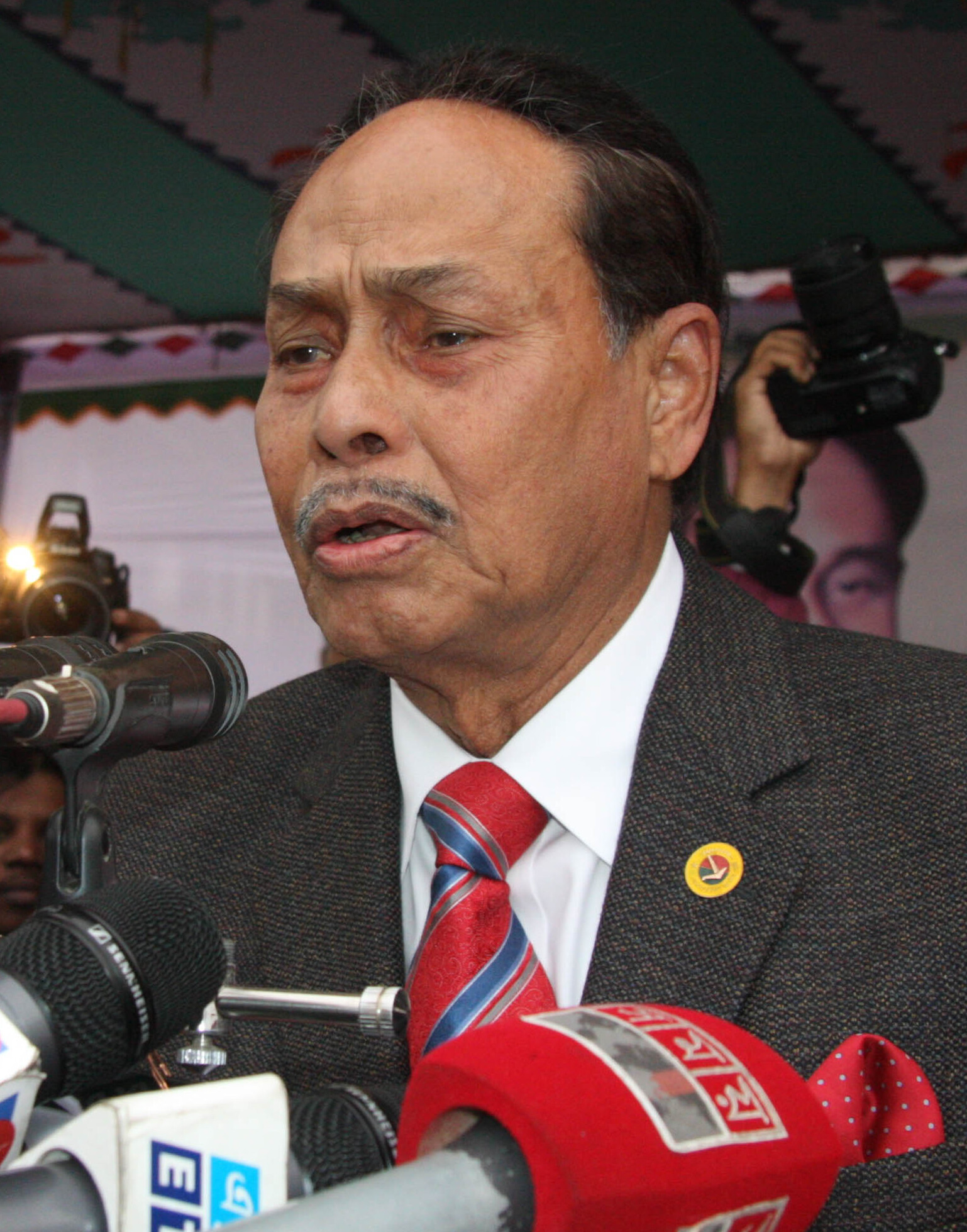
	First party	Second party	Third party
Leader	Sheikh Hasina	Khaleda Zia	H.M. Ershad
Party	AL	BNP	JP(E)
Alliance	Grand Alliance	Four Party Alliance	Grand Alliance
Last election	40.02%, 62 seats	41.40%, 193 seats	7.22%, 14 seats
Seats won	230	30	27
Seat change	▲168	▼163	▲13
Popular vote	33,634,629	22,757,101	4,926,360
Percentage	48.04%	32.50%	7.04%
Swing	▲8.02pp	▼8.90pp	▼0.18pp
Chief Adviser before election
Fakhruddin Ahmed
Independent (caretaker)
Prime Minister after election
Sheikh Hasina
AL

General elections were held in Bangladesh on 29 December 2008. The two main parties in the election were the Bangladesh Nationalist Party (BNP), led by Khaleda Zia, and the Bangladesh Awami League, led by Sheikh Hasina. The Bangladesh Awami League Party formed a fourteen-party Grand Alliance including Ershad's Jatiya Party, while the BNP formed a four-party alliance which included Jamaat-e-Islami. The election was originally scheduled for January 2007, but it was postponed by a military-controlled caretaker government for an extended period of time.

The elections resulted in a landslide victory for the Awami League-led grand alliance, which won 263 seats of the 300 directly elected seats. The main rival four-party alliance received only 32 seats, with the remaining four going to independent candidates. Polling in the constituency of Noakhali-1 was postponed due to the mysterious death of the AL candidate. The election for the seat was held on 12 January 2009 instead and was won by the BNP candidate. Voter turnout was 87%, the highest ever recorded in a Bangladeshi general election.

== Main political parties ==
On 11 December, the Awami League formed a coalition with the Jatiya Party led by Hussain Muhammad Ershad once deposed through mass uprising. The coalition included some other minor parties. The Bangladesh Nationalist Party, BNP in short, continued with its alliance with Jamaat-e-Islami formed for the national election of 2001 to participate in the 2008 election.

=== Awami League-led coalition (Grand Alliance) ===
The Bangladesh Awami League (AL) decided to participate in the 2008 parliamentary election under the name of "Grand Alliance" with the Jatiya Party led by General Ershad as its main partner. The AL contested the polls for 245 constituencies. Awami League conceded as many as 46 out of 300 parliamentary constituencies to Jatiya Party (JP).

Workers Party president Rashed Khan Menon contested for Dhaka-8, its general secretary Bimal Biswas for Narail-1, its politburo member Fazle Hossain Badsha for Rajshahi-2, Jatiya Samajtantrik Dal president Hasanul Haq Inu for Kushtia-2, its leaders Moinuddin Khan Badal for Chittagong-8, Rezaul Karim Tansen for Bogra-4, Shah Ahmed Jikrul for Brahmanbaria-5 and Gias Uddin for Mymensingh-9.

The Awami League kept the Noakhali-1 constituency reserved, where the election has been postponed following the death of Ganatantri Party leader Mohammad Nurul Islam in a mysterious fire. The alliance has kept three more seats (Nilphamari-4, Khulna-3 and Sylhet-3) open for both AL and JP candidates to contest for.

=== BNP-led coalition (4-Party Alliance) ===
The Bangladesh Nationalist Party (BNP) and its allies contested for 296 out of 300 in the 2008 election. The Election Commission cancelled candidacy of nominees of BNP in four constituencies. The BNP and its allies could not reach a consensus on sharing six constituencies. Bangladesh Jamaat-e-Islami contested in the election in 38 constituencies although BNP agreed to offer Jamaat 34 seats. BNP conceded two seats each to its three smaller allies which were Bangladesh Jatiya Party, Islami Oikya Jote and Jamiat-e-Ulama-e-Islam. BNP was able to place any candidate for four constituencies which were Barisal-1, Moulvibazar-2, Sirajganj-5 and Narail-2. However, two BNP rebels emerged as valid independent candidates in Barisal-1 and Moulvibazar-2. They were Jahiruddin Swapan in Barisal-1 and former lawmaker MM Shaheen in Moulvibazar-2.

== Formation of the caretaker government ==
The BNP-Jamat led coalition government attempted to run an election in 2006. Awami League and other parties arranged various processions and strikes, protesting that the election result was pre-arranged in the government's favour. In course of time the clash between the Government and Opposition became very violent and in the Care-taker Government's period violence engulfed the nation. The president proclaimed his authority as the chief of the Care-Taker Government and eventually had to fall to the demand of the people. With the intervention of the Army the president had to resign from his Chief-Advisor's post and Fakhruddin Ahmed was appointed as the new chief adviser. The media referred to Ahmed's government as "military-backed". The military-controlled government worked on a minus-two formula which meant ousting Hasina and Zia, who were two popular political leaders of the country. While all political activities were suspended under the state of emergency, the government aimed to recast the political system of the country with people of high national and international stature. In accordance with this plan, Nobel Peace Prize-winner Muhammad Yunus announced the foundation of a new party called Citizens' Power. However, soon Yunus rejected entering politics, claiming a lack of support.

== Struggle for new elections ==
On 5 April 2007, the country's Chief Election Commissioner, ATM Shamsul Huda, declared that the elections would need to be pushed back at least eighteen months. On 12 April, Ahmed announced in a televised speech to the nation that the next parliamentary election would be held before the end of 2008. On 15 July 2007, the Bangladesh Election Commission published a road map for the election, promising a compilation of voter lists by October 2008 and an official election call before the end of that year. The constitution of Bangladesh, however, provides holding election within 120 days of the formation of a caretaker government.

After the election, the Jatiyo Sangshad had to elect the next president of Bangladesh. The presidential election should have taken place by 5 September 2007 when Iajuddin Ahmed's term expired. But the election was postponed as the Constitution of Bangladesh permits to delay the presidential election until a new Jatiyo Sangshad is formed. On 9 September 2007, President Ahmed addressed the nation and recalled indoor politics with strict conditions to facilitate preparation for the election and reaffirmed his commitment to hold the election on time or earlier. In early October, the Chief Election Commissioner Huda stated elections could be held by October 2008 if the electoral roll could be compiled by July 2008.

Talks between the government and two smaller parties started on 22 May 2008, with the government indicating it would hold talks with all parties in short time. However, both the Awami League and the BNP declined to attend these talks as long as their leaders were still detained. Voters lists were announced to be ready on 22 July 2008.

On 4 August 2008, mayor and city council elections were held in Sylhet, Khulna, Barisal and Rajshahi cities. BBC News reported that the candidates supported by the Awami League won twelve of the thirteen city corporations and municipalities voting, according to election commission officials. Finally, Chief Adviser Dr. Fakhruddin Ahmed announced on 21 September that the general election would be held on 18 December.

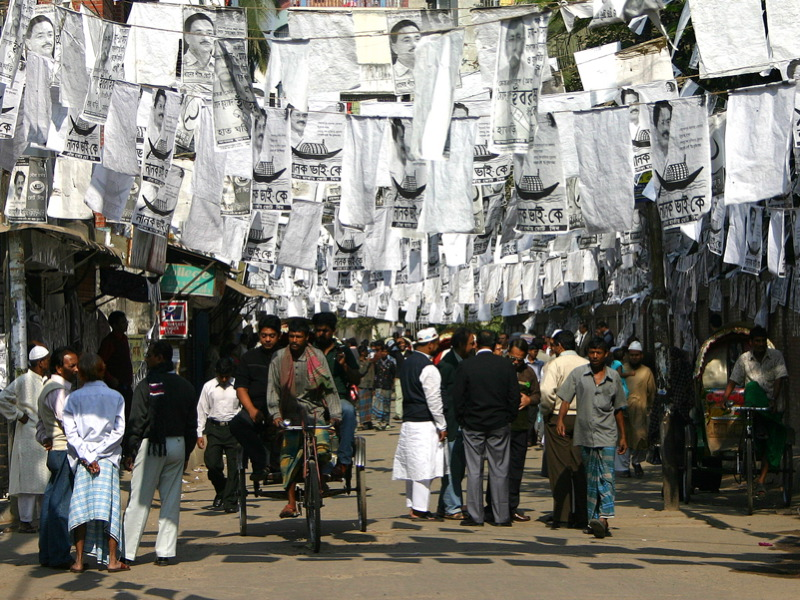
Election banners of candidates promoted across many cities in Bangladesh, 2008

The BNP called for a delay of the election until January 2009, while the Awami League was against such a delay. As a compromise, the election was postponed from 18 to 29 December. In a response to the demand of the major political parties, on 17 December 2008, the two-year-long state of emergency was lifted.

== Supreme Court ruling ==
Party	Number of candidates
Islamic Front Bangladesh	2
Islamic Movement Bangladesh	160
Islami Oikya Jote	4
United Citizens Movement	11
Krishak Shramik Janata League	46
Democratic Party	5
People's Front	14
Gano Forum	45
Jamaat-e-Ulama Islam Bangladesh	7
Zaker Party	37
National Democratic Party	2
Jatiya Party	46
Jatiya Party-JP	7
Jatiya Samajtantrik Dal-Jasad	6
Jatiya Samajtantrik Dal (Rab)	44
National People's Party	29
Progressive Democratic Party	21
Freedom Party	2
Bangladesh Awami League	259
Bangladesh Islamic Front	18
Bangladesh Kalayan Party	39
Bangladesh Khilafat Andolan	32
Bangladesh Khelafat Majlis	8
Bangladesh Jatiya Party	10
Bangladesh Jatiya Party-BJP	2
Bangladesh Nationalist Party	256
Bangladesh Jamaat-e-Islami	39
Bangladesh Tarikat Federation	31
Bangladesh National Awami Party	14
Bangladesh National Awami Party-Bangladesh NAP	5
Bangladesh Muslim League	5
Bangladesher Samajtantrik Dal	57
Workers Party of Bangladesh	5
Communist Party of Bangladesh	38
Revolutionary Workers Party of Bangladesh	5
Bangladesher Samayabadi Dal (ML)	1
Bikalpa Dhara Bangladesh	62
Liberal Democratic Party	18
Independent	141
Total:	1538

== Results ==
The voter turnout of 80 percent was the highest in the history of Bangladeshi elections. This was the first time elections used national ID cards with photographs to avoid fake voting, which was an UN-funded initiative to create a digital electoral roll. Prior to the elections, 11 million false names were removed from the voter lists.

About 50,000 soldiers of Bangladeshi Army and 600,000 police officers were deployed to guard against election fraud and violence. However, two people were killed in post election violence.

Seats won by alliance (left) and party (right)
Party or alliance		Votes	%	Seats			
Party or alliance		Votes	%	General	Women	Total	+/–
Grand Alliance	Awami League	33,634,629	48.04	230	36	266	+204
Grand Alliance	Jatiya Party (Ershad)	4,926,360	7.04	27	4	31	+17
Grand Alliance	Jatiya Samajtantrik Dal	506,605	0.72	3	0	3	+3
Grand Alliance	Workers Party of Bangladesh	262,093	0.37	2	0	2	+2
Grand Alliance	Liberal Democratic Party	191,679	0.27	1	0	1	New
Grand Alliance	Total	39,521,366	56.45	263	40	303	+227
Four Party; Alliance	Bangladesh Nationalist Party	22,757,101	32.50	30	5	35	–158
Four Party; Alliance	Bangladesh Jamaat-e-Islami	3,289,967	4.70	2	0	2	–15
Four Party; Alliance	Bangladesh Jatiya Party	173,292	0.25	1	0	1	–3
Four Party; Alliance	Islami Oikya Jote	108,415	0.15	0	0	0	–2
Four Party; Alliance	Total	26,328,775	37.61	33	5	38	–178
Islami Andolan Bangladesh		658,254	0.94	0	0	0	0
Jamiat Ulema-e-Islam Bangladesh		175,245	0.25	0	0	0	0
Bikalpa Dhara Bangladesh		146,827	0.21	0	0	0	New
Zaker Party		134,933	0.19	0	0	0	0
Jatiya Ganotantrik Party		107,796	0.15	0	0	0	New
Krishak Sramik Janata League		102,879	0.15	0	0	0	–1
Gano Forum		72,911	0.10	0	0	0	0
Communist Party of Bangladesh		42,331	0.06	0	0	0	0
Socialist Party of Bangladesh		38,643	0.06	0	0	0	0
Jatiya Samajtantrik Dal (Rab)		37,350	0.05	0	0	0	New
Bangladesh Islami Front		31,785	0.05	0	0	0	0
Khelafat Majlish		27,921	0.04	0	0	0	New
Bangladesh National Awami Party		24,141	0.03	0	0	0	New
Bangladesh Kalayan Party		21,609	0.03	0	0	0	New
Bangladesh Tarikat Federation		19,905	0.03	0	0	0	New
Bangladesh Khilafat Andolan		16,944	0.02	0	0	0	0
Progressive Democratic Party		14,228	0.02	0	0	0	New
National People's Party		10,348	0.01	0	0	0	New
Bangladesh Jatiya Party		8,383	0.01	0	0	0	New
Jatiya Party (Manju)		7,818	0.01	0	0	0	–1
Bangladesh NAP		4,365	0.01	0	0	0	New
People's Front		4,009	0.01	0	0	0	New
United Citizens Movement		3,542	0.01	0	0	0	New
Ganatantri Party		2,550	0.00	0	0	0	0
Revolutionary Workers Party of Bangladesh		2,021	0.00	0	0	0	New
Bangladesh Muslim League		1,113	0.00	0	0	0	0
Islamic Front Bangladesh		1,020	0.00	0	0	0	New
Bangladesh Freedom Party		566	0.00	0	0	0	New
Communist Party of Bangladesh (ML)		297	0.00	0	0	0	0
Independents		2,060,392	2.94	4	0	4	–2
None of the above		381,924	0.55	–	–	–	–
Total		70,012,191	100.00	300	45	345	+45
Valid votes		70,012,191	99.10				
Invalid/blank votes		636,294	0.90				
Total votes		70,648,485	100.00				
Registered voters/turnout		81,087,003	87.13				
Source: ECB, Asian Tribune

=== By division ===
Division	Awami League	BNP	Jatiya Party	JSD	Jamaat	BWP	BJP	LDP	Independent	Total seats
Barisal	16	2	2	0	0	0	1	0	0	21
Chittagong	32	18	2	2	2	0	0	1	1	58
Dhaka	63	0	5	0	0	1	0	0	1	70
Khulna	30	2	2	1	0	0	0	0	1	36
Mymensingh	24	0	0	0	0	0	0	0	0	24
Rajshahi	27	8	2	0	0	1	0	0	1	39
Rangpur	21	0	12	0	0	0	0	0	0	33
Sylhet	17	0	2	0	0	0	0	0	0	19
Total	230	30	27	3	2	2	1	1	4	300
Source: ECB

== Reactions ==
- Prime Minister of India Manmohan Singh congratulated Sheikh Hasina on the landslide victory. Singh conveyed the message "I look forward to working with you towards this end for the mutual benefit of our two people". India's External Affairs Minister Pranab Mukherjee said, "I do hope that once the new government comes, we will discuss the existence of the problem (terrorism emanating from Bangladesh) with them and we will see what best can be done". Other political parties of India, such as Bhartiya Janata Party, Trinamool Congress and CPI(M) also congratulated Sheikh Hasina.
- President of United States George W. Bush phoned Sheikh Hasina and congratulated her on assuming the office of Prime Minister of Bangladesh. President Bush, who made the phone call at 6:40 pm Bangladesh time on 11 January, termed Hasina's success in the parliamentary election a "landslide victory", an official handout said. He said the verdict of the people of Bangladesh to establish non-communal democracy is notable. Prime Minister Hasina thanked the US president on behalf of the government and people of Bangladesh and her party. She said the support and cooperation of the US, along with other countries, toward holding a free, fair and neutral election in Bangladesh was commendable. The principal enemy of Bangladeshi people was poverty, she said and hoped for US cooperation to build a poverty-free Bangladesh. The prime minister told the US president that terrorism was one of the main problems in South Asia. She stressed the need for taking an effective joint initiative to fight terrorism in the region.
- (United Kingdom) The British prime minister Gordon Brown congratulated Sheikh Hasina on the election victory and her swearing-in as Prime Minister of the People's Republic of Bangladesh, said a release of the British High Commission in Dhaka. Brown said, 'My congratulations on your victory. The UK values its close ties with Bangladesh and we look forward to working with your government to help you meet the expectations of your people. I hope that you will work with all parties to create a brighter future for Bangladesh. Foreign Secretary David Miliband, in the statement, urged the ruling party and the opposition to work together for nation building, shunning politics of confrontation and violence. "The Election Commission, caretaker government and observers have worked hard to create conditions in which free, fair and peaceful elections can take place. "The people of Bangladesh have spoken in huge numbers and they can be proud of the manner in which the elections were conducted", Miliband said in a statement released by the local British high commission. "This is a historic moment for Bangladesh to cast aside the politics of confrontation and violence, in favour of inclusive and consensual democracy", he added. Terming Britain as Bangladesh's friend, he said, "We urge the next government and opposition to work together to meet the expectations of the people in the days and years to come." Cherie Blair, the wife of former British prime minister Tony Blair, also greeted Sheikh Hasina for becoming Prime Minister of Bangladesh.
- German chancellor Angela Merkel has congratulated newly elected Prime Minister Sheikh Hasina. In a message of felicitation, the chancellor said she looks forward to further developing the relationship of trust and cooperation between Bangladesh and Germany, reports UNB. Merkel said Germany will continue to be a reliable partner of Bangladesh as it works to strengthen democracy, the rule of law and human rights.
- Chinese premier Wen Jiabao has congratulated Sheikh Hasina on her assumption of office of the prime minister, expressing the hope that a comprehensive partnership between Dhaka and Beijing would be raised to a new level, reports UNB. In a message of felicitation, Jiabao said Bangladesh and China are intimate and friendly close neighbours. He said since establishment of diplomatic relations 34 years ago, the two countries always maintain mutual understanding, trust and support to each other, and developed fruitful cooperation in every field. This cooperation, he said, has brought substantial benefits to the people of both the countries and made positive contributions to regional peace and development. The Chinese premier said through the joint efforts with Prime Minister Hasina bilateral relations as well as friendship and mutual cooperation would be strengthened further. In a separate message of felicitation to Foreign Minister Dr Dipumoni, Chinese Foreign Minister Yang Jiechi said it is the unswerving policy of the Chinese government to consistently strengthen and solidify friendly cooperation between China and Bangladesh.
- The Japanese foreign minister, Hirofumi Nakasone in a statement offered felicitations on the Awami League president, Sheikh Hasina's inauguration as the country's next prime minister, said a release of the Japan embassy. He said, "The Government of Japan congratulates on the inauguration of Her Excellency Sheikh Hasina, President of the Awami League as Prime Minister of Bangladesh on January 6, 2009, following the general election on December 29, 2008". Nakasone said that this election was successfully carried out despite various challenges. "This exemplifies that a consolidation of democracy in Bangladesh is making a steady progress, marking a right start of a new democracy in Bangladesh", he said. The Japanese foreign minister said, "The Government of Japan hopes that the people of Bangladesh will be united in making efforts for further development of their country under the new Prime Minister elected in a democratic process. Japan will continue to support their endeavour".
- (Switzerland) President of the Swiss Confederation Hans-Rudolf Merz greeted new Bangla-deshi Prime Minister Sheikh Hasina .In a message to Hasina, the Swiss president, on behalf of the Swiss Federal Council, expressed his sincere congratulation and wished her every success in the eminent post. The message noted that "the recent elections are an important milestone in the history of Bangladesh. On this special occasion, the Swiss government reiterates its commitment to continue its support to the democratic, social and economic development in Bangladesh."
- Australia welcomed Bangladesh's return to democracy after around two years following what it observed were 'peaceful and orderly' polls. "Australia encourages all parties to work together to ensure a smooth transition and a strong future for the people of Bangladesh", the Australian high commission said in a press statement yesterday. "The Australian government looks forward to working closely with the newly-elected government in areas of mutual interest." "These include trade and investment, development assistance, counter-terrorism, education, migration and tourism", said the statement.
- President of Pakistan Asif Ali Zardari and Prime Minister of Pakistan Yousuf Raza Gilani on Thursday sent congratulations to Sheikh Hasina Wajid on her victory. President Zardari expressed confidence that the close brotherly relations between the two countries would be strengthened further under her leadership. The prime minister said: "We wish you every success and the brotherly people of Bangladesh ever greater progress and prosperity."
- Nepalese prime minister Pushpa Kamal Dahal "Prachanda" in a message of congratulation to Prime Minister Sheikh Hasina noted that the recent elections in Bangladesh had ushered in a democratic governance and overwhelming people's support Hasina's party reflects their expectations to feel the real change. In this context, he said both Nepal and Bangladesh have similar experiences as the Nepali people have also displayed their keenness to build a new prosperous Nepal through the election of Constituent Assembly held last April. He said Nepal and Bangladesh can work together for achieving goals to consolidate bilateral relations and hoped that relations between the two countries would be further strengthened during the term of Sheikh Hasina.
- Prime Minister of Mauritius Navinchandra Ramgoolam greeted Bangladesh's Premier Sheikh Hasina on the decisive victory by the Awami League-led grand alliance in the polls."I'm confident that under your leadership, the people of Bangladesh will realise their long cherished aspirants to make progress in a secular and democratic state-- a dream personified by your illustrious father Sheikh Mujibur Rahman," the Mauritius PM said in a letter of felicitation to Hasina.
- Secretary-General of the United Nations Ban Ki-moon, in a message on Thursday, extended his greeting to Sheikh Hasina for taking over as Bangladesh prime minister. The UN chief also hailed the people of Bangladesh for holding the national election in a peaceful manner for democratic transition. He appreciated the initiatives of Hasina for working together with all political parties to consolidate parliamentary democracy in Bangladesh, according to a press release. Ban Ki-moon appreciated Bangladesh as some 9,000 Bangladeshi army and police personnel have taken part in various activities of the United Nations, particularly in the peacekeeping missions. The UN chief wished success of the Bangladesh's new prime minister and assured her of all-out cooperation.
- (United States) U.S. State Department congratulated the Bangladesh Election Commission and government officials on the successful election. A statement issued stated high voter turnout underscores the people's desire to see democracy restored.
- Alexander Graf Lambsdorff, European Union's chief election observer said "voting has largely been peaceful, turnout has been high and procedures were followed adequately".

== Transfer of power ==
Following the announcement of the election results, Sheikh Hasina was sworn in as Prime Minister on 6 January 2009, formally ending the military-controlled caretaker government led by Chief Adviser Dr. Fakhruddin Ahmed.
