= Holly Mosher =

American filmmaker

- Education: Tisch School of the Arts
- Occupation: Filmmaker
- Notable work: Vanishing of the Bees, Side Effects

Holly Mosher is an American filmmaker who produces and directs documentaries focused on social change. She directed the documentary Hummingbird. Mosher produced Vanishing of the Bees and Side Effects. She started an independent film distribution company, Hummingbird Pictures, which focuses on socially-conscious films.

== Career ==
Mosher graduated from New York University's Tisch School of the Arts. She worked as an assistant on films in Brazil and produced commercials.

Mosher made her directorial debut with the 2004 documentary, Hummingbird, a film about two organizations which work with Brazilian street children and women who are victims of domestic violence. She produced Side Effects in 2005 and Money Talks: Profits Before Patient Safety in 2006. Mosher also co-produced Maybe Baby in 2007. She was executive producer of Vanishing of the Bees, FREE FOR ALL! and Pay 2 Play: Democracy's High Stakes, a documentary about the influence of money in politics. In 2011, she directed Bonsai People: The Vision of Muhammad Yunus, a feature-length documentary about the work of Muhammad Yunus and the lending system he founded for people in poverty. In 2025 she executive produced The Invisible Mammal . Mosher also dabbles in real estate and is a partner in an eco, health wellness community called Belle Farm in Wisconsin.

She has also served on the boards for the Social Enterprise Alliance LA Chapter, Public Interest Pictures and serves as the Director of Outreach and Communications for Money Out Voters In.

== Filmography ==
Year	Title	Credit
1999	Haunting Perpetually Dead Squirrels	Producer, Cinematographer
2001	Lady in the Box	Co-Producer
2003	Reeseville	Producer
2003	An Obvious Moment of Happiness	Associate Producer, Cinematographer
2004	Hummingbird (Documentary)	Producer, Cinematographer, Director
2005	Side Effects	Producer
2005	Next Big Thing: The 2 Skinnee J's Farewell Show	Cinematographer
2006	Money Talks: Profits Before Patient Safety (Documentary)	Producer
2007	Maybe Baby (Documentary)	Co-producer
2008	Free for All! (Documentary)	Executive producer
2009	Vanishing of the Bees (Documentary)	Executive producer
2011	Bonsai People: The Vision of Muhammad Yunus (Documentary)	Producer, Cinematographer, Director
2014	Pay 2 Play: Democracy's High Stakes (Documentary)	Executive producer
2025	The Invisible Mammal (Documentary)	Executive producer
