= Kathleen Slattery-Moschkau =

American podcast host

Kathleen Slattery-Moschkau (pronounced like "Moscow") is an American sustainable real estate developer, meditation teacher, and podcast host. The podcast (originally called The Kathleen Show) launched in 2006 featured renowned guests such as Maya Angelou, Michael Pollan and Sir Ken Robinson. After a hiatus from recording, she relaunched the popular show as The Kathleen Sessions. She is also known for directing the 2005 satirical film Side Effects.

== Early life and education ==
Slattery-Moschkau grew up in Ladysmith, Wisconsin. She received a political science degree from the University of Wisconsin-Madison in 1991.

== Sustainable Real Estate ==
Slattery-Moschkau is the developer of Belle Farm, a 44 acre ego/agri/wellness neighborhood near Madison, WI.

== Meditation ==
Kathleen has been practicing meditation and yoga for over twenty years and teaching for almost a decade.

== Side Effects ==
In 2005, the satirical film Side Effects, which Slattery-Moschkau wrote, directed, and co-produced, was released. She has said that the story depicted in the movie, which follows fictional drug rep Karly Hert (Katherine Heigl), is "actually my story" and that she, like Hert, was stunned that experience working as a rep for the cell phone industry and a political science degree were all she needed to become a pharmaceutical sales rep. She has also said that the movie was shot in only 16 ”sleepless, crazy, insane days", and that she regrets having filmed it at so many different locations.

== Personal life ==
Slattery-Moschkau lives in Madison, Wisconsin, with her husband and two children.
