= Nagorik Shakti =

Bangladeshi proposed political party

Nagorik Shakti নাগরিক শক্তি
- Founder: Muhammad Yunus
- Founded: 17 February 2007
- Dissolved: 3 May 2007
- Ideology: Secularism; Social liberalism
- Political position: Centre to centre-left
- Slogan: Bangladesh Go Ahead, Bangladesh

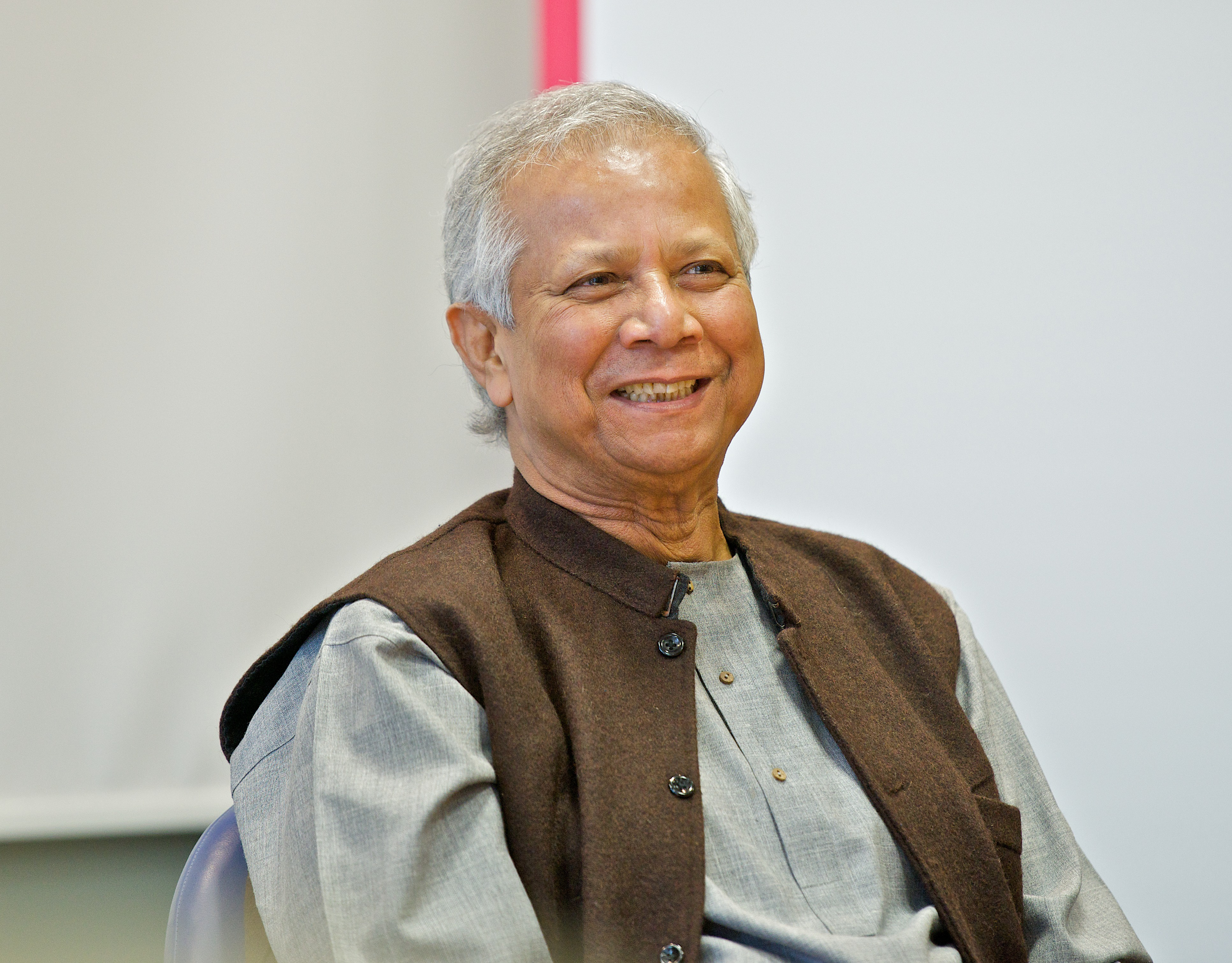
Nobel Laureate, Muhammad Yunus, the proponent of Nagorik Shakti

Nagorik Shakti (Bengali: নাগরিক শক্তি) or Citizens' Power was a proposed political party in Bangladesh. It was conceived by 2006 Nobel Peace Prize winner Muhammad Yunus. Yunus communicated his ideas to the people of the nation and asked for feedback by writing a total of three letters addressed to the citizens in the prominent national daily The Daily Star. Yunus discontinued his venture in 2007 citing lack of interested eligible candidates.

== Political situation of Bangladesh ==
Bangladeshi politics was marred by instability, especially during the turmoil of 2006–08. Most top politicians, including former Prime Ministers Khaleda Zia and Sheikh Hasina were imprisoned on corruption charges, and a state of emergency existed. Hence, to counter the rampant corruption in politics, Yunus proposed a political party run by clean honest people.

== History ==
In early 2006 Yunus, along with other members of the civil society including Prof. Rehman Sobhan, former Chief Justice Adv. Muhammad Habibur Rahman, Barrister Dr. Kamal Hossain, Prothom Alo Editor Matiur Rahman, The Daily Star Editor Mahfuz Anam and Dr. Debapriya Bhattacharya, participated in a campaign for honest and clean candidates in national elections. He considered entering politics in the later part of that year.

== First letter ==
On 11 February 2007, Yunus wrote an open letter, published in the Bangladeshi newspaper Daily Star, where he asked citizens for views on his plan to float a political party to establish political goodwill, proper leadership and good governance. In the letter, he called on everyone to briefly outline how he should go about the task and how they can contribute to it.

== Unveiling ==
Yunus finally announced the foundation of a new party tentatively called Citizens' Power (Nagorik Shakti) on 18 February 2007. There was speculation that the army supported a move by Yunus into politics.

== Second letter ==
The second letter written by Yunus addressed to the citizens expressed his interests to join politics, outlining the foundations and principles of the party, a detailed organizational structure for the grassroots of the party, and featured addresses to women, the young, and the expatriates.

=== Motto and principles ===
Bangladesh egiye cholo or "March Ahead, Bangladesh" was to be the theme title of the movement, as declared in the second letter to the people. Among its aims is the reinstatement of a secular constitution as well as gains in female empowerment and the fight against poverty and corruption. It will attempt to appoint capable leaders with a commitment to honest governance and accountability. Dr. Yunus intended to make Bangladesh an economical check-point in South Asia by opening up its ports and establishing global ties.

=== Organization ===
Yunus outlined the organizational structure of the party through his second letter to the people.

The organisation of Nagorik Shakti was to be mostly based on the rural areas of Bangladesh: the villages. It was assumed that there will be 20 working people, and hoped that the parties will avoid going down the path of the more unruly elements in Bangladeshi politics by avoiding formal showdown such as public meetings, preferring instead to convince the electorate by proclaiming facts. Each unit should have 50% female worker-supporter and must have at least 33%. Ideally, females and young people should be among the party's key players. Each team or group must be able to nominate others to higher positions and this practice should be carried on right up to constituency level. Party expenses will be covered by its members.

Yunus intended his party to run for all 300 constituencies during the 2008 parliamentary elections.

== Conflict of interest with Grameen Bank ==
Yunus wants to avoid accusations of conflict of interest between his role in Shakti and with the Grameen Bank—the pioneering microcredit lender he founded in 1976. He has stated that he will reduce his involvement with the Bank, and that no Grameen Bank executives will be involved with the party.

== Reactions in the political arena ==
Right from its inception, the party has caused quite a stir in political circles. Though many political leaders initially remained tight-lipped, some expressed their bitterness regarding the party.

Then Former Prime Minister Sheikh Hasina expressed her displeasure over Yunus joining politics, saying, "Newcomers in politics are dangerous elements and are to be viewed with suspicion, they often do more harm to the nation than good."

Fazlul Haque Amini Chairman of Islami Oikya Jote said "Dr. Yunus is an enemy of the country, nation and Islam."

== Third letter ==
On 3 May Dr. Muhammad Yunus declared that he had decided to abandon his political plans following a meeting with the head of the interim government, Dr. Fakhruddin Ahmed.
