= Side Effects (2005 film) =

2005 film by Kathleen Slattery-Moschkau

- Film poster
- Directed by: Kathleen Slattery-Moschkau
- Written by: Kathleen Slattery-Moschkau
- Produced by: Katherine Heigl
- Starring: Katherine Heigl
- Distributed by: Warner Brothers
- Release dates: March 7, 2005 (Cinequest Film Festival); September 9, 2005 (United States)
- Running time: 90 minutes
- Country: United States
- Language: English

Side Effects is a 2005 romantic comedy about the pharmaceutical industry, directed by Kathleen Slattery-Moschkau and starring Katherine Heigl as Karly Hert, a pharmaceutical "detailer", who becomes disillusioned with the lack of ethics in the pharmaceutical industry and has tough choices to make. The film also stars Lucian McAfee, Dorian DeMichele as Karly’s unscrupulous boss, Dave Durbin, Temeceka Harris. The film's title is a reference to the medical term side effects and is based on a true story.

== Cast ==
- Katherine Heigl as Karly Hert
- Dorian DeMichele as Jacqueline
- Janet Cresson as Debbie
- Nathan Conner as Scott
- Beth Herbert as Sarah
- Tom Curtis as Dr. Allen
- Sandy Adell as Dr. Jones
- Debbie Kunz as Carol
- Collin Spencer as T. Bates
- David M. Ames as Dr. Jakobs
- Stacy Brickson as Dr. Collins
- John Apple as Plant Manager
- Glenn Fahlstrom as Peter Anderson
- Robert Irvine as Dr. Wheeler
- Jeff Jaeckle as Dr. Rosen
- Torrey Jaeckle as Business Man
- Jan M. Janssen as Dr. Gardner
- Ilka Hoffins as Sally Dobson
- Tom Lodewyck as Dr. Smith
- Marcia Meise as Shirley
- Scott Miles as Dr. Murphy
- Dawn Miller-Johnson as Dr. Simmons
- Doug Phillips as Pharmacist
- Kathleen M. Ross as Liz
- Joan Rubens as Betty
- Mimi Sagadin as Katie

== Production ==
The film was shot in 18 days in the summer of 2004 on a budget of $190,000. The film was written and directed by former pharmaceutical sales representative Kathleen Slattery-Moschkau. The movie is a semi-autobiographical account of Slattery-Moschkau's decade of work in the pharmaceutical industry. Katherine Heigl served as the film's executive producer.

== Home media ==
In 2009, New Line and Warner Bros. released the film to DVD.

== Reception ==
The film was praised after its premiere at Cinequest Film Festival and subsequent screenings and featured on the cover of USA Today and in the Health section as well as other positive and critical reviews before it was picked up by Warner Brothers. Later, the film received mixed to negative reviews, it received an approval rating of 11% on Rotten Tomatoes based on 9 reviews.
