= Muhammad Yunus =

Bangladeshi economist and statesman (born 1940)

- মুহাম্মদ ইউনূস
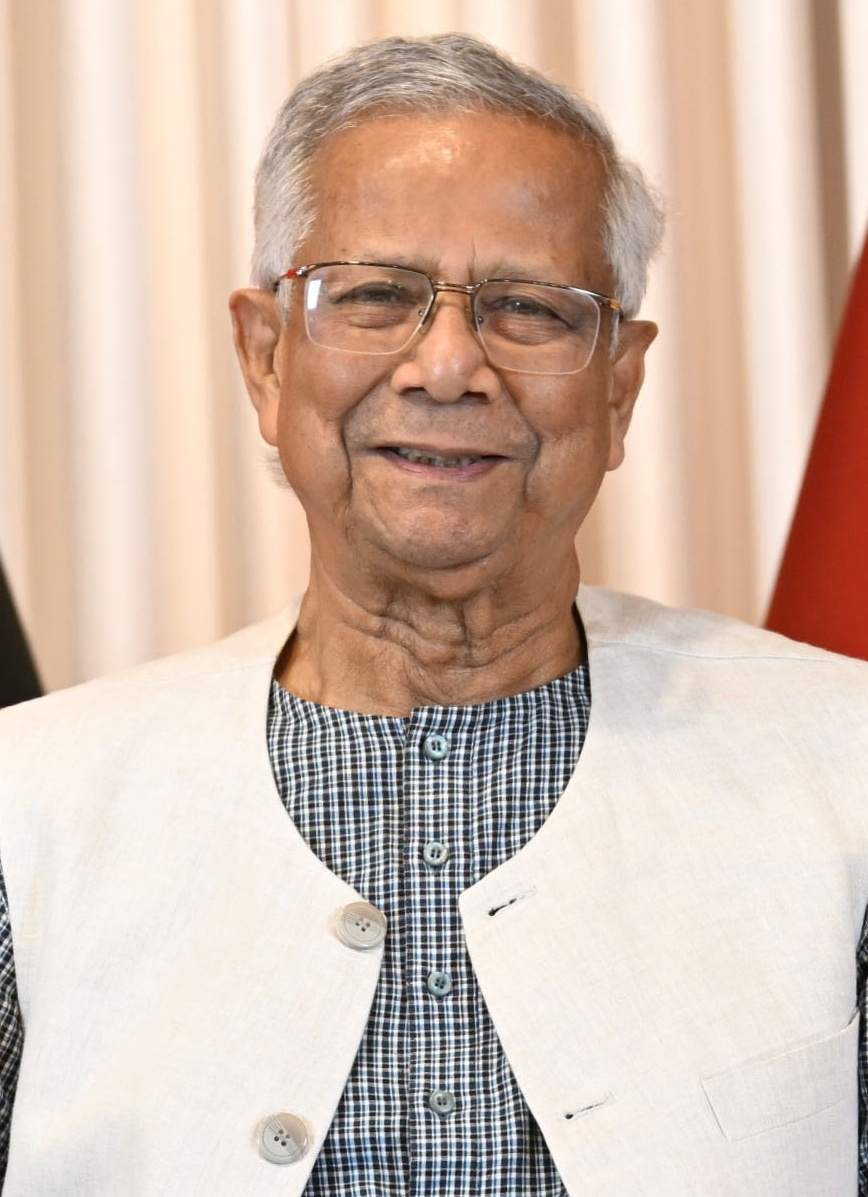
- Yunus in 2026

Chief Adviser of Bangladesh
- In office 8 August 2024 – 17 February 2026
- President: Mohammed Shahabuddin
- Preceded by: Sheikh Hasina (as Prime Minister)
- Succeeded by: Tarique Rahman (as Prime Minister)

Adviser for Primary and Mass Education
- In office 3 April 1996 – 23 June 1996
- Chief Adviser: Muhammad Habibur Rahman
- Preceded by: Khaleda Zia
- Succeeded by: Abu Sharaf Hizbul Qader Sadique

Adviser for Environment, Forest and Climate Change
- In office 3 April 1996 – 23 June 1996
- Chief Adviser: Muhammad Habibur Rahman
- Preceded by: Abdullah Al Noman
- Succeeded by: Syeda Sajeda Chowdhury

Adviser for Science and Technology
- In office 3 April 1996 – 23 June 1996
- Chief Adviser: Muhammad Habibur Rahman
- Preceded by: Rafiqul Islam Miah
- Succeeded by: Abu Sharaf Hizbul Qader Sadique

Personal details
- Born: 28 June 1940 (age 86) Hathazari, Bengal Province, British India
- Citizenship: British subject (1940–1947); Pakistan (1947–1971); Bangladesh (since 1971)
- Party: Independent (2007–present)
- Other political affiliations: Nagorik Shakti (2007)
- Spouses: Vera Forostenko (m. 1970; div. 1977); Afrozi Yunus (m. 1980)
- Children: 2, including Monica
- Relatives: Muhammad Ibrahim (brother)
- Education: University of Dhaka (BA, MA) Vanderbilt University (PhD)
- Occupation: Economist; Entrepreneur; Statesman; Civil society leader
- Awards: Olympic Laurel (2020); Congressional Gold Medal (2010); Presidential Medal of Freedom (2009); Nobel Peace Prize (2006); Independence Award (1987); (Full list)
- Website: muhammadyunus.org

Academic work
- Discipline: Economics
- School or tradition: Microcredit; Social business
- Institutions: Chittagong College; University of Dhaka; University of Chittagong; Middle Tennessee State University; Glasgow Caledonian University
- Notable works: Grameen Bank; Microcredit; Social business

Muhammad Yunus (Bengali: মুহাম্মদ ইউনূস; born 28 June 1940) is a Bangladeshi economist and statesman. Yunus pioneered the modern concept of microcredit and microfinance, for which he was awarded the Nobel Peace Prize in 2006. He is the founder of Grameen Bank and the first Bangladeshi to win the Nobel Peace Prize. Following the July Uprising, he was appointed as the 5th chief adviser of Bangladesh, the head of the interim government, serving from 2024 to 2026.

Born in Hathazari, Chittagong, Yunus passed his matriculation and intermediate examinations from Chittagong Collegiate School and Chittagong College, respectively. He completed his BA from University of Dhaka and joined as a lecturer in Chittagong College. He obtained his PhD in economics from Vanderbilt University in the United States.

After the famine of 1974, Yunus started to work on poverty alleviation in Bangladesh. He began experimenting with microfinance in the late 1970s. In 1983, the Grameen Bank was established. The success of the Grameen microfinance model inspired similar efforts in about 100 developing countries and even in developed countries including the United States.

Yunus was awarded the Nobel Peace Prize in 2006 for founding the Grameen Bank and pioneering the concepts of microcredit and microfinance. Yunus has received several other national and international honors, including the United States Presidential Medal of Freedom in 2009 and the Congressional Gold Medal in 2010.

In 2012, Yunus became Chancellor of Glasgow Caledonian University in Scotland, a position he held until 2018. Previously, he was a professor of economics at Chittagong University in Bangladesh. He published several books related to his finance work. He is a founding board member of Grameen America and Grameen Foundation, which supports microcredit. Yunus also served in the board of directors of the United Nations Foundation, a public charity to support UN causes, from 1998 to 2021.

Following the resignation of Sheikh Hasina, President Mohammed Shahabuddin gave Yunus a mandate to form an interim government, acceding to calls from Students Against Discrimination for his appointment. His government appointed a Constitutional Reform Commission and National Consensus Commission to draft revisions to the Constitution of Bangladesh, and also hold the 2026 general election and constitutional referendum on the July Charter alongside the election.

His name was listed in The 500 Most Influential Muslims in 2024. In 2025, he was named one of Time Magazine's 100 Most Influential People in the World.

== Early life and education ==
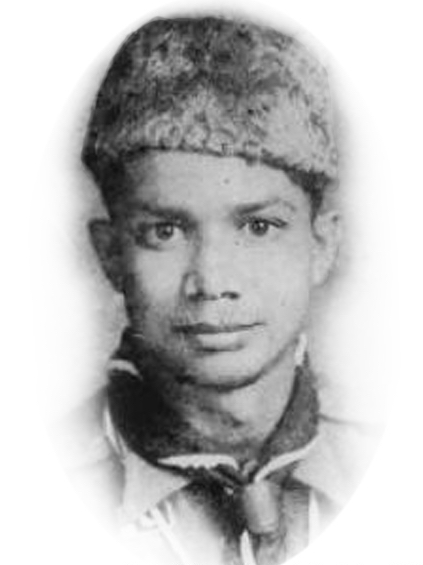
Yunus as a Boy Scout, in 1953

The third of nine children, Muhammad Yunus was born on 28 June 1940 to a Bengali Muslim family of Saudagars in the village of Bathua, by the Kaptai road at Hathazari in the Chittagong District of Bengal Presidency (now in Bangladesh). His father was Haji Muhammad Dula Mia Saudagar, a Sufi jeweller, and his mother was Sufia Khatun. His early childhood was spent in the village. In 1944, his family moved to the city of Chittagong, and he moved from his village school to Lamabazar Primary School. By 1949, his mother was afflicted with psychological illness. Later, he passed the matriculation examination from Chittagong Collegiate School ranking 16th out of 39,000 students in East Pakistan. During his school years, he was an active Boy Scout, and travelled to West Pakistan and India in 1952, and to Canada in 1955 to attend Jamborees. Later, while Yunus was studying at Chittagong College, he became active in cultural activities and won awards for drama. In 1957, he enrolled in the Department of Economics at Dhaka University and completed his BA in 1960 and MA in 1961.

== Career ==
=== Early career ===
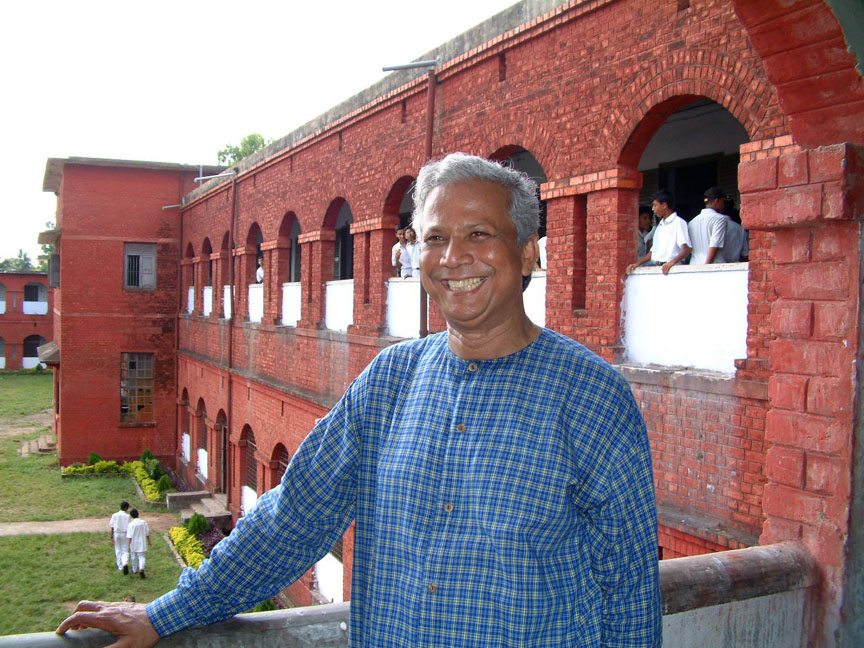
Yunus visiting Chittagong Collegiate School, in 2003

After his graduation, Yunus joined the Bureau of Economics at Dhaka University as a research assistant to economists Nurul Islam and Rehman Sobhan. Later, he was appointed lecturer in economics in Chittagong College in 1961. During that time, he also set up a profitable packaging factory on the side. In 1965, he received a Fulbright scholarship to study in the United States. He obtained his PhD in economics from Vanderbilt University through their Graduate Program in Economic Development in 1969. From 1969 to 1972, Yunus was an assistant professor of economics at Middle Tennessee State University in Murfreesboro.

During the Bangladesh Liberation War in 1971, Yunus founded a citizen's committee and ran the Bangladesh Information Center, with other Bangladeshis in the United States, to raise support for liberation. He also published the Bangladesh Newsletter from his home in Nashville. After the War, he returned to Bangladesh and was appointed to the government's Planning Commission headed by Nurul Islam. However, he found the job boring and resigned to join Chittagong University as head of the Economics department. After observing the famine of 1974, he became involved in poverty reduction and established a rural economic programme as a research project. In 1975, he developed a Nabajug Tebhaga Khamar (lit. 'New Era Three-share Farm') which the government adopted as the Packaged Input Programme. To make the project more effective, Yunus and his associates proposed the Gram Sarkar (lit. 'Village government') programme. Introduced by President Ziaur Rahman in the late 1970s, the government formed 40,392 village governments as a fourth layer of government in 2003. On 2 August 2005, in response to a petition by Bangladesh Legal Aid and Services Trust (BLAST), the High Court declared village governments illegal and unconstitutional.

His concept of microcredit for supporting innovators in multiple developing countries also inspired programmes such as the Info lady Social Entrepreneurship Programme.

=== Grameen and microfinance ===
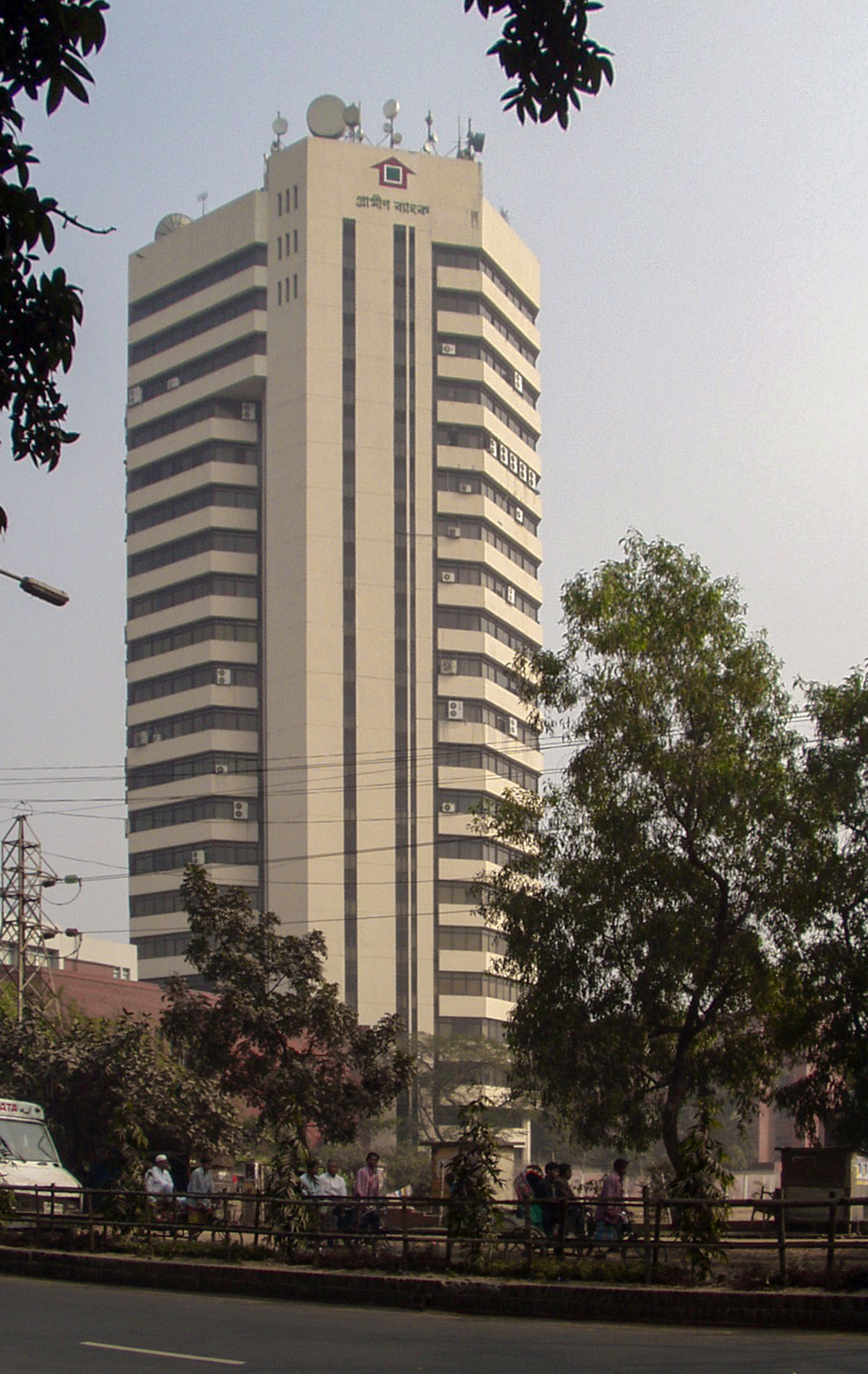
Grameen Bank Head Office at Mirpur-2, Dhaka

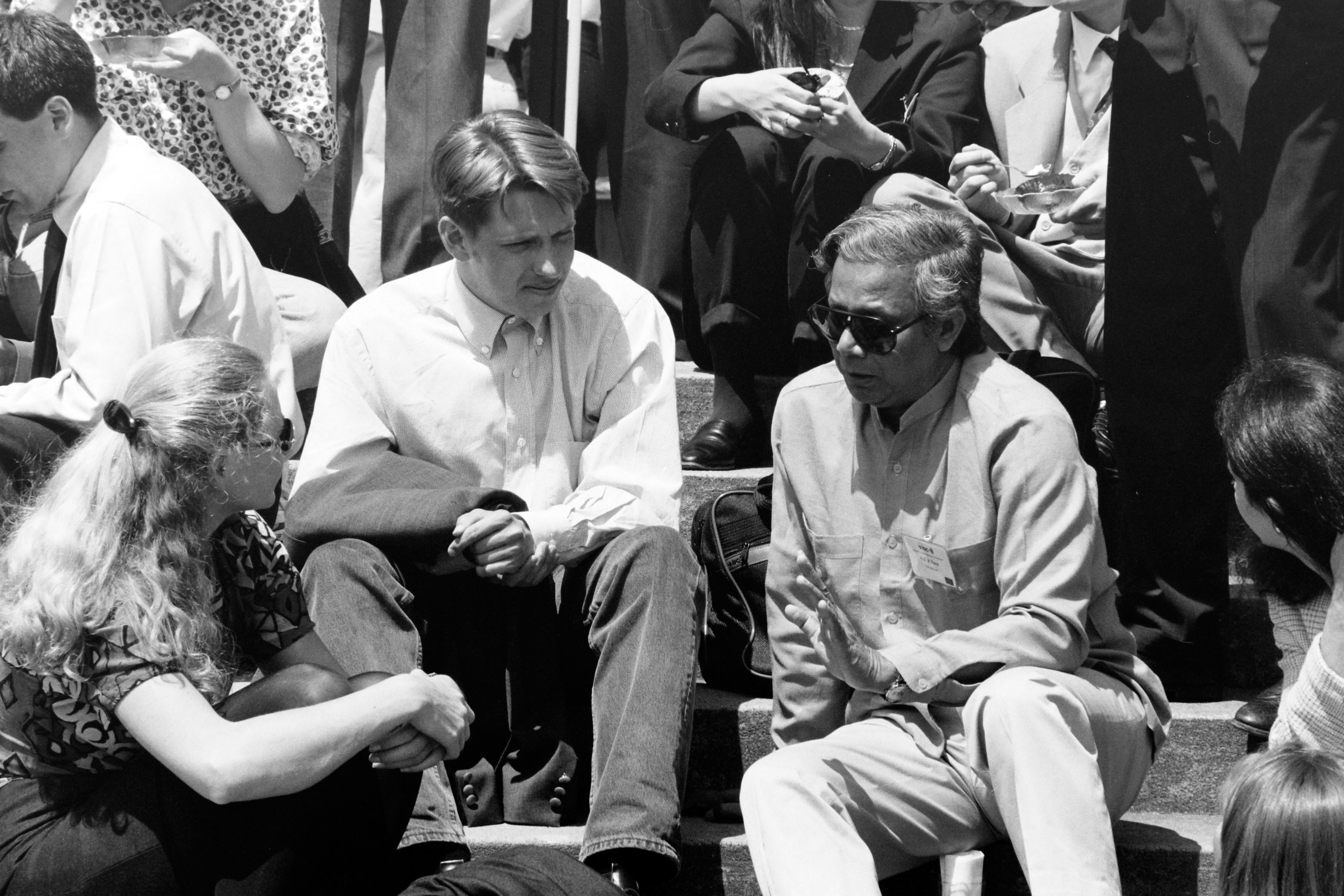
Muhammad Yunus in conversation with the participants of a management workshop at the University of St. Gallen, Switzerland (1995)

In 1976, during visits to the poorest households in the village of Jobra near Chittagong University, Yunus discovered that very small loans could make a disproportionate difference to a poor person. Village women who made bamboo furniture had to take usurious loans to buy bamboo, and repay their profits to the lenders. Traditional banks did not want to make tiny loans at reasonable interest to the poor due to high risk of default. But Yunus believed that, given the chance, the poor will not need to pay high interest on the money, can keep any profits from their own labour, and hence microcredit was a viable business model. Yunus lent US$27 of his money to 42 women in the village, who made a profit of BDT 0.50 (US$0.02) each on the loan. Thus, Yunus is credited with the idea of microcredit.

In December 1976, Yunus secured a loan from the government owned Janata Bank to lend to the poor in Jobra. The institution continued to operate, securing loans from other banks for its projects. By 1982, it had 28,000 members. On 1 October 1983, the pilot project began operation as a full-fledged bank for poor Bangladeshis and was renamed Grameen Bank ("Village Bank"). By July 2007, Grameen had issued US$6.38 billion to 7.4 million borrowers. To ensure repayment, the bank uses a system of "solidarity groups". These small informal groups apply together for loans and its members act as co-guarantors of repayment and support one another's efforts at economic self-advancement.

In the late 1980s, Grameen started to diversify by attending to underutilized fishing ponds and irrigation pumps like deep tube wells. In 1989, these diversified interests started growing into separate organisations. The fisheries project became Grameen Motsho ("Grameen Fisheries Foundation") and the irrigation project became Grameen Krishi ("Grameen Agriculture Foundation"). In time, the Grameen initiative grew into a multi-faceted group of profitable and non-profit ventures, including major projects like Grameen Trust and Grameen Fund, which runs equity projects like Grameen Software Limited, Grameen CyberNet Limited, and Grameen Knitwear Limited, as well as Grameen Telecom, which has a stake in Grameenphone (GP), the biggest private phone company in Bangladesh. From its start in March 1997 to 2007, GP's Village Phone (Polli Phone) project had brought cell-phone ownership to 260,000 rural poor in over 50,000 villages.

In 1974 we ended up with a famine in the country. People were dying of hunger and not having enough to eat. And that's a terrible situation to see around you. And I was feeling terrible that here I teach elegant theories of economics, and those theories are of no use at the moment with the people who are going hungry. So I wanted to see if as a person, as a human being, I could be of some use to some people.

— Muhammad Yunus while talking about reason behind creating Grameen Bank

The success of the Grameen microfinance model inspired similar efforts in about 100 developing countries and even in developed countries including the United States. Many microcredit projects retain Grameen's emphasis of lending to women. More than 94% of Grameen loans have gone to women, who suffer disproportionately from poverty and who are more likely than men to devote their earnings to their families.

For his work with Grameen, Yunus was named an Ashoka: Innovators for the Public Global Academy Member in 2001. According to Rashidul Bari, the Grameen's social business model has gone from being theory to an inspiring practice adopted globally by leading universities, entrepreneurs, social business and corporations.

The Yunus Centre, located in Dhaka, Bangladesh, is a think tank focused on social business, poverty alleviation, and sustainability. Founded in 2008 and chaired by Yunus, it promotes his philosophy of social business and serves as a resource center for related initiatives. The centre's activities include poverty eradication campaigns, research and publications, support for social business start-ups, organizing the Global Social Business Summit, and developing academic programs on social business with international universities.

=== International career ===
In July 2007, in Johannesburg, South Africa, Nelson Mandela, Graça Machel and Desmond Tutu convened a group of world leaders "to contribute their wisdom, independent leadership and integrity to tackle some of the world's toughest problems." Nelson Mandela announced the formation of this new group, The Elders, in a speech he delivered on the occasion of his 89th birthday. Yunus attended the launch of the group and was one of its founding members. He stepped down as an Elder in September 2009, stating that he was unable to do justice to his membership due to the demands of his work.

Yunus is a member of the Africa Progress Panel (APP), a group of ten distinguished individuals who advocate at the highest levels for equitable and sustainable development in Africa. Every year, the Panel releases a report, the Africa Progress Report, that outlines an issue of immediate importance to the continent and suggests a set of associated policies. In July 2009, Yunus became a member of the SNV Netherlands Development Organisation International Advisory Board to support the organisation's poverty reduction work. Since 2010, Yunus has served as a Commissioner for the Broadband Commission for Digital Development, a UN initiative which seeks to use broadband internet services to accelerate social and economic development. In March 2016, he was appointed by United Nations Secretary-General Ban Ki-moon to the High-Level Commission on Health Employment and Economic Growth, which was co-chaired by presidents François Hollande of France and Jacob Zuma of South Africa. Following the Rohingya genocide in 2016–2017, Yunus urged Myanmar to end violence against Rohingya Muslims.

== Early political career ==
For many years, Yunus remained a follower of Hasina's father, Sheikh Mujibur Rahman, Former President of Bangladesh. While teaching at Middle Tennessee State University, Yunus founded the Bangladesh Citizens' Committee (BCC) as a response to West Pakistan's aggression against Bangladesh. After the outbreak of the war of liberation, the BCC selected Yunus to become editor of its Bangladesh News Letter. Inspired by the birth of Bangladesh in 1971, Yunus returned home in 1972. The relationship continued after Mujib's death.

=== Adviser to the caretaker government ===
In 1996, Muhammad Yunus served as an advisor to the caretaker government led by former Chief Justice Muhammad Habibur Rahman. He was responsible for overseeing the Ministry of Primary and Mass Education, the Ministry of Science and Technology, and the Ministry of Environment and Forests.

=== Nagorik Shakti ===
In early 2006, Yunus, along with other members of the civil society including Rehman Sobhan, Muhammad Habibur Rahman, Kamal Hossain, Matiur Rahman, Mahfuz Anam and Debapriya Bhattacharya, participated in a campaign for honest and clean candidates in national elections. He considered entering politics in the later part of that year. On 11 February 2007, Yunus wrote an open letter, published in the Bangladeshi newspaper The Daily Star, where he asked citizens for views on his plan to float a political party to establish political goodwill, proper leadership and good governance. In the letter, he called on everyone to briefly outline how he should go about the task and how they can contribute to it. Yunus finally announced that he is willing to launch a political party tentatively called Nagorik Shakti (lit. 'Citizens' Power') on 18 February 2007. There was speculation that the army supported a move by Yunus into politics. On 3 May, however, Yunus declared that he had decided to abandon his political plans following a meeting with the head of the caretaker government, Fakhruddin Ahmed.

== Chief Adviser of Bangladesh (2024–2026) ==
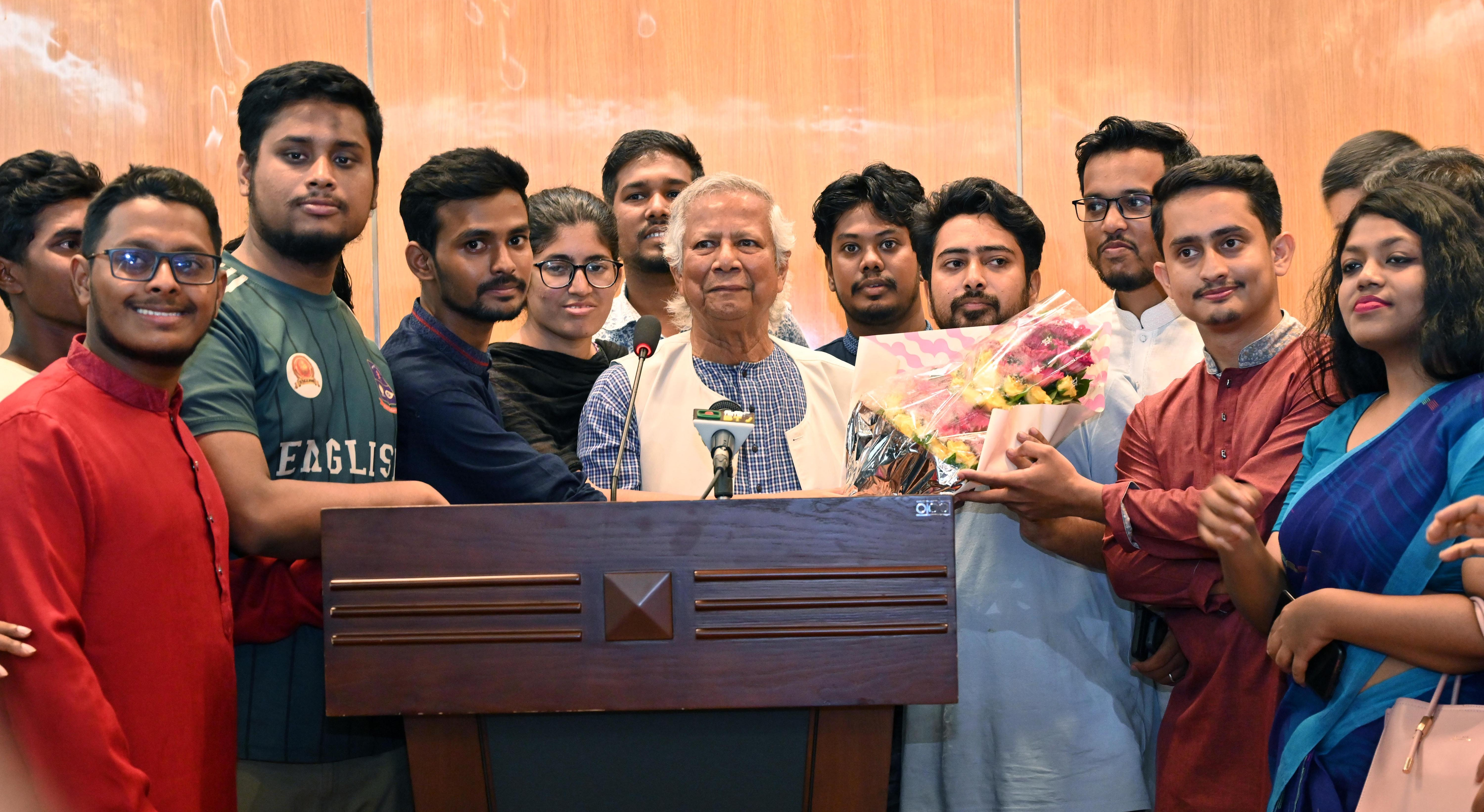
Yunus received by the Students Against Discrimination coordinators upon his arrival in Bangladesh on 8 August 2024

In July 2024, amidst the July Uprising in Bangladesh, Yunus expressed support for the students and his distaste of the current government, and in August 2024, after the Resignation of Sheikh Hasina it was announced that Yunus would be chief adviser of the Interim government. While the Constitution of Bangladesh has not provided for an interim government since 2011, the government is deemed legitimate due to the doctrine of necessity. Bangladeshi courts have taken the line that Hasina's resignation created a situation for which there was no constitutional remedy. Not only does the Bangladeshi legal system no longer account for transfers of power, but there was an urgent need to oversee state affairs.

On 8 August 2024 President Mohammed Shahabuddin appointed Yunus as the Chief Adviser of Bangladesh and later Yunus along with 20 Cabinet Advisers, 8 Special Positions and 5 Special Assistants took oath and the Interim government was formed. After the oath, he visited injured people in Dhaka Medical College. On 10 August 2024, he visited the home and family members of Abu Sayed. He also visited injured student protesters in the Rangpur Medical College. Following communal violence after Hasina's resignation, Yunus threatened to resign if the violence continued and vowed to crack down on conspirators of the attacks.

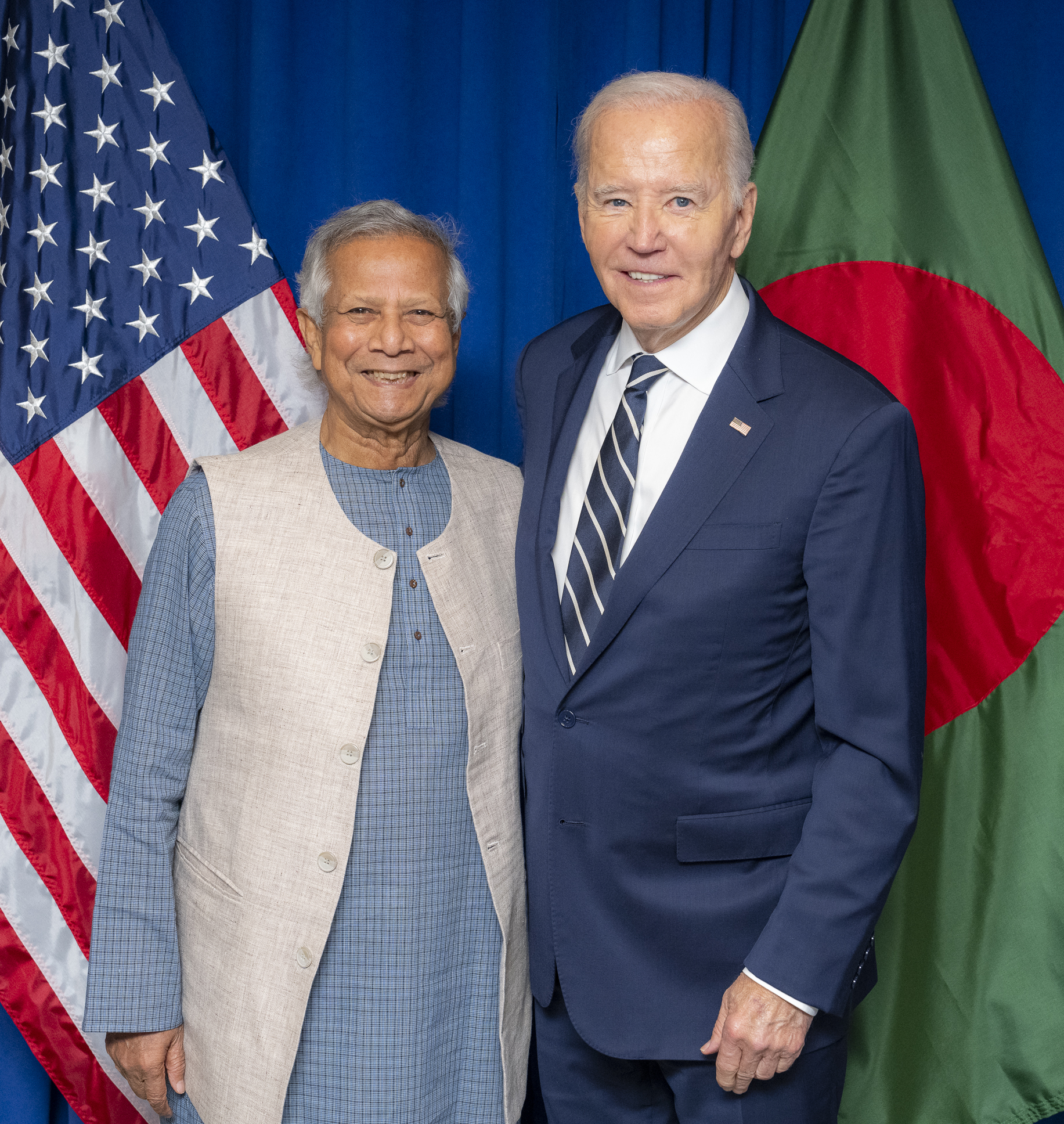
President Joe Biden with Chief Adviser Muhammad Yunus at the U.N. Headquarters in New York City

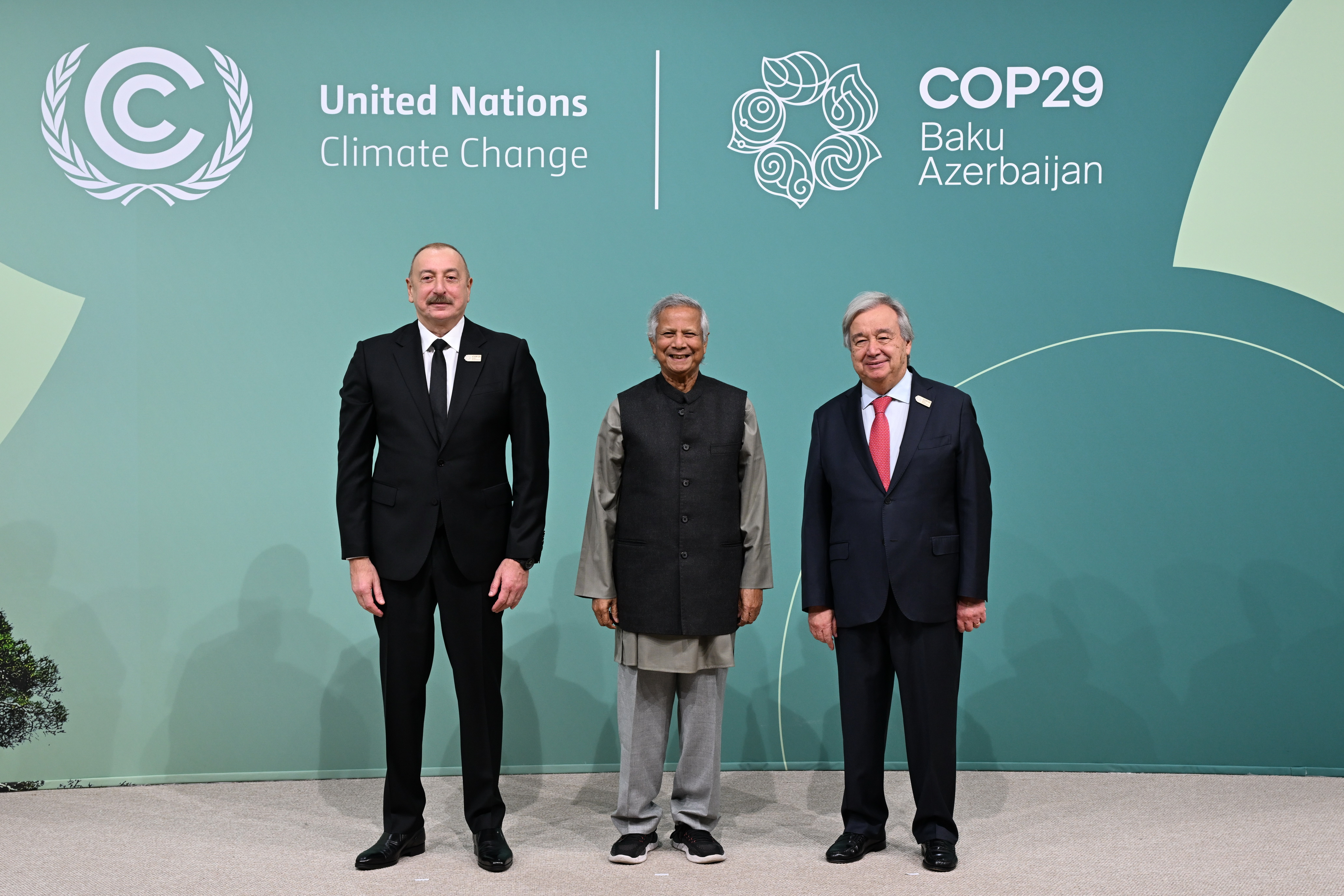
Chief Adviser Muhammad Yunus (middle) with President of Azerbaijan Ilham Aliyev (left) and the Secretary-general of the United Nations António Guterres (right) at COP29, 11 November 2024

As Chief Adviser, Yunus has pledged to continue providing humanitarian aid to Rohingya refugees in Bangladesh and support the garment industry amid disruptions caused by the unrest prior to his appointment.

On 16 December 2024, Yunus announced that general elections would be held in late 2025 or early 2026. On 5 August 2025, Yunus requested the Bangladesh Election Commission to organize the election before Ramadan 2026, which will begin as early as 17 February.

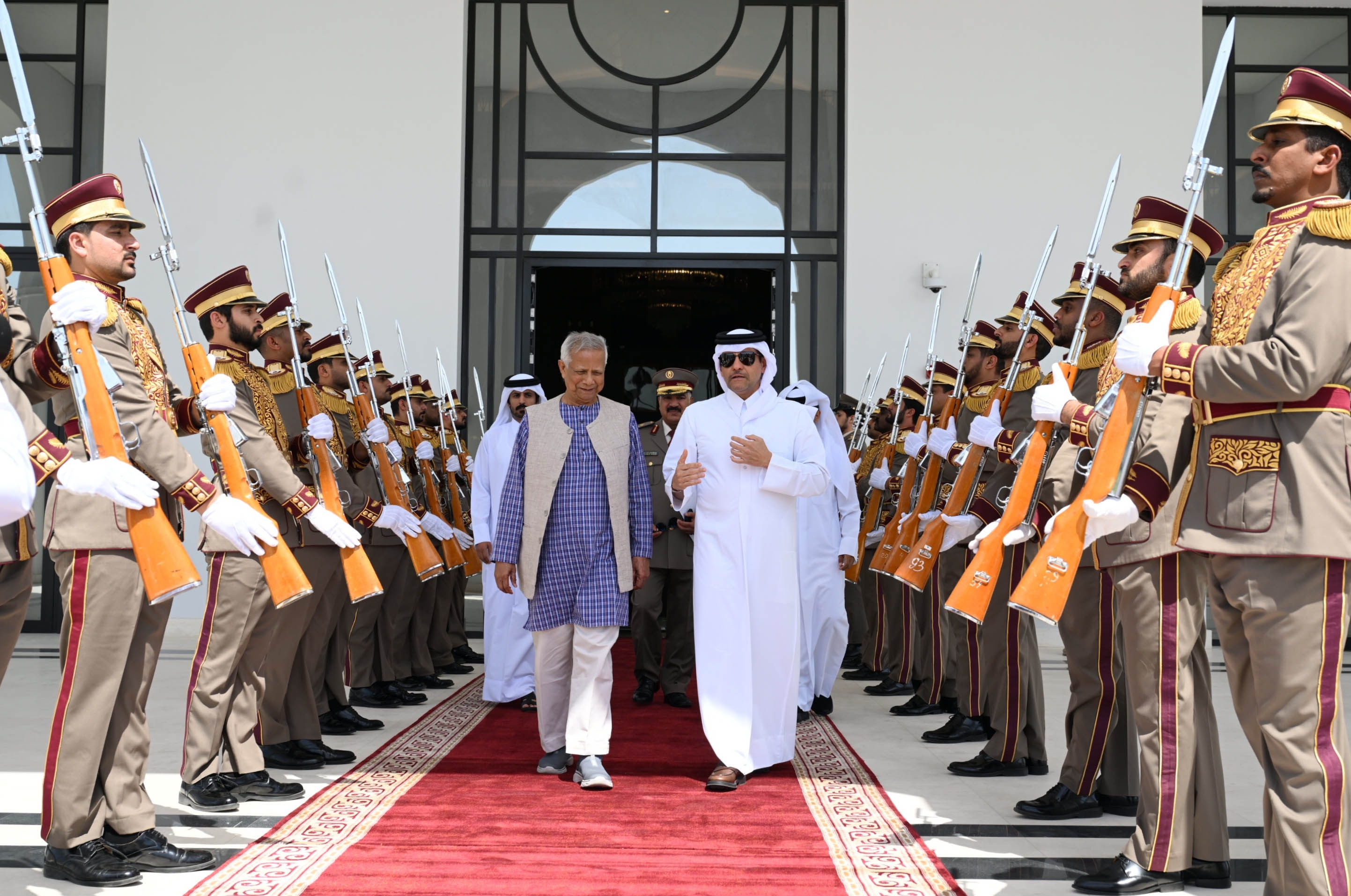
Muhammad Yunus received a Guard Of Honor from the Qatar Armed Forces

In March 2025, Yunus announced that Bangladesh would finalize a commercial agreement with SpaceX's Starlink within three months. The initiative aims to deliver reliable satellite internet across the nation and prevent political disruptions from leading to internet blackouts, as happened in the past. Yunus emphasized that satellite internet through Starlink would allow broader access to education, health services, and entrepreneurship, especially in rural and underserved regions. He also expressed interest in collaborating with Elon Musk to unlock Bangladesh's potential through digital innovation.

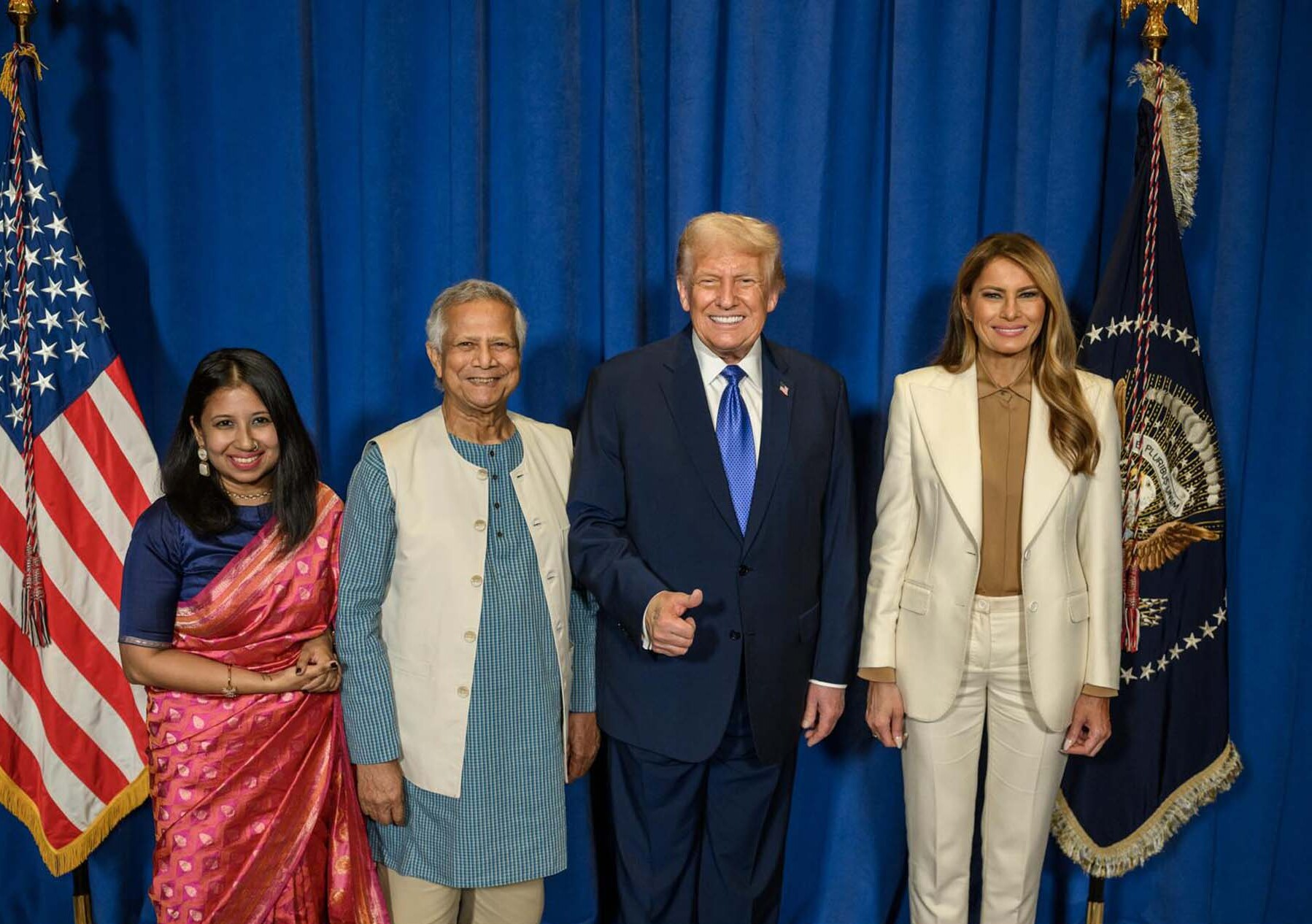
Chief Adviser Muhammad Yunus with his daughter Dina Yunus at a reception hosted by U.S. President Donald Trump and First Lady Melania Trump in New York, 27 September 2025.

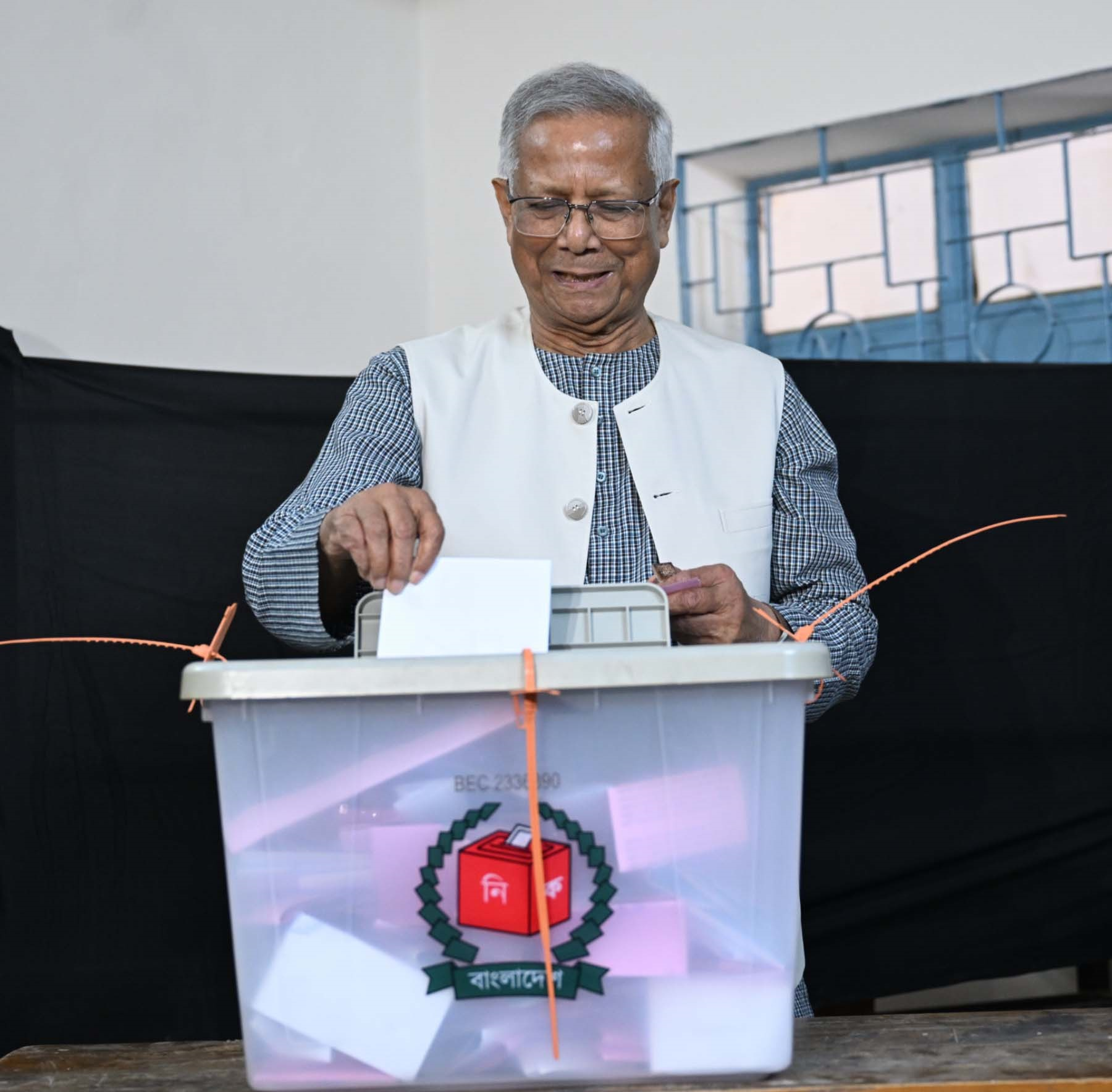
Yunus casting his ballot in the 13th General elections in Bangladesh

In April 2025, Yunus addressed the 81st session of the United Nations Economic and Social Commission for Asia and the Pacific reaffirming Bangladesh's commitment to building a climate-resilient and inclusive digital economy. He highlighted the government's investments in green infrastructure, sustainable housing, and nature-based solutions to support vulnerable populations.

The administration has been criticised for their inability to maintain law and order during the start of their term, but has been praised for restoring democratic rights such as the freedom of press, freedom of speech and improved foreign relations as well as the implementation of key reforms which led to a high approval rating. He left the government residence on February 28, 2026, after completing his duties as Chief Adviser of Bangladesh.

Throughout Yunus' interim administration, his government was accused of failing to protect Bangladesh's minority communities which includes Hindus, Buddhists, and Christians from acts of religious violence. In April 2025, Shri Bhabesh Chandra Roy, a Hindu minority leader in Bangladesh was abducted from his residence and beaten to death. India’s Ministry of External Affairs condemned the killing, describing it as part of a "pattern of systematic persecution" of Hindu minorities under the Bangladeshi interim government.

In March 2026, Rights & Risks Analysis Group (RRAG), a human rights think tank based in Delhi had appealed to the United Nations to interfere on its behalf to prevent Yunus's government from "emboldening the religious fundamentalists in his country by denying attacks on minorities in his country." According to a Bangladeshi minority rights organization

In January and February, 92 incidents of violence targeting minorities and indigenous communities have occurred, including 11 murders, three cases of rape, 25 attacks on temples, one allegation of religious disrespect, six attacks on indigenous communities, 38 incidents of attacks, vandalism, and looting of homes and businesses, two cases of job dismissals, and six other attacks

— Bangladesh Hindu Buddhist Christian Unity Council (BHBCUC)

Yunus' response to the state of affairs was that it was "exaggerated propaganda" aimed at destabilizing Bangladesh.

=== Reforms under Muhammad Yunus's administration ===
==== July Charter ====
The administration created the July Charter, which is a political declaration based on a consensus reached by 30 political parties for constitutional, administrative and electoral reforms.

==== Creation of a bicameral parliament (senate) ====
The consensus was reached in discussions of the July Charter for the creation of two separate houses. The Jatiya Sangsad with 400 members and a newly formed upper house (senate) with 100 members elected through Proportional representation and 5 members appointed by the president.

The senate cannot introduce legislation but can review and suggest amendments and delay bills passed by the national assembly.

==== Unified public transport system ====
The administration announced that all buses in the capital city of Dhaka will be brought under a unified system, following regulations and routes set by the government to create an efficient and functioning public transport system and prevent chaos.

==== Traffic signals and road safety laws implementation ====
The administration implemented semi-automatic traffic signals at key intersections of the capital city and announced plans to implement traffic signals on a wide scale in Dhaka.

A real time traffic monitoring centre was also launched in Dhaka, and it is equipped with advanced ITS technologies, such as real-time traffic monitoring, vehicle speed tracking, data analysis, and incident management.

==== NHRC's emergence as a powerful organization ====
The administration gave the National Human Rights Commission of Bangladesh new powers in order to enable it to become a more powerful organization.

Since 2009 under the government of Sheikh Hasina banned the NHRC from investigating members of law enforcement, which was removed through the ordinance issued by Yunus's government.

The ordinance grants the organization new duties and powers such as investigation, prosecution, legal representation of complainants. The new ordinance allows the organization to arrest and investigate suspects regardless of rank or political position independently. The ordinance also gives the organization new powers such as visiting and searching facilities to identify secret detention centres. It can also issue warrants to inspect prisons or other premises where enforced disappearances could have taken place.

The rights commission can also authorise law enforcers to make arrests with the ordinance stating investigating officers cannot be part of the organization that is being investigated.

==== Increased police accountability ====
Due to the Bangladesh Police's history of committing human rights abuses, especially during the July Uprising, the Yunus administration vowed to make the police an accountable and just force.

A police reform commission was formed which suggested introducing clear-walled interrogation rooms in every police station to eliminate the risk of custodial torture. To prevent enforced disappearances, the introduction of GPS trackers and bodycams was recommended along with the introduction of an independent police commission for accountability.

The government announced the procurement of 40,000 bodycams for the police to promote accountability for the upcoming 2026 Bangladeshi general election.

==== Legal system reforms (introduction of pre-litigation mediation, digital legal aid launch) ====
The government launched mandatory pre-litigation mediation (formal or informal process where a neutral third party, a mediator, helps disputing parties reach a resolution before a formal lawsuit is filed in court).

The government also launched e-family courts (a new digital system for conducting family court proceedings entirely online).

The Yunus government also introduced a digital legal aid program which offers free legal assistance to underprivileged communities. Legal aid aims to make justice faster, fairer, and more accessible.

Law adviser Asif Nazrul stated, "If implemented successfully, the amended legal aid system has the potential to transform lives. By expanding mediation and bringing justice closer to people, especially those who cannot afford lengthy litigation, we can ensure that no citizen is left without protection of the law."

== Controversies ==
=== Breakdown in relations between Hasina and Yunus (2007) ===
Yunus maintained a professional relationship with Hasina. Yunus appointed Hasina—along with U.S. First Lady Hillary Clinton—as co-chair of a microcredit summit held 2–4 February 1997. In her statement she praised, "the outstanding work done by Professor Yunus and the Grameen Bank he founded. ... The success of the Grameen Bank has created optimism about the viability of banks engaged in extending micro-credit to the poor". The inaugural ceremony of Grameen Phone, Bangladesh's largest telephone service, took place at Hasina's office on 26 March 1997. Using Grameen Phone, Hasina made the first call to Thorbjorn Jagland, the then-Norwegian prime minister. When her conversation ended, she received another call, from Laily Begum, a Grameen Phone employee.

On 11 January 2007, Army General Moeen U Ahmed staged a military intervention, and Fakhruddin Ahmed took office on 11 January 2007 as Chief Advisor saying he intended to arrange free and fair elections but also to clean up corruption. While Khaleda Zia and Hasina criticised Fakruddin and claimed that it was not his job to clean up corruption, Yunus expressed his satisfaction. In an interview with the AFP news agency, Yunus remarked "There is no ideology here." In reaction to Yunus's comments Sheikh Hasina called him a "usurer who has not only failed to eradicate poverty but has also nurtured poverty." This was Hasina's first public statement against Yunus.

The Awami League government of Sheikh Hasina campaigned against Grameen and Yunus. The New York Times reported, "Her actions appear to be retaliation for Mr. Yunus's announcement in 2007 that he would seek public office, even though he never went through with his plans". According to The Times of India, one other factor contributed to her decision against Yunus: the Nobel Peace Prize.

It was rumored that Hasina thought that she would win the Nobel Peace Prize for signing the 1997 Chittagong Hill Tracts peace treaty. On 9 March, Attorney General Mahbubey Alam expressed the government's attitude when he said, "Prime Minister Sheikh Hasina should have been awarded the Nobel Peace Prize". He went on to challenge the wisdom of the Nobel committee.

=== Dismissal from and cases against Grameen Bank (2011–2013) ===
The second Awami League government announced a review of Grameen Bank activities on 11 January 2011. In February 2011, several international leaders, such as Mary Robinson, stepped up their defence of Yunus through a number of efforts, including the founding of a formal network of supporters known as "Friends of Grameen".

On 15 February 2011, the Finance Minister of Bangladesh, Abul Maal Abdul Muhith, declared that Yunus should "stay away" from Grameen Bank while it is being investigated. On 2 March 2011, Muzammel Huq, a former Bank employee, whom the government had appointed chairman in January, announced that Yunus had been fired as managing director of the Bank. However, Bank General Manager Jannat-E Quanine issued a statement that Yunus was "continuing in his office" pending review of the legal issues surrounding the controversy.

In March 2011, Yunus petitioned the Bangladesh High Court challenging the legality of the decision by the Bangladeshi Central Bank to remove him as managing director of Grameen Bank. The same day, nine elected directors of Grameen Bank filed a second petition. U.S. Senator John Kerry expressed his support to Yunus in a statement on 5 March 2011 and declared that he was "deeply concerned" by this affair. The same day in Bangladesh, thousands of people protested and formed human chains to support Yunus. The High Court hearing on the petitions, was planned for 6 March 2011 but postponed. On 8 March 2011, the Court confirmed Yunus's dismissal.

On 2 August 2012, Sheikh Hasina approved a draft of "Grameen Bank Ordinance 2012" to increase government control over the bank. Hasina also ordered a fresh investigation into Yunus's activities and financial transactions in his later years as managing director of Grameen. The prime minister also alleged that Yunus had received his earnings without the necessary permission from the government, including his Nobel Peace Prize earnings and book royalties.

On 4 October 2013, Bangladesh's cabinet approved the draft of a new law that would give the country's central bank greater control over Grameen Bank, raising the stakes in the long-running dispute. The Grameen Bank Act 2013 was approved at a cabinet meeting chaired by Prime Minister Sheikh Hasina and was passed by parliament on 7 November 2013. It replaced the Grameen Bank Ordinance, the law that underpinned the creation of Grameen Bank as a specialised microcredit institution in 1983. 'The New York Times' reported in August 2013:

Since then, the government has started an investigation into the bank and is now planning to take over Grameen—a majority of whose shares are owned by its borrowers—and break it up into 19 regional lenders.

Vikas Bajaj wrote on 7 November 2013:

The government of Bangladesh has played its trump card in its long-running campaign against Grameen Bank and its founder Muhammad Yunus. Last week, legislators passed a law that effectively nationalizes the bank, which pioneered the idea of making small loans to poor women, by wresting control of it from the 8.4 million rural women that own a majority of its shares.

=== Legal cases and trials (2010–2024) ===
Yunus faced 174 lawsuits in Bangladesh, 172 of which were civil cases. Allegations included labour law violations, corruption, and money laundering, which Yunus alleged were politically motivated.

Hasina launched a series of trials against Yunus. The former put the latter on trial in 2010 and ultimately removed him from Grameen Bank, citing his age. The government launched the first trial against Yunus in December 2010, alleging that in 1996 he had transferred approximately $100 million to a sister company of Grameen Bank. Yunus denied the allegations and he was found innocent by the Norwegian government. In 2013, he was tried a second time, because he had supposedly received earnings without the necessary government permission, including his Nobel Peace Prize earnings and royalties from his book sales. The series of trials against Yunus puzzled figures worldwide, from the 8.3 million underprivileged women served by Grameen Bank to U.S. President Barack Obama.

On 27 January 2011, Yunus appeared in court in a food-adulteration case filed by the Dhaka City Corporation (DCC) Food Safety Court, accusing him of producing an "adulterated" yogurt whose fat content was below the legal minimum. This yogurt is produced by Grameen Danone, a social business joint venture between Grameen Bank and Danone that aims to provide opportunities for street vendors who sell the yogurt and to improve child nutrition with the nutrient-fortified yogurt. According to Yunus's lawyer, the allegations are "false and baseless".

On 1 January 2024, a court in Bangladesh sentenced Yunus to a six-month prison term, along with three employees from Grameen Telecom for labor law violations. However, the court granted bail pending appeals. Amnesty International declared Yunus's conviction a "blatant abuse" of the justice system. The conviction was overturned on 7 August 2024 following an appeal. He was acquitted in a graft case filed by the Anti-Corruption Commission (ACC) just four days after getting acquittal for the labour violations case.

=== Allegations of political targeting ===
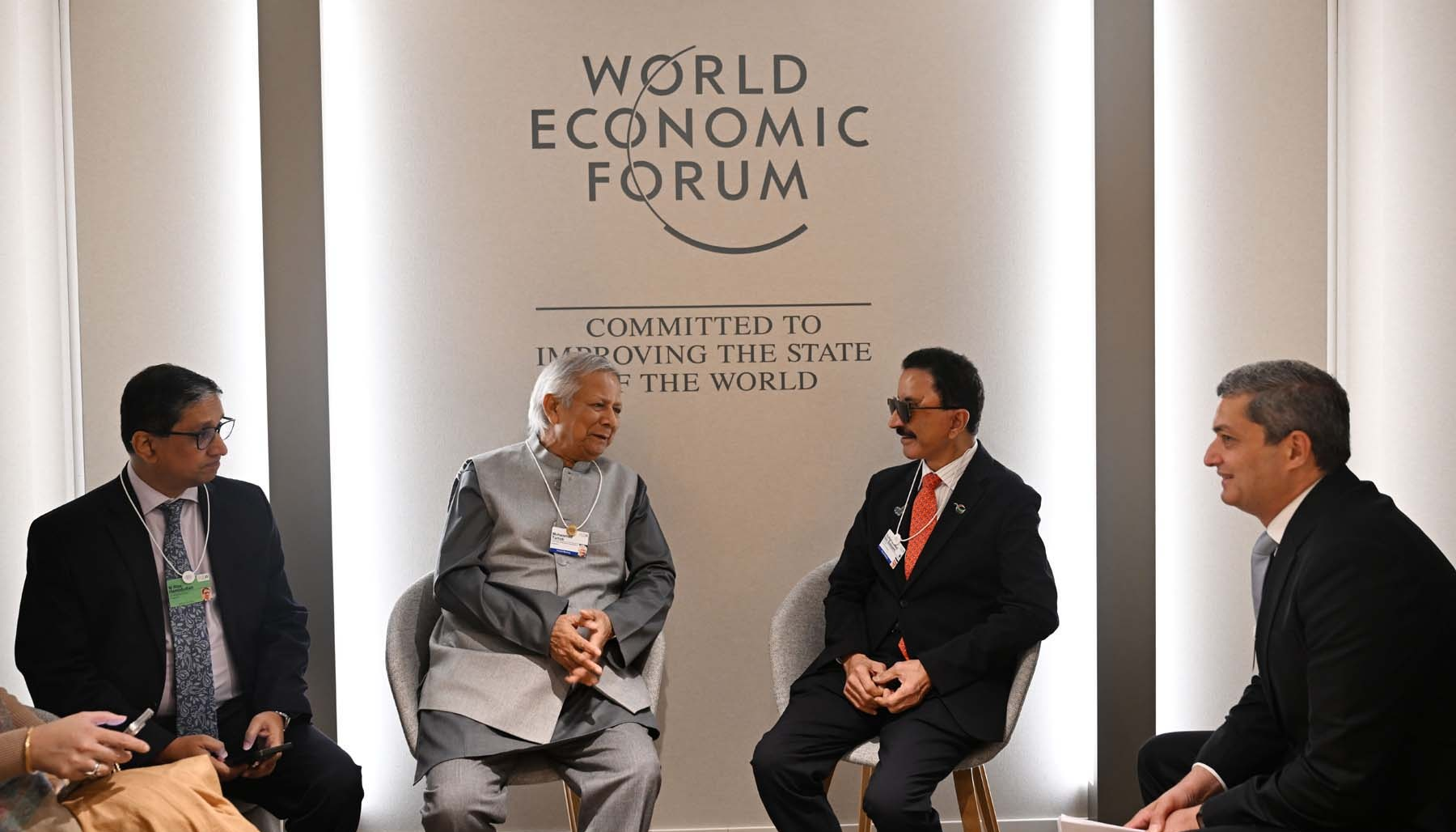
Yunus and Sultan Ahmed bin Sulayem at the 2025 World Economic Forum

In December 2010, Grameen Bank was quickly cleared by the Norwegian government of all allegations surrounding misused or misappropriated funds. Yet, in March 2011, the Bangladeshi government launched a three-month investigation of all Grameen Bank's activities. This inquiry prevented Muhammad Yunus from participating in the World Economic Forum.

In January 2011, Yunus appeared in court in a defamation case filed by a local politician from a minor left-leaning party in 2007, complaining about a statement that Yunus made to the AFP news agency, "Politicians in Bangladesh only work for power. There is no ideology here". At the hearing, Yunus was granted bail and exempted from personal appearance at subsequent hearings.

These investigations fueled suspicion that many attacks might be politically motivated, due to difficult relations between Sheikh Hasina and Yunus since early 2007, when Yunus created his own political party, an effort he dropped in May 2007. In 2013, he faced a state-backed smear campaign that accused him of being un-Islamic and promoting homosexuality, after he signed a joint statement criticising the prosecution of gay people in Uganda in 2012 with three other nobel laureates.

== Personal life ==
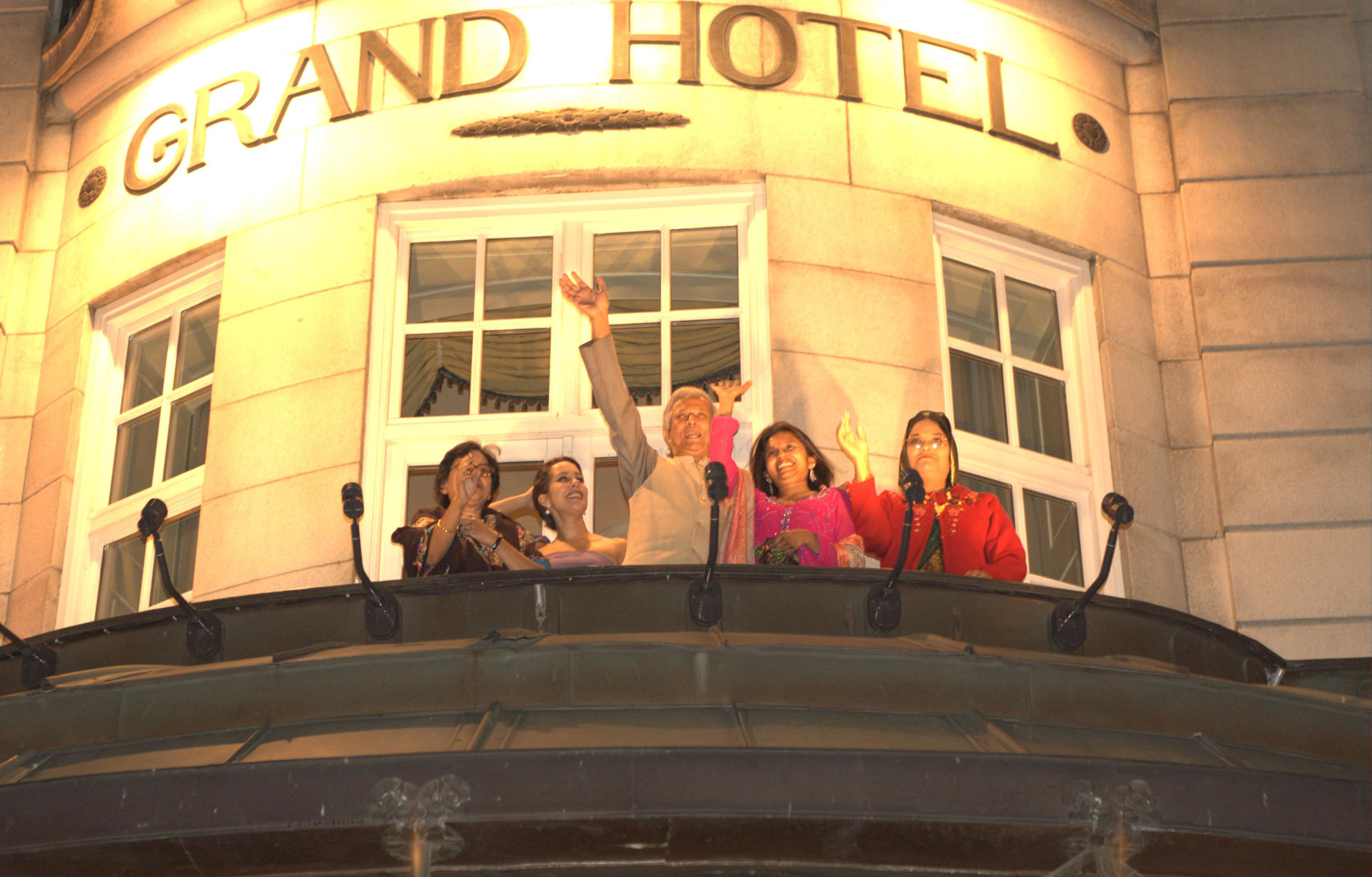
Yunus with his family members including Monica at the Grand Hotel in Oslo, Norway in 2006

Yunus identifies as a Muslim. In 1967, while Yunus attended Vanderbilt University, he met Vera Forostenko, a student of Russian literature at Vanderbilt University and daughter of Russian immigrants to Trenton, New Jersey, United States. They were married in 1970. Yunus's marriage with Vera ended within months of the birth of their baby girl, Monica Yunus, in 1977 in Chittagong, as Vera returned to New Jersey claiming that Bangladesh was not a good place to raise a baby. Monica Yunus became an operatic soprano based in New York City. Yunus later married Afrozi Yunus in 1980, who was then a researcher in physics at Manchester University. She was later appointed as a professor of physics at Jahangirnagar University. Their daughter Dina Afroz Yunus was born in 1986.

Yunus's brother Muhammad Ibrahim is a former professor of physics at the University of Dhaka and the founder of The Center for Mass Education in Science (CMES), which brings science education to adolescent girls in villages. His other brother Muhammad Jahangir (d. 2019) was a television presenter and a social activist in Bangladesh.

== Awards and recognitions ==
Yunus was awarded the 2006 Nobel Peace Prize, along with Grameen Bank, for their efforts to create economic and social development:

Muhammad Yunus has shown himself to be a leader who has managed to translate visions into practical action for the benefit of millions of people, not only in Bangladesh, but also in many other countries. Loans to poor people without any financial security had appeared to be an impossible idea. From modest beginnings three decades ago, Yunus has, first and foremost through Grameen Bank, developed micro-credit into an ever more important instrument in the struggle against poverty.

— Norwegian Nobel Committee

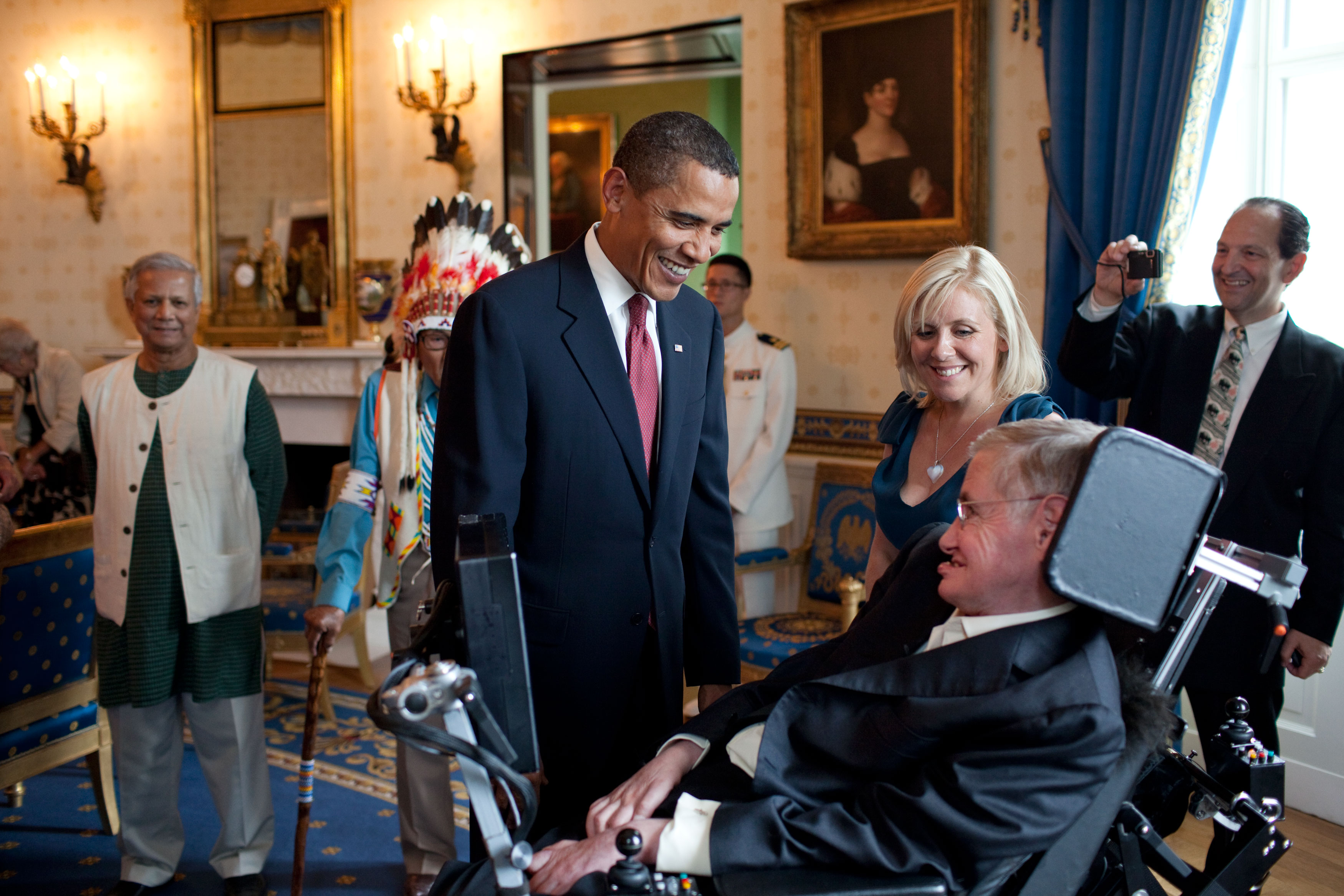
Barack Obama speaks to Stephen Hawking and on the left Yunus

Yunus was the first Bangladeshi to ever get a Nobel Prize. He established Grameen Bank in 1983, which plays a significant role in poverty alleviation in various countries of the world including Bangladesh. In 2006, he and the Grameen Bank he founded jointly won the Nobel Peace Prize. After receiving the news of the important award, Yunus announced that he would use part of his share of the $1.4 million (equivalent to $2.24 million in 2025) award money to create a company to make low-cost, high-nutrition food for the poor; while the rest would go towards establishing the Yunus Science and Technology University in his home district as well as setting up an eye hospital for the poor in Bangladesh.

Former U.S. president Bill Clinton was a vocal advocate for the awarding of the Nobel Prize to Yunus. He expressed this in Rolling Stone magazine as well as in his autobiography My Life. In a speech given at University of California, Berkeley in 2002, President Clinton described Yunus as "a man who long ago should have won the Nobel Prize [in Economics and] I'll keep saying that until they finally give it to him." Conversely, The Economist stated explicitly that while Yunus was doing excellent work to fight poverty, it was not appropriate to award him the Peace Prize, stating: "... the Nobel committee could have made a braver, more difficult, choice by declaring that there would be no recipient at all."

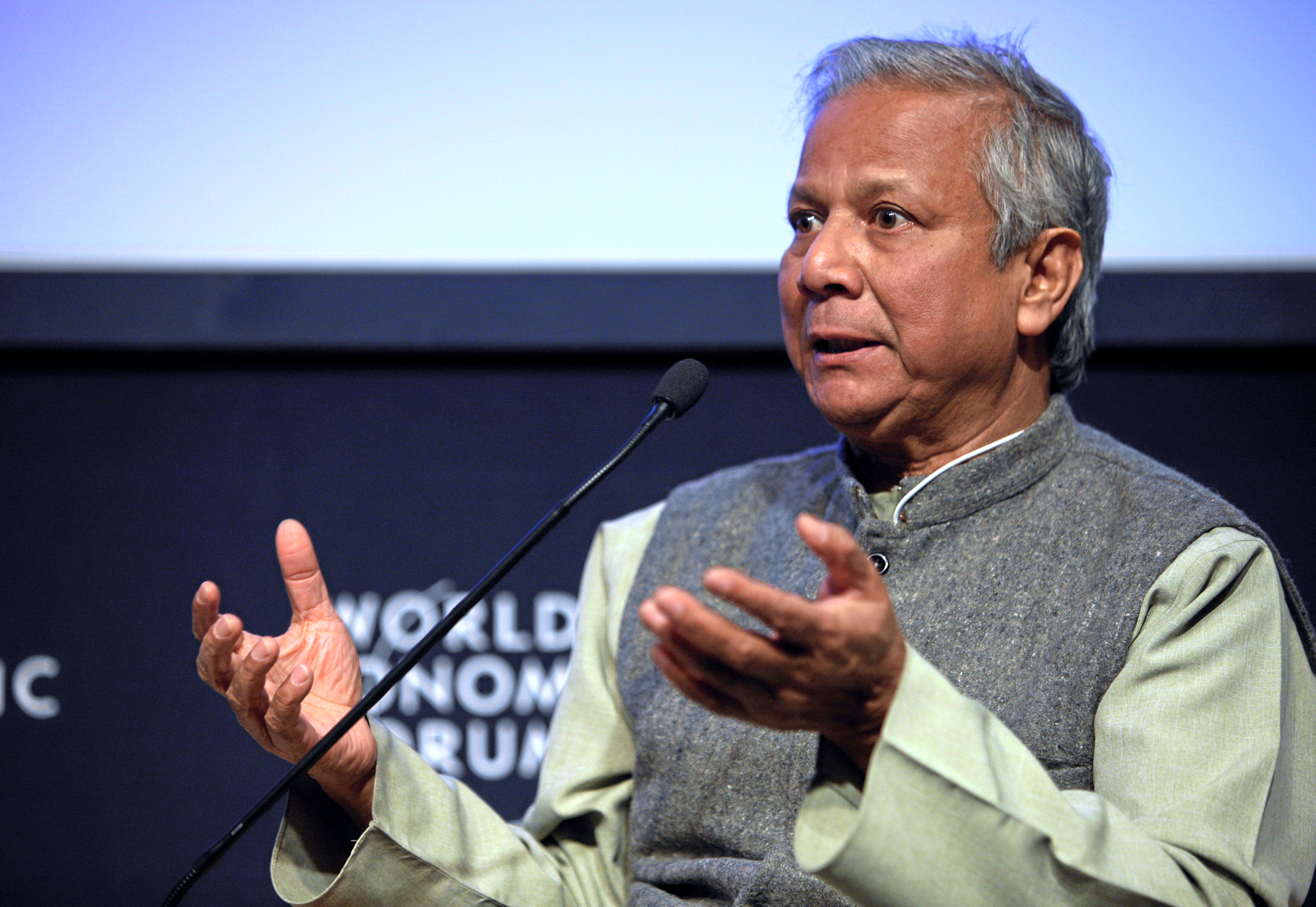
Yunus at the Annual Meeting 2009 of the World Economic Forum in Davos, Switzerland

He is one of only seven persons to have won the Nobel Peace Prize, Presidential Medal of Freedom, and the Congressional Gold Medal. Other notable awards include the Ramon Magsaysay Award in 1984, the World Food Prize, the International Simon Bolivar Prize (1996), the Prince of Asturias Award for Concord and the Sydney Peace Prize in 1998, and the Seoul Peace Prize in 2006. Additionally, Yunus has been awarded 72 honorary doctorate degrees from universities across 27 countries, and 113 international awards from 26 countries including state honours from 10 countries. Bangladesh government brought out a commemorative stamp to honour his Nobel Award. Yunus received honorary doctorate degrees from universities from Albania, Argentina, Australia, Bangladesh, Belgium, Bolivia, Brazil, Canada, Costa Rica, China, Greece, India, Italy, Ireland, Japan, Korea, Lebanon, Malaysia, Mexico, Peru, Russia, South Africa, Spain, Thailand, Turkey, the United Kingdom, and the United States. United Nations Secretary-General Ban Ki-moon invited Yunus to serve as an MDG Advocate. Yunus sits on the Board of United Nations Foundation, Schwab Foundation, Prince Albert II of Monaco Foundation, Grameen Credit Agricole Microcredit Foundation. He has been a member of Fondation Chirac's honour committee, ever since the foundation was launched in 2008 by former French president Jacques Chirac in order to promote world peace.

Yunus was named by Fortune Magazine in March 2012 as one of 12 greatest entrepreneurs of the current era. In its citation, Fortune Magazine said "Yunus' idea inspired countless numbers of young people to devote themselves to social causes all over the world."

In January 2008, Houston, Texas declared 14 January as "Muhammad Yunus Day".

Yunus was named among the most desired thinkers the world should listen to by the FP 100 (world's most influential elite) in the December 2009 issue of Foreign Policy magazine. In 2010, the British magazine New Statesman listed Yunus at 40th in the list of "The World's 50 Most Influential Figures 2010".

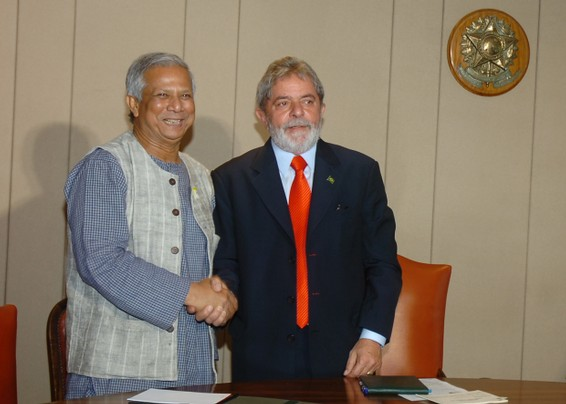
Yunus with Brazilian President Lula Da Silva (right) in 2008 after winning Nobel Peace Prize

Yunus has delivered numerous lectures around the world, and has appeared on popular television shows, including The Daily Show with Jon Stewart and The Oprah Winfrey Show in 2006, The Colbert Report in 2008, Real Time with Bill Maher in 2009 and The Simpsons in 2010. On Google+, Yunus was one of the most followed people worldwide, with over two million followers until Google closed its operations in 2019.

He has played a key advisory role in the Paris 2024 Olympics, promoting social business principles and encouraging sustainable, socially responsible projects. His influence led to initiatives like prioritizing social businesses in public tenders and integrating social housing into the athletes' village redevelopment.

In 2025, the University of Chittagong awarded him an honorary Doctor of Literature (D.Litt.) degree.

On 15 October 2026, Muhammad Yunus received the Hillary Rodham Clinton Award from Hillary Clinton and Georgetown University's Institute for Women, Peace and Security.

== Arson attack on ancestral home ==
On the night of 18 November 2026, a fire broke out at the ancestral home of Muhammad Yunus in the Panchlaish area of Chattogram, Bangladesh. The fire started in an abandoned room on the ground floor of the building. Police personnel at the scene brought it under control. Families of two of Yunus's brothers lived on the upper floors of the house.

Police suspected that activists of the banned Awami League were involved in the attack. Chattogram Metropolitan Police Commissioner Hasan Mohammad Shawkat Ali said that preliminary findings pointed to the involvement of members of a banned political group. Police also recovered a bottle containing a flammable substance from the scene. The identities of those responsible had not been confirmed at the time.

On 19 November, a case was filed at Panchlaish Police Station against unidentified individuals. Investigators collected CCTV footage and began efforts to identify those involved.

== Works ==
Publications

- Yunus, Muhammad (1974). Three Farmers of Jobra. Department of Economics, Chittagong University.
- —— (1976). "Muhammad Yunus". Encyclopedia of Corporate Social Responsibility. Chittagong University. pp. 1728–1730. doi:10.1007/978-3-642-28036-8_715. ISBN 978-3-642-28035-1.
- ——; Isalama, Saiyada Manajurula; Rahman, Arifa (1991). Jorimon and Others: Faces of Poverty. Grameen Bank.
- —— (1994). Grameen Bank, as I See it. Grameen Bank.
- —— (1999). Banker to the Poor: Micro-Lending and the Battle Against World Poverty. New York: PublicAffairs. ISBN 978-1-58648-198-8.
- —— (2007). Creating a World without Poverty: Social Business and the Future of Capitalism. New York: PublicAffairs. ISBN 978-1-58648-493-4.
- —— (2010). Building Social Business: The New Kind of Capitalism that Serves Humanity's Most Pressing Needs. New York: Public Affairs. ISBN 978-1-58648-824-6.
- Yunus, Muhammad; Moingeon, Bertrand; Lehmann-Ortega, Laurence (April 2010). "Building Social Business Models: Lessons from the Grameen Experience". Long Range Planning. 43 (2–3): 308–325. doi:10.1016/j.lrp.2009.12.005.
- —— (2017). A World of Three Zeroes: the new economics of zero poverty, zero unemployment, and zero carbon emissions. Scribe Publications.

Documentaries

- 2000 – Sixteen Decisions
- 2010 – To Catch a Dollar
- 2011 – Bonsai People – The Vision of Muhammad Yunus directed by Holly Mosher

== See also ==
- Yunus Centre
- Yunus Social Business
- List of chief advisers of Bangladesh
- List of Nobel Peace Prize laureates

Awards and achievements
Preceded by He Kang	World Food Prize; 1994	Succeeded by Hans R. Herren
Academic offices
Preceded by Gus Macdonald	Chancellor of Glasgow Caledonian University; 2012–2018	Succeeded by Annie Lennox
Political offices
Preceded by Sheikh Hasina as prime minister	Chief Adviser of Bangladesh; 2024–2026	Succeeded by Tarique Rahman as prime minister
