= Grameen Danone =

Grameen Danone Foods, popularly known as Grameen Danone, is a social business enterprise, launched in 2006, which has been designed to provide children with many of the key nutrients that are typically missing from their diet in rural Bangladesh. It is run on 'No loss, No dividend' basis. Initially, Grameen Danone agreed to pay an annual dividend of one percent to shareholders, however, in December 2009, the board of Grameen Danone agreed to waive any monetary return.

== History ==
During his visit to Paris, France, in 2005, Muhammad Yunus, the founder of Grameen Bank was invited by Franck Riboud, the chief executive officer of Groupe Danone (known as Dannon in the US). On 12 October 2005, they met in La Fontaine Gaillon, a Parisian restaurant. There Yunus proposed to form a joint venture between Grameen and Danone with the objective of supplying nutritious food to poor children of Bangladesh. As proposed by Muhammad Yunus, Franck Riboud agreed to participate in the project to be styled a social business. Accordingly, the Grameen Group and Groupe Danone entered into an agreement to form a company called Grameen Danone Foods – a social business in Bangladesh. The objective was to bring daily healthy nutrition to low income nutritionally deprived populations in Bangladesh and alleviate poverty through the implementation of a community based business model, where no profit will be appropriated by the investing partners.

The launch of Grameen Danone received considerable attention and was attended by celebrities including French soccer player Zinedine Zidane of France.

Grameen Danone was led by Corinne Bazina from 2010 to 2014, Eric Ipavec from 2014 to 2016, Valérie Mazon from 2017 to 2018, and Dipesh Nag since 2020.

== Products and price ==
Grameen Danone Foods Ltd. produces a yoghurt called Shokti Doi containing protein, vitamins, iron, calcium, zinc and other micronutrients aimed to fill nutritional deficits of children in Bangladesh. 'Shokti Doi' (which means 'strength yoghurt') is primarily intended for children. In 2017, a 50g cup sold for 10 Taka and 80g cup for 40 taka.

== Objective ==
Grameen Danone Foods aims to reduce poverty by creating business and employment opportunities for local people since raw materials including milk needed for production, will be sourced locally. The companies that make up Grameen Danone Foods Ltd. have agreed not to take out any of the profits out of the company. Instead they will invest these for creation of new opportunities for the welfare and development of people. Hence it is called 'social business enterprise'.

== Production capacity ==
Grameen Danone has planned to set up and launch as many as 50 production plants during the ten years between 2006 and 2016. The first factory has been built in Bogra district which is about 230 kilometres (140 mi) north of Dhaka, the capital city of Bangladesh. The first factory is a small one built upon an area of 7,000 sq ft (650 m^{2}). Its daily production capacity was 3,000 kilograms (6,600 lb) of yogurt when launched in 2006. In 2008, the production capacity has been planned to be enhanced to 10,000 kilograms (22,000 lb) and beyond. Several hundred livestock-farming and distribution jobs would be created in the local community as a result of establishment of the first factory. As of 2011, the company had not opened another factory.

== Challenges ==
Grameen Danone maintains strict quality control for Shokti Doi. The cold chain is maintained all the way from production to the end consumers. But maintaining cold chain is very expensive in Bangladesh as the traffic gridlock is a common scenario. Costly transportation is eating up a big portion of the return, thus could not reach its break-even till date.
