= Social business =

Self-sustaining non-profit business

Social business was defined by Nobel Peace Prize laureate Professor Muhammad Yunus and is described in his books.

In these books, Yunus defined a social business as a business:

- Created and designed to address a social problem
- A non-loss, non-dividend company, i.e.
1. It is financially self-sustainable and
2. Profits realized by the business are reinvested in the business itself (or used to start other social businesses), with the aim of increasing social impact, for example expanding the company's reach, improving the products or services or in other ways subsidizing the social mission.

Unlike a profit-maximizing business, the prime aim of a social business is not to maximize profits (although generating profits is desired). Furthermore, business owners are not receiving any dividend out of the business profits, if any.

On the other hand, unlike a non-profit, a social business is not dependent on donations or on private or public grants to survive and to operate, because, as any other business, it is self-sustainable. Furthermore, unlike a non-profit, where funds are spent only once on the field, funds in a social business are invested to increase and improve the business's operations on the field on an indefinite basis. Per Yunus: "A charity dollar has only one life; a social business dollar can be invested over and over again."

Philosophically, social business is based on what Yunus identifies as the two basic motives of human beings, selfishness and selflessness. Selfishly, people do seek profit through business; however, social business is also based on the latter motive people by performing philanthropic services, like establishing churches, mosques, synagogues, art museums, public parks, health clinics or community centers. For Yunus, the profits made through a social business's operations are less important than the beneficial effects it has on society. Muhammad Yunus has more recently founded Yunus Social Business (YSB) to study, support, and invest in young social businesses.

More recently a wider body of academic research has looked at how the blockchain and specifically smart contracts can support the development of the social business concept. Researchers are of the view that the Blockchain alongside smart contracts can act as a catalyst for sustainable social business.

== Examples ==
Grameen bank was founded in 1976 by Muhammad Yunus using a social business model. It has given loans to millions of people, a large percentage of which are women, to help them come out of poverty. Yunus draws five lessons for building social businesses from this experiment: challenging conventional wisdom, finding complementary partners, undertaking continuous experimentation, favoring social profit-oriented shareholders, and specifying social profit objectives clearly.

Born in a conversation between Yunus and Franck Ribbed, the founder of Groupe Danone, Grameen Danone in Bangladesh was, according to Yunus, the world's first consciously initiated social business. It produced a kind of yogurt called Shokti Doi, which was enriched with nutrients and intended to feed children in need. Efforts were made to make the business self-sustainable, including recruiting Grameen ladies to serve as local salespeople. The goal of the business was to create a successful yogurt factory, and expand to as many as fifty factories, to demonstrate that the concept of a social business worked.

== Principles ==
Seven principles of a successful social business were developed by Muhammad Yunus and Hans Reitz, the co-founder of Grameen Creative Lab:

1. Business objective will be to overcome poverty, or one or more problems (such as education, health, technology access, and environment) which threaten people and society; not profit maximization.
2. Financial and economic sustainability
3. Investors get back their investment amount only. No dividend is given beyond investment money
4. When investment amount is paid back, company profit stays with the company for expansion and improvement
5. Gender sensitive and environmentally conscious
6. Workforce gets market wage with better working conditions
7. ...Do it with joy

== See also ==
- Impact Investing
- Social entrepreneur
- Social entrepreneurship
- Social enterprise
- Double bottom line
- Triple bottom line
- List of social enterprises
- Sustainopreneurship
- Base of the pyramid

== Note ==
- Jäger, Urs (2010). Managing Social Businesses. Mission, Governance, Strategy and Accountability. Palgrave Macmillan. pp. 256. ISBN 978-0-230-25254-7.
- Yunus Muhammad, Moingeon Bertrand, Laurence Lehmann-Ortega (2010), "Building Social Business Models: Lessons from the Grameen Experience", April-June, vol 43, n° 2-3, Long Range Planning, p. 308-325"
- Wimmer, Nancy (2012). Green Energy for a Billion Poor: How Grameen Shakti Created a Winning Model for Social Business. MCRE Verlag. p. 226. ISBN 978-3-943310-00-9.
- Agafonow, Alejandro and Cam, Donaldson (2015), "The Economic Rationale Behind the Social Business Model: A Research Agenda," Vol 5, No 1, Social Business, pp. 5-16.
