= List of credit unions in the United States =

This is a partial list of credit unions in the United States.

A credit union is a member-owned financial cooperative, democratically controlled by its members, and operated for the purpose of promoting thrift, providing credit at competitive rates, and providing other financial services to its members. Credit unions in the United States may either be chartered by the federal government or a state government. The National Credit Union Administration is the U.S. independent federal agency that supervises and charters federal credit unions. As of December 31, 2022, there were 4,760 federally insured credit unions in the United States with 135.3 million members.

== Credit union leagues and associations ==
- American Consumer Council
- Association of Vermont Credit Unions
- California and Nevada Credit Union Leagues
- Cornerstone Credit Union League
- Ohio Credit Union League

== Credit unions ==
Credit unions, the location of their headquarters, and their field of membership.
Name	Headquarters	Type	Charter Number	Charter Year	Status	Field of Membership
1st Nor Cal	Martinez, California	FISCU	68668	1949	Active	Any and all persons who live, regularly work, currently attend school, or currently worship in Contra Costa, Solano, or Alameda counties, as well as any and all businesses, corporations, and other legal entities in those counties.
1166	Swedesboro, New Jersey	FCU	1166	1936	Active	
1199 SEIU	New York, New York	FCU	24670	1940	Active	Must be an active 1199 SEIU Healthcare Workers East member.
167th TFR	Martinsburg, West Virginia	FCU	13028	1959	Active	Must be an active 1199 SEIU Healthcare Workers East member.
3 - C	Kansas	FISCU	61871	1955	Inactive	
501 Electrical Workers	New York	FCU	23082	1978	Inactive	
802	Barre, Vermont	FISCU	62983	1953	Active	Live, work, or worship in Vermont or in Grafton, Sullivan, or Cheshire County in New Hampshire – or be related to a current member of 802CU.
New England	Williston, Vermont	FCU	19263	1969	Active	Employees of the State of Vermont, the Vermont State Employees' Association, the Vermont State Colleges, the Vermont Foodbank, the Vermont Community Loan Fund, the Green Mountain United Way, IBM and working in ME, MA, RI, VT, or Hartford or Litchfield counties in CT, UVM Health Network and work or are paid from Burlington, VT. Members of the Vermont General Assembly, the Northeast Sustainable Energy Association, the Washington Electric Cooperative, the American Consumer Council, or the Financial Fitness Association. NEFCU will provide a complimentary one-year membership to the American Consumer Council for anyone wishing to join the Credit Union.

=== 0-9 ===
- 1st Liberty Federal Credit Union
- 1st Tenants
- 1st United Credit Union
- 1st Valley Credit Union
- 717 Credit Union

=== A–M ===
- A+ Federal Credit Union
- ACT 1st Federal Credit Union
- Affinity Federal Credit Union
- Affinity Plus Federal Credit Union
- AFL–CIO Employees Federal Credit Union
- Aggieland Credit Union
- LUND Federal Credit Union
- Alliant Credit Union
- Altana Federal Credit Union
- Altura Credit Union
- American Airlines Federal Credit Union
- America First Credit Union
- America's First Federal Credit Union
- AmeriCU Credit Union
- Andrews Federal Credit Union
- Ancorum Credit Union
- Apple Federal Credit Union
- Ardent Credit Union, Pennsylvania
- Arrowhead Credit Union
- Arkansas Federal Credit Union
- Arsenal Credit Union (National Geospatial-Intelligence Agency)
- Ascend Federal Credit Union
- Associated Credit Union
- Atlanta Postal Credit Union
- Avadian Credit Union
- Badlands Federal Credit Union
- BECU
- Beehive Federal Credit Union
- Belvoir Federal Credit Union
- Bethpage Federal Credit Union
- Beulah Federal Credit Union
- Billings Federal Credit Union
- Bitterroot Community Federal Credit Union
- Blue Eagle Credit Union
- Boulder Dam Credit Union
- BP Federal Credit Union
- Broadview Federal Credit Union
- Buckeye State Credit Union
- Butte Community Federal Credit Union
- Cascade Community Federal Credit Union
- California Credit Union
- Call Federal Credit Union
- Caltech Employees Federal Credit Union
- Chartway Federal Credit Union
- Christian Community Credit Union
- Citizens Equity First Credit Union
- Clearview Federal Credit Union
- Clearwater Credit Union
- Coastal Federal Credit Union
- Commonwealth Credit Union
- CommunityAmerica Credit Union
- Community First Credit Union, Florida
- Community First Credit Union, Wisconsin
- Community 1st Federal Credit Union, Montana
- Connections Credit Union
- Consumers Credit Union
- CoVantage Credit Union
- Credit Human Credit Union
- Credit Union 1 (Alaska)
- Dakotaland Federal Credit Union
- Del-One
- Del Norte Credit Union
- Delta Community Credit Union
- Denali Alaskan Federal Credit Union
- Desert Financial Credit Union
- DFCU Financial
- Digital Federal Credit Union
- DuTrac Community Credit Union
- Eastman Credit Union
- Ent Credit Union
- Envision Credit Union
- ESL Federal Credit Union
- First Citizens' Federal Credit Union
- First Entertainment Credit Union
- First New York Federal Credit Union
- First Tech Federal Credit Union
- Florida State University Credit Union
- Fox Communities Credit Union, Wisconsin
- Fox Federal Credit Union
- Fort Liberty Federal Credit Union
- Frontier Credit Union
- Genisys Credit Union
- Georgetown University Alumni and Student Federal Credit Union
- Georgia's Own Credit Union
- Global Credit Union (formerly Alaska USA Federal Credit Union)
- Golden 1 Credit Union
- Goldenwest Credit Union
- Government Employees Credit Union (El Paso), Texas
- Great Wisconsin Credit Union
- Greater Texas Credit Union
- Hawaii Community Federal Credit Union
- Hawaii State Federal Credit Union
- Holyoke Credit Union
- Hudson Valley Credit Union
- IBM Southeast Employees' Federal Credit Union
- Idaho Central Credit Union
- Insight Credit Union
- iQ Credit Union
- Keesler Federal Credit Union
- KeyPoint Federal Credit Union
- Kinecta Federal Credit Union
- Knoxville TVA Employees Credit Union
- Lafayette Federal Credit Union
- Lake Michigan Credit Union
- Lake Trust Credit Union
- Landmark Credit Union
- Langley Federal Credit Union
- Logix Federal Credit Union
- Lookout Credit Union
- Lower East Side People's Federal Credit Union
- Marine Credit Union
- Melrose Credit Union (Closed)
- Member One Federal Credit Union
- Members Preferred Credit Union
- Merck Sharp & Dohme Federal Credit Union
- Metro Credit Union
- Michigan Schools and Government Credit Union
- Michigan State University Federal Credit Union
- MidFlorida Credit Union
- Mission Federal Credit Union
- Meriwest Credit Union
- Motion Federal Credit Union
- Mountain America Credit Union
- Municipal Credit Union

=== N–Z ===
- NASA Federal Credit Union
- NavyArmy Community Credit Union, Texas
- Navy Federal Credit Union
- Neighborhood Trust Federal Credit Union, Washington Heights, New York City
- Nevada Federal Credit Union
- New England Federal Credit Union
  - Direct Financial
  - Vermont State Employees' Credit Union
- New Mexico Educators Federal Credit Union
- Northwest Federal Credit Union
- Notre Dame Federal Credit Union
- Numerica Credit Union
- Nusenda Credit Union
- Oakland University Credit Union
- Oak Ridge National Laboratory Federal Credit Union
- OBEE Credit Union
- Ocean Financial Federal Credit Union
- Ohio University Credit Union (OUCU Financial)
- OnPoint Community Credit Union
- Orlando Credit Union
- Pacific Marine Credit Union, California
- Partners Federal Credit Union, California
- Patelco Credit Union, California
- Pentagon Federal Credit Union
- PeoplesChoice Credit Union
- Penn State Federal Credit Union
- Philadelphia Federal Credit Union, Pennsylvania
- Picatinny Federal Credit Union
- Polish & Slavic Federal Credit Union
- Purdue Federal Credit Union
- PrimeWay Federal Credit Union
- Progressive Credit Union
- Premier America
- Premier Members Credit Union
- PSECU, Pennsylvania
- Randolph-Brooks Federal Credit Union, Texas
- Red Canoe Credit Union
- Redstone Federal Credit Union
- Redwood Credit Union
- Credit Union of Richmond
- Robins Financial Credit Union
- Rogue Credit Union
- Royal Credit Union, Wisconsin and Minnesota
- San Francisco Lee Federal Credit Union
- San Francisco Fire Credit Union
- San Francisco Federal Credit Union
- San Joaquin Power Employees Credit Union
- SchoolsFirst Federal Credit Union
- Scott Credit Union
- Seattle Credit Union
- Security Service Federal Credit Union, Texas, Colorado, and Utah
- Service Credit Union
- SkyOne Federal Credit Union
- South Carolina Federal Credit Union
- Southeastern Federal Credit Union
- Southland Credit Union
- Spero Financial Federal Credit Union
- Spire Credit Union
- Spokane Teachers Credit Union
- SRP Federal Credit Union
- Stanford Federal Credit Union
- Star One Credit Union
- State Department Federal Credit Union
- State Employees Credit Union of North Carolina
- Suffolk Credit Union
- Summit Credit Union
- Sunbelt Federal Credit Union
- Suncoast Schools Federal Credit Union
- Sunmark Credit Union
- Superior Credit Union
- Teachers Federal Credit Union
- Technicolor Federal Credit Union
- Texas Dow Employees Credit Union
- Tinker Federal Credit Union
- Town & Country Federal Credit Union
- Treasury Department Federal Credit Union
- Triangle Credit Union
- Tropical Financial Credit Union
- Truliant Federal Credit Union
- TruChoice Federal Credit Union
- TruMark Financial Credit Union
- TruWest Credit Union
- TULIP Cooperative Credit Union
- Tyco Federal Credit Union
- U of I Community Credit Union, Illinois
- UMassFive College Federal Credit Union
- UMe Federal Credit Union, California
- The Union Credit Union
- United Federal Credit Union
- United Heritage Credit Union
- United Nations Federal Credit Union
- University Credit Union
- University Federal Credit Union (UFCU)
- University of Kentucky Federal Credit Union
- University of Michigan Credit Union
- University of Tennessee Federal Credit Union
- University of Wisconsin Credit Union
- U.S. Central Credit Union (Defunct)
- U.S. Eagle Federal Credit Union
- USA Federal Credit Union
- USALLIANCE Financial Federal Credit Union
- USU Charter Credit Union
- Veridian Credit Union
- Verity Credit Union
- Vermont Federal Credit Union
- Visions Federal Credit Union
- VyStar Credit Union
- Washington State Employees Credit Union
- Webster First Federal Credit Union, Massachusetts
- Wescom Financial
- Westmark Credit Union
- Western Bridge Corporate Federal Credit Union (Defunct)
- WESTconsin Credit Union, Wisconsin
- Wings Financial Credit Union
- Wright-Patt Credit Union

== See also ==
- Banking in the United States
- History of credit unions
