= UMCU =

UMCU may refer to:

- University Medical Center Utrecht, hospital in Utrecht, Netherlands
- University of Michigan Credit Union, a credit union in the United States
