= Global Credit Union Arena =

Entertainment facility in Arizona, United States

Global Credit Union Arena at Grand Canyon University
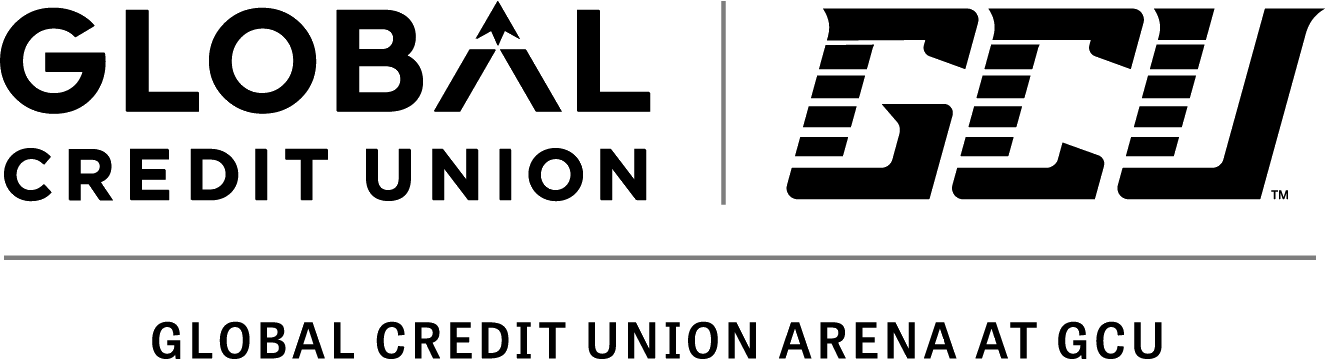

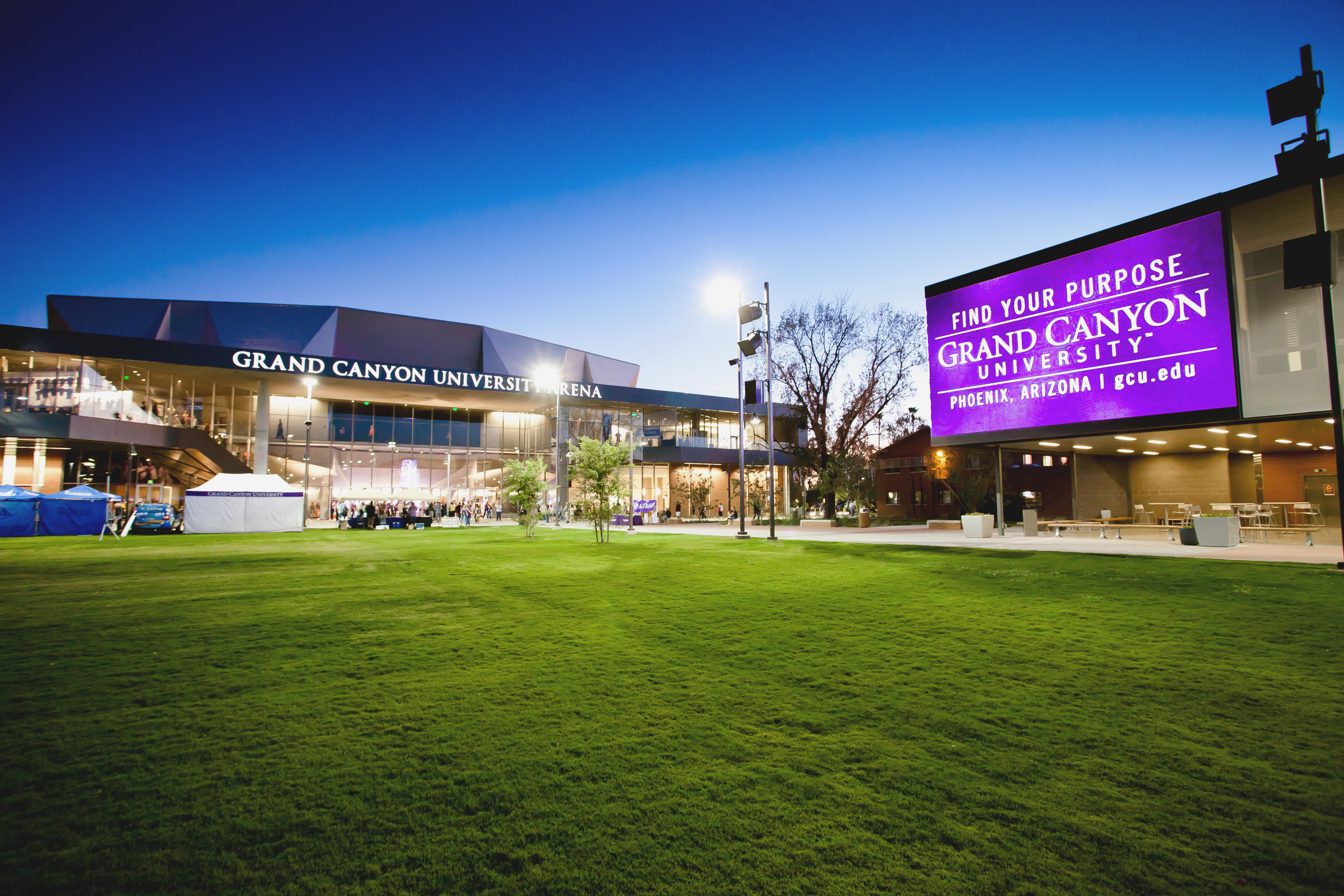
- Global Credit Union Arena at dusk.
- Interactive map of Global Credit Union Arena at Grand Canyon University
- Location: 3300 West Camelback Road; Phoenix, Arizona 85017
- Coordinates: 33°30′37″N 112°07′44″W
- Owner: Grand Canyon University
- Operator: GCU Athletics
- Capacity: 7,000

Construction
- Groundbreaking: June 25, 2010
- Opened: September 1, 2011; 14 years ago
- Architects: 360 Architecture; Architekton
- Structural engineer: Paragon Structural Design
- Services engineer: Henderson Engineers
- General contractor: Perini Building Company

Tenants
- Grand Canyon Antelopes men's & women's basketball

Website
- gcuarena.com

Global Credit Union Arena at Grand Canyon University (originally named GCU Arena) is a 7,000-seat, 135,000-square-foot (12,500 m^{2}) multi-purpose entertainment and athletics facility in Phoenix, Arizona, owned and operated by Grand Canyon University. The arena is the home of Grand Canyon University Lopes men's and women's basketball teams, men's and women's volleyball teams and other university events.

== History ==
GCU Arena officially opened its doors on September 2, 2011, just 15 months after the university announced the project. The construction of the arena was part of the university's $200 million campus expansion and growth. It regularly hosts Christian and secular concerts, outside performances, speaking engagements, Grand Canyon University athletic events, and commencement ceremonies.

In addition to the arena, the university is in the process of upgrading the athletics facilities, building new classroom space, dormitories, and other educational facilities on campus.

On December 5, 2023, GCU announced a naming-rights partnership with Global Credit Union to rename the arena Global Credit Union Arena. That same night, GCU's men's basketball team defeated No. 25 San Diego State for the program's first top-25 win.

== Sports teams and other events ==
Global Credit Union Arena is home to Grand Canyon University's Lopes men's and women's basketball and men's and women's volleyball.

GCU plays host to Christian and secular concerts, outside performances, speaking engagements, athletic events, and commencement ceremonies. Previous acts include: The Beach Boys, Casting Crowns, David Crowder Band, M-1 Global Challenge, Switchfoot, Pandora's Unforgettable Moments on Ice featuring David Archuleta and Mannheim Steamroller, Lady Antebellum, and Third Day. In 2017 it hosted the ESPN/Intersport-produced College Slam Dunk & 3-Point Championship leading up to that year's Final Four at Glendale's University of Phoenix Stadium.

On October 14, 2012, the arena hosted TNA Wrestling's 8th annual premier pay-per-view of the year, Bound for Glory.

== Facility information ==
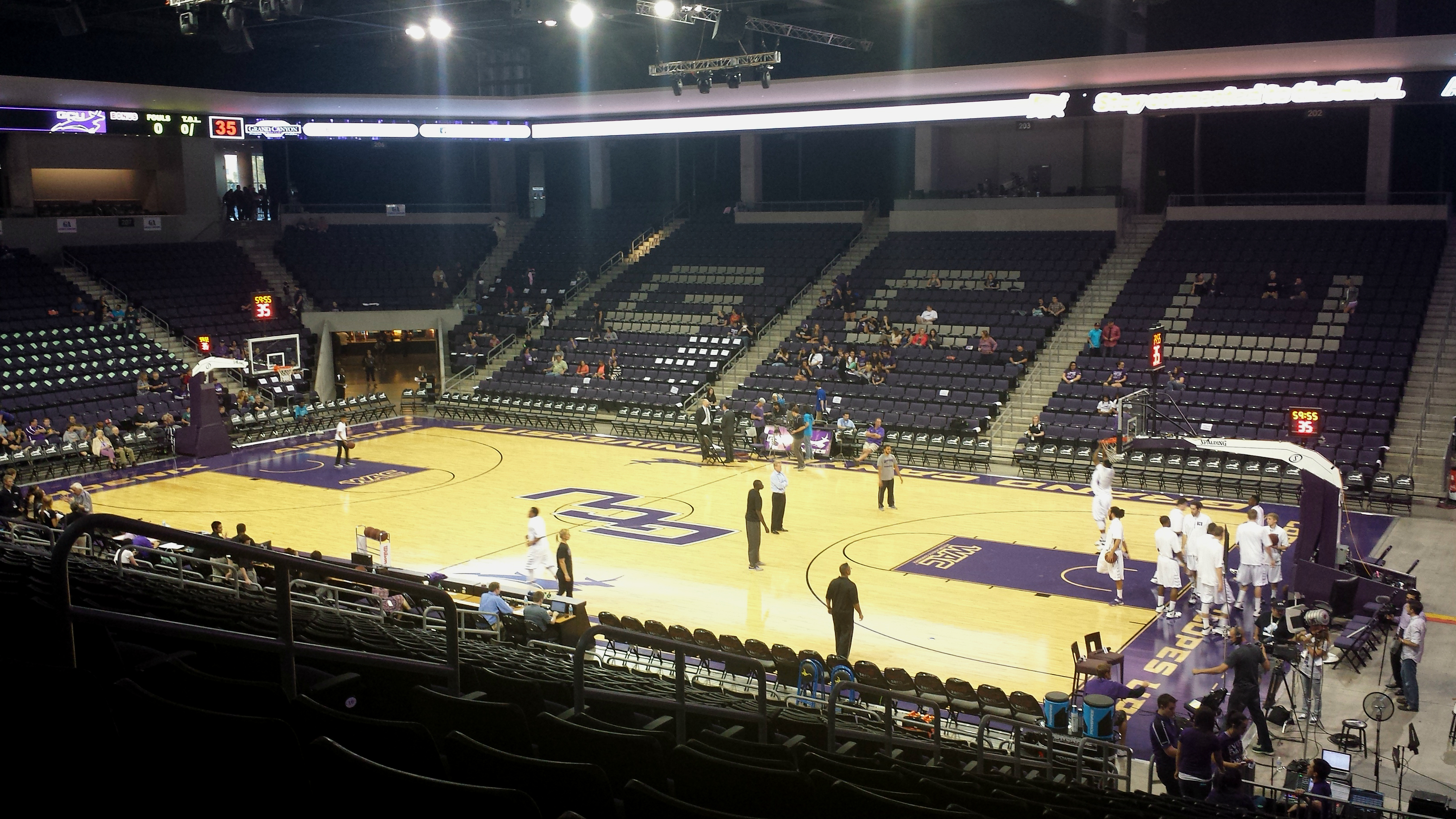
Inside of Grand Canyon University Arena, one hour prior to a men's basketball game.

There are 7,000 seats in the 135,000-square-foot (12,500 m^{2}) arena. There are also five concession stands (including three pizza ovens), 17 restrooms, four locker rooms, two escalators, two elevators, two grand staircases and a total of four HD video boards and one high resolution digital ribbon board. The state-of-the-art video boards were installed by Atlanta-based Innovation Sports Marketing. The main video board measures 15 feet (4.6 m) tall by 35 feet (11 m) wide and weighs around three tons.

Design for the facility was done by 360 Architecture and Tempe-based Architekton. When construction of the arena was complete there were a total of 255,000 man hours, 8,870 yards of concrete, 41,000 bricks, 793 tons of structural steel, 75 miles (121 km) of electrical wiring, and 2,300 light fixtures.

Notable features include large windows providing natural light, ceiling beams signed by GCU employees and students, a vault of Bibles buried at center court and an outdoor balcony with views of the Camelback Road campus. There are only 42 steps from event level to concourse level to ensure that every seat in the arena is a good one.

== Expansion ==
Just over three years after opening, GCU Arena closed on March 3, 2014, to undergo a massive remodel. With the quicker-than-anticipated jump to Division I athletics for the Grand Canyon Antelopes athletic programs, the school announced the expansion of the arena from a capacity of 5,000 to 7,000 seats. The growth of the arena was primarily intended to incorporate adequate seating for the men's basketball games and for larger concerts.

Arizona sports icon Jerry Colangelo, who is closely connected with the athletic program, was involved in the expansion process, stating: "If GCU knew when the building went up just a couple of years ago that they would be in Division I as quickly as we have, it would have been built bigger."

After a proposed finish date of October 17, the Arena opened nearly six weeks ahead of schedule on August 23 for a Switchfoot concert as a part of the school's 2014 Welcome Weekend. Final changes included an upper-deck seating area, a movable track for the high definition video display, and a new basketball floor.

== See also ==
- List of NCAA Division I basketball arenas
