= CEFCU =

CEFCU may refer to:

- Caltech Employees Federal Credit Union (1950), La Cañada Flintridge, California
- Citizens Equity First Credit Union (1937), Peoria, Illinois — also operates in California; formerly Caterpillar Employees' Credit Union (CECU), then Construction Equipment Federal Credit Union (CEFCU)
- CEFCU Stadium, sports venue on the campus of San Jose State University in California
