= SCU =

SCU may refer to:

== Education ==
=== Asia ===
- Sapporo City University, Sapporo, Japan
- Shih Chien University, Taipei, Taiwan
- Sichuan University, Chengdu, Sichuan, China
- Seoul Cyber University, Seoul, South Korea
- Soochow University (disambiguation)
- Shahid Chamran University, Ahvaz, Khuzestan, Iran
- Soegijapranata Catholic University, Semarang, Central Java, Indonesia

=== United States ===
- Santa Clara University, Santa Clara, California, USA
- Southern California University of Health Sciences, Whittier, California, USA
- Southwestern Christian University, Bethany, Oklahoma, USA

=== Others ===
- Scott Christian University, Machakos, Kenya
- Southern Cross University, Lismore, New South Wales, Australia
- Suez Canal University, Ismailia, Egypt

== Technology ==
- SAS control unit, a hardware component that controls Serial attached SCSI devices
- Single compilation unit, C/C++ specific compilation technique
- System Control Unit for Sega Saturn chip set

== Unions ==
- Scottish Cyclist's Union, the sports governing body for cycling in Scotland, now known as Scottish Cycling
- Service Credit Union, New Hampshire
- Steinbach Credit Union, Canada

== Units ==
- Serious Crash Unit, a New Zealand television series
- Scoville Units on the Scoville scale measure the hotness or piquancy of sauces
- Special Commando Unit, employed by the MACV-SOG during the Vietnam War
- Street Crimes Unit, part of the New York Police Department
- Santa Clara Unit, an operational unit of the California Department of Forestry and Fire Protection responsible for the East and South Bay regions of the Bay Area.

== Other uses ==
- Antonio Maceo Airport in Santiago de Cuba, Cuba (IATA airport code: SCU)
- SoCal Uncensored, a professional wrestling stable often referred to as SCU
- Sacra Corona Unita, a Mafia-like criminal organization from Apulia, southern Italy
- SCU Lightning Complex fires, a group of wildfires in California
- Sculptor Capital Management, an American alternative asset management firm (stock symbol SCU)
- Senatus consultum ultimum, something tantamount to martial law in the times of the Roman Republic
- Service Class User, a term used in the DICOM standard
- Sacra Corona Unita, an Italian criminal organization
