= Statewide opinion polling for the March 2008 Democratic Party presidential primaries =

This article is a collection of statewide public opinion polls that have been conducted relating to the March Democratic presidential primaries, 2008.

== Polling ==
=== Mississippi ===
Mississippi winner: Barack Obama
Format: Primary see: Mississippi Democratic primary, 2008
Date: 11 March 2008
Delegates At Stake 33
Delegates Won To be determined

Poll source	Date	Highlights
American Research Group Sample Size: 600 LV; Margin of Error: ± 4%	March 9–10, 2008	Obama 54%, Clinton 38%, Other 4%, Undecided 4%
InsiderAdvantage/Majority Opinion Sample Size: 338; Margin of Error: ± 6%	March 9, 2008	Obama 54%, Clinton 37%, Undecided 9%
InsiderAdvantage Sample Size: 412; Margin of Error: ± 5%	March 6, 2008	Obama 46%, Clinton 40%, Undecided 14%
American Research Group Sample Size: 600 LV; Margin of Error: ± 4%	March 5–6, 2008	Obama 58%, Clinton 34%, Other 5%, Undecided 3%
Rasmussen Reports Sample Size: 816 LV; Margin of Error: ± 4%	March 5, 2008	Obama 53%, Clinton 39%, Undecided 8%

=== Ohio ===
Ohio winner: Hillary Clinton
Format: Primary see: Ohio Democratic primary, 2008
Date: March 4, 2008
Delegates At Stake 141
Delegates Won To be determined

Poll source	Date	Highlights
American Research Group Sample Size: 600; Margin of Error: ±4%	March 2–3, 2008	Clinton 56%, Obama 42%, Someone else 1%, Undecided 1%
Zogby Sample Size: 828; Margin of Error: ±3.4%	March 1–3, 2008	Obama 44%, Clinton 44%, Gravel 1%, Someone else 3%, Not sure 8%
Rasmussen Reports Sample Size: 858; Margin of Error: ±3%	March 2, 2008	Clinton 50%, Obama 44%, Undecided 6%
Survey USA Sample Size: 873; Margin of Error: ±3.4%	March 1–2, 2008	Clinton 54%, Obama 44%, Other 1%, Undecided 1%
Public Policy Polling Sample Size: 1112; Margin of Error: ±2.9%	March 1–2, 2008	Clinton 51%, Obama 42%, Undecided 7%
Suffolk University Sample Size: 400	March 1–2, 2008	Clinton 52%, Obama 40%, Undecided 8%
Zogby Sample Size: 761; Margin of Error: ±3.6%	February 29 – March 2, 2008	Obama 47%, Clinton 45%, Gravel 1%, Someone else 2%, Not sure 6%
University of Cincinnati Sample Size: 624; Margin of Error: ±3.9%	February 28 – March 2, 2008	Clinton 51.3%, Obama 42.3%, Edwards 6.0%, Other 0.4%
Quinnipiac University Sample Size: 799; Margin of Error: ±3.5%	February 27 – March 2, 2008	Clinton 49%, Obama 45%, Undecided 6%
American Research Group Sample Size: 600; Margin of Error: ±4%	February 29 – March 1, 2008	Clinton 51%, Obama 44%, Other 1%, Undecided 4%
Zogby Sample Size: 746; Margin of Error: ± 3.7%	February 28 – March 1, 2008	Clinton 47%, Obama 46%, Gravel 1%, Someone Else 1%, Not Sure 5%
Mason-Dixon Sample Size: 625; Margin of Error: ± 4%	February 27–29, 2008	Clinton 47%, Obama 43%
Zogby Sample Size: 701; Margin of Error: ± 3.8%	February 27–29, 2008	Obama 45%, Clinton 45%, Gravel 1%, Someone Else 3%, Not Sure 6%
Columbus Dispatch Sample Size: 2,308; Margin of Error:	February 21–29, 2008	Clinton 56%, Obama 40%
Rasmussen Reports Sample Size: 851; Margin of Error: ± 3.8%	February 28, 2008	Clinton 47%, Obama 45%, Undecided 9%
American Research Group Sample Size: 600; Margin of Error: ±4%	February 27–28, 2008	Clinton 50%, Obama 45%, Other 2%, Undecided 3%
Zogby Sample Size: 708; Margin of Error: ± 3%	February 26–28, 2008	Clinton 44%, Obama 42%, Gravel 1%, Someone Else 5%, Not Sure 9%
Rasmussen Reports Sample Size: 862; Margin of Error: ± 3.8%	February 26–28, 2008	Clinton 48%, Obama 43%, Undecided 9%
SurveyUSA Sample Size: 790; Margin of Error: ±3.6%	February 23–25, 2008	Clinton 50%, Obama 44%, Other 3%, Undecided 3%
Public Policy Polling Sample Size: 600; Margin of Error: ±4%	February 23–24, 2008	Clinton 50%, Obama 46%, Undecided 4%
American Research Group Sample Size: 600; Margin of Error: ±4%	February 23–24, 2008	Clinton 49%, Obama 39%, Other 4%, Undecided 8%
Institute of Policy Research at the University of Cincinnati Sample Size: 529; Margin of Error: ±4.3%	February 21–24, 2008	Clinton 47%, Obama 39%, Edwards 9%, Other 2%, Undecided 4%
Quinnipiac University Sample Size: 741; Margin of Error: ±3.6%	February 18–23, 2008	Clinton 51%, Obama 40%, Other 1%, Undecided 9%
Decision Analyst Sample Size: 735; Margin of Error: ± 3%	February 21–22, 2008	Obama 54%, Clinton 46%
Rasmussen Reports Sample Size: 902; Margin of Error: ± 3%	February 21, 2008	Clinton 48%, Obama 40%, Undecided 12%
Washington Post-ABC News Sample Size: 611; Margin of Error: ± 4%	February 16–20, 2008	Clinton 50%, Obama 43%, No Opinion 6%, None of These 1%, Other 1%
SurveyUSA Sample Size: 733 LV; Margin of Error: ±3.7%	February 17–18, 2008	Clinton 52%, Obama 43%, Other 4%, Undecided 1%
Rasmussen Reports Sample Size: 754 LV; Margin of Error: ±4%	February 13, 2008	Clinton 51%, Obama 37%, Undecided 12%
Quinnipiac University Sample Size: 564; Margin of Error: ±4.1%	February 6–12, 2008	Clinton 55%, Obama 34%, Other 2%, Undecided 9%
SurveyUSA Sample Size: 720; Margin of Error: ±3.7%	February 10–11, 2008	Clinton 56%, Obama 39%, Other 3%, Undecided 2%
Columbus Dispatch Sample Size: 2,156; Margin of Error: ±2%	January 23–31, 2008	Clinton 42%, Obama 19%, Edwards 18%, Kucinich 1%, Undecided 20%
Opinion Consultants Sample Size: 800		Clinton 44%, Obama 28%, Edwards 17%
Quinnipiac University Sample Size: 436; Margin of Error: ± 4.7%	November 26 – December 3, 2007	Clinton 45%, Obama 19%, Edwards 13%, Biden 3%, Kucinich 2%, Richardson 1%, Dodd 1%, Gravel -, Other -, Undecided 13%
Quinnipiac University	November 6–11, 2007	Clinton 42%, Obama 17%, Edwards 14%, Kucinich 4%, Biden 3%, Richardson 1%, Dodd -, Gravel -, Other -, Undecided 17%
Quinnipiac University	October 1–8, 2007	Clinton 47%, Obama 19%, Edwards 11%, Kucinich 2%, Biden 2%, Richardson 1%, Dodd -, Gravel -, Other -%, undecided 15%
Strategic Vision	September 14–16, 2007	Clinton 43%, Obama 23%, Edwards 11%, Richardson 8%, Biden 3%, Kucinich 2%, Dodd 1, Undecided 11%
Quinnipiac University	August 28 – September 3, 2007	Clinton 44%, Obama 15%, Edwards 11%, Gore 8%, Kucinich 3%, Biden 2%, Richardson 1%, Dodd -, Gravel -, Other 1%, undecided 13%
Quinnipiac University	July 30 – August 6, 2007	Clinton 41%, Obama 16%, Edwards 11%, Gore 8%, Biden 3%, Kucinich 2%, Richardson 1%, Dodd -, Gravel -, Other 3%, undecided 14%
Quinnipiac University	July 3–9, 2007	Clinton 35%, Obama 17%, Edwards 13%, Gore 12%, Kucinich 3%, Richardson 2%, Biden 1%, Dodd -, Gravel -, Other 2%, undecided 15%
Quinnipiac University (without Gore)	June 18–25, 2007	Clinton 46%, Edwards 15%, Obama 14%, Kucinich 3%, Biden 1%, Richardson 1%, Dodd -, Gravel -, Other 2%, undecided 17%
Quinnipiac (with Gore)	June 18–25, 2007	Clinton 40%, Edwards 12%, Gore 12%, Obama 12%, Kucinich 3%, Biden 1%, Richardson 1%, Dodd -, Gravel -, Other 2%, undecided 16%
Quinnipiac University	May 8–13, 2007	Clinton 38%, Obama 19%, Edwards 11%, Gore 10%, Kucinich 2%, Richardson 2%, Biden 1%, Clark -, Dodd -, Gravel -, Someone Else 3%, Don't Know 14%
Quinnipiac University	March 13–19, 2007	Clinton 32%, Obama 22%, Gore 14%, Edwards 11%, Kucinich 3%, Biden 1%, Richardson 1%, Clark 0%, Dodd 0%, Gravel 0%, Someone Else 2%, Wouldn't Vote 1%, Don't Know 15%
Quinnipiac University	January 23–28, 2007	Clinton 38%, Obama 13%, Edwards 11%, Gore 6%, Kerry 6%, Biden 2%, Kucinich 2%, Richardson 1%, Clark 1%, Dodd 0%, Vilsack 0%, Someone Else 1%, Wouldn't Vote 1%, Don't Know 17%

=== Rhode Island ===
Rhode Island winner: Hillary Clinton
Format: Primary see: Rhode Island Democratic primary, 2008
Date: March 4, 2008
Delegates At Stake 21
Delegates Won To be determined
See also

Poll source	Date	Highlights
Brown University Poll Sampling Size: 402; Margin of Error: ±4.88%	February 27 – March 2, 2008	Clinton 42%, Obama 37%, Undecided 22%
WPRI 12 /RIPolitics.TV Sample Size: 401; Margin of Error: ± 5%	February 24–27, 2008	Clinton 49%, Obama 40%, Not Sure 11%
Rasmussen Sample Size: 1,035; Margin of Error: ± 3.5%	February 23, 2008	Clinton 53%, Obama 38%, Undecided 9%
American Research Group Sample Size: 600; Margin of Error: ± 4%	February 20–21, 2008	Clinton 52%, Obama 40%, someone else 1%, undecided 7%
Brown University Poll Sampling Size: 474; Margin of Error: ±5%	February 9–10, 2008	Clinton 36%, Obama 28%, uncommitted 27%, undecided 9%
Brown University Poll Sampling Size: 380; Margin of Error: ±5%	September 8–9, 2007	Clinton 35%, Obama 16%, Edwards 7%, Biden 3%, Richardson 2%, Dodd 1%, Kucinich 1%, undecided 35%
Brown University Poll Sampling Size: 341; Margin of Error: ±6%	January 27, 2007	Clinton 33%, Obama 15%, Edwards 8%, Biden 4%, Dodd 2%, Richardson 1%, Vilsack 1%, undecided 36%

=== Texas ===
Texas winner: Hillary Clinton (overall popular vote; see Texas Democratic primary and caucuses, 2008 for details)
Format: Primary-Caucus Hybrid see: Texas Democratic primary and caucuses, 2008
Date: March 4, 2008
Delegates At Stake 193
Delegates Won To be determined
See also Texas Democratic Presidential Preference

Poll source	Date	Highlights
American Research Group Sample Size: 600; Margin of Error: ±4%	March 2–3, 2008	Clinton 50%, Obama 47%, Someone else 1%, Undecided 2%
Zogby Sample Size: 855; Margin of Error: ±3.4%	March 1–3, 2008	Clinton 47%, Obama 44%, Gravel 1%, Someone else 2%, Not sure 7%
Insider Advantage/Majority Opinion Sample Size: 609	March 2, 2008	Clinton 49%, Obama 44%, Not sure 7%
Rasmussen Reports Sample Size: 858; Margin of Error: ±3%	March 2, 2008	Obama 48%, Clinton 47%, Undecided 6%
SurveyUSA Sample Size: 840; Margin of Error: ±3.5%	March 1–2, 2008	Obama 49%, Clinton 48%, Other 2%, Undecided 2%
Public Policy Polling Sample Size: 755; Margin of Error: ± 3.6%	March 1–2, 2008	Clinton 50%, Obama 44%, Not sure 6%
Zogby Sample Size: 748; Margin of Error: ± 3.7%	February 29 – March 2, 2008	Obama 47%, Clinton 44%, Gravel 2%, Someone else, 1%, Not sure 6%
IVR Polls Sample Size: 1162; Margin of Error: ± 2.9%	February 28 – March 2, 2008	Clinton 49%, Obama 46%
American Research Group Sample Size: 600; Margin of Error: ± 4%	February 29 – March 1, 2008	Obama 47%, Clinton 47%, Other 2%, Undecided 4%f
Public Strategies/WFAA Dallas/BELO Corp. Sample Size: 730 LV; Margin of Error: ± 3.6%	February 28 – March 1, 2008	Obama 46%, Clinton 46%, Not sure 8%
Zogby Sample Size: 736 LV; Margin of Error: ± 3.7%	February 28 – March 1, 2008	Obama 47%, Clinton 43%, Gravel 1%, Someone Else, 2%, Not sure 7%
Mason-Dixon Sample Size: 625; Margin of Error: ± 4%	February 27–29, 2008	Obama 46%, Clinton 45%
Zogby Sample Size: 708; Margin of Error: ± 3.8%	February 27–29, 2008	Obama 45%, Clinton 43%, Gravel <1%, Someone Else 3%, Not Sure 8%
Insider Advantage Sample Size: 591	February 28, 2008	Clinton 47%, Obama 43%, Undecided 10%
American Research Group Sample Size: 600; Margin of Error: ± 4%	February 27–28, 2008	Obama 51%, Clinton 44%, Other 2%, Undecided 3%
Zogby Sample Size: 704; Margin of Error: ± 3.8%	February 26–28, 2008	Obama 48%, Clinton 42%, Gravel <1%, Someone Else 3%, Not Sure 7%
Fox News/Opinion Dynamics Sample Size: 600; Margin of Error: ± 4%	February 26–28, 2008	Obama 48%, Clinton 45%, Someone Else 2%, Not Sure 5%
Rasmussen Reports Sample Size: 503; Margin of Error: ± 4%	February 27, 2008	Obama 48%, Clinton 44%, Undecided 8%
Public Strategies/WFAA Dallas Sample Size: 735; Margin of Error: ±3.6%	February 25–27, 2008	Obama 46%, Clinton 45%, Undecided 9%
Insider Advantage/Majority Opinion Sample Size: 592	February 25, 2008	Obama 47%, Clinton 46%, Undecided 7%
KTRK/SurveyUSA Sample Size: 704; Margin of Error: ± 3.8%	February 23–25, 2008	Obama 49%, Clinton 45%, Other 3%, Undecided 3%
Rasmussen Reports Sample Size: 646; Margin of Error: ± 4%	February 24, 2008	Clinton 46%, Obama 45%, Undecided 9%
Public Policy Polling Sample Size: 434; Margin of Error: ± 4.7%	February 23–24, 2008	Clinton 48%, Obama 48%, Undecided 4%
American Research Group Sample Size: 600; Margin of Error: ± 4%	February 23–24, 2008	Obama 50%, Clinton 42%, Other 2% Undecided 6%
CNN/Opinion Research Corp. Sample Size: 861; Margin of Error: ± 3.5%	February 22–24, 2008	Obama 50%, Clinton 46%
Decision Analyst Sample Size: 678; Margin of Error: ± 3%	February 20–21, 2008	Obama 57%, Clinton 43%
Washington Post-ABC News Sample Size: 603; Margin of Error: ± 4%	February 16–20, 2008	Clinton 48%, Obama 47%, No Opinion 3%, None of These 1%, Other 1%
Rasmussen Reports Sample Size: 549; Margin of Error: ± 4%	February 20, 2008	Clinton 47%, Obama 44%, Undecided 9%
Constituent Dynamics Sample Size: 1340; Margin of Error: ± 4%	February 20, 2008	Clinton 46%, Obama 45%, Undecided 9%
IVR Polls Sample Size: 582 LV; Margin of Error: ± 4.1%	February 20, 2008	Clinton 50%, Obama 45%, Other 2%, Undecided 3%
SurveyUSA Sample Size: 660 LV; Margin of Error: ± 3.9%	February 16–18, 2008	Clinton 50%, Obama 45%, Other 3%, Undecided 2%
CNN/Opinion Research Corp. Sample Size: 529 LV; Margin of Error: ± 4.5%	February 15–17, 2008	Clinton 50%, Obama 48%, Undecided 2%
InsiderAdvantage Sample Size: 403 LV; Margin of Error: ± 5%	February 14, 2008	Clinton 48%, Obama 41%, Undecided 11%
Rasmussen Reports Sample Size: 577 LV; Margin of Error: ± 4%	February 14, 2008	Clinton 54%, Obama 38%, Undecided 9%
American Research Group Sample Size: 600 LV; Margin of Error: ± 4%	February 13–14, 2008	Obama 48%, Clinton 42%, Other 3% Undecided 7%
Texas Credit Union League Sample Size: 400; Margin of Error: ± 4.9%	February 11–13, 2008	Clinton 49%, Obama 41%, Undecided 8%
IVR Polls Sample Size: 534; Margin of Error: ± 4.3%	January 30–31, 2008	Clinton 48%, Obama 38%, Gravel 03%, Undecided 12%
IVR Polls Sample Size: 564; Margin of Error: ± 4.1%	January 10, 2008	Clinton 46%, Obama 28%, Edwards 14%, Kucinich 1%, Gravel 1%, Undecided 10%
IVR Polls Sample Size: 510; Margin of Error: ± 4.3%	December 11, 2007	Clinton 51%, Obama 17%, Edwards 15%, Richardson 8%, Kucinich 1%, Biden 1%, Dodd 0%, Gravel 0%, Undecided 6%
IVR Polls	November 8, 2007	Clinton 51%, Obama 17%, Edwards 11%, Richardson 10%, Kucinich 2%, Biden 1%, Dodd 0%, Gravel 0%, Undecided 8%
IVR Polls	August 30, 2007	Clinton 36.7%, Obama 17.6%, Edwards 14.6%, Richardson 8.9%, Biden 4.2%, Kucinich 3.2%, Gravel 1%, Dodd 0%, Undecided 13.7%
IVR Polls	July 9, 2007	Clinton 42%, Obama 20%, Edwards 12%, Richardson 6%, Biden 3%, Kucinich 1%, Dodd 0%, Gravel 0%
IVR Polls	June 4, 2007	Clinton 40%, Obama 15%, Edwards 13%, Richardson 9%, Kucinich 2%, Biden 1%, Dodd 1%, Gravel 0%
Lyceum Polls	April 26 – May 7, 2007	Clinton 33%, Obama 21%, Edwards 8%, Richardson 3%, Biden 1%, Kucinich 1%, Dodd 0%, Gravel 0%
IVR Polls	April 24, 2007	Clinton 35%, Obama 18%, Edwards 18%, Richardson 7%, Biden 2%, Kucinich 1%, Dodd 0%, Gravel 0%
IVR Polls	March 22, 2007	Clinton 35%, Edwards 19%, Obama 15%, Richardson 7%, Kucinich 3%, Biden 2%, Dodd 1%, Gravel 0%
American Research Group	March 16–19, 2007	Clinton 34%, Obama 32%, Edwards 11%, Biden 4%, Richardson 4%, Dodd 1%, Gravel 0%, Kucinich 0%

=== Vermont ===
Vermont winner: Barack Obama
Format: Primary see: Vermont Democratic primary, 2008
Date: March 4, 2008
Delegates At Stake 15
Delegates Won To be determined
See also

Poll source	Date	Highlights
Rasmussen Sample Size: 1,013; Margin of Error: ± 3%	February 24, 2008	Obama 57%, Clinton 33%, Undecided 10%
American Research Group Sample Size: 600; Margin of Error: ± 4%	February 20–21, 2008	Obama 60%, Clinton 34%, Other 6%
American Research Group	February 2–6, 2007	Clinton 37%, Obama 19%, Edwards 14%, Dodd 3%, Kucinich 3%, Clark 2%, Richardson 1%, undecided 21%
