= United Heritage Credit Union =

- Type: Credit union
- Industry: Financial services
- Founded: 1957
- Headquarters: Austin, Texas
- Number of locations: 11 branches
- Area served: Texas
- Products: Savings accounts, checking accounts, consumer loans, Online Banking, Mobile Banking, ATMs, Insurance, Investments
- Website: uhcu.org

United Heritage Credit Union is a credit union headquartered in Austin, Texas, chartered and regulated under the authority of the Texas Credit Union Department and federally insured by the National Credit Union Administration. United Heritage Credit Union has over $1 billion in assets.

== History ==
United Heritage Credit Union was founded in 1957 as Military Federal Credit Union offering loans and savings to military personnel. In 1969, the credit union expanded as Bergstrom Federal Credit Union, at which time it was able to add more services and increase its membership base. In 1989, the credit union merged with Texas Hospital Association Credit Union, Texas National Guard Credit Union and Healthcare Federal Credit Union. By 1993, the credit union was able to include hospitals, hospital affiliates and select employer groups (SEGs) to its growing membership base. In that same year the credit union changed its name to United Heritage Federal Credit Union. In 1997, the credit union switched from a federal charter to a state charter, officially changing the name to United Heritage Credit Union.

United Heritage has repeatedly been named as one of Austin’s Top 5 Credit Unions by the Austin Business Journal 2019.

In 2015, United Heritage Credit Union made The Financial Brand's list of "Top 100 Credit Unions Using Social Media." That same year, the credit union had a spot on The Financial Brand's list of "25 Inspirational & Responsive Banking Website Designs."

In 2016, the credit union won a number of awards—including a CUNA Diamond Award, Hermes Creative Award, American Business Award and Communicator Award—for its Summer Showtime campaign, an annual social media contest that gives entrants the chance to win tickets to concerts, theme parks and more.

In 2018, United Heritage Credit Union reached $1 Billion in assets.

== Branch locations ==
Throughout the years, the credit union opened multiple branch locations. There are now 10 United Heritage Credit Union branches in Central Texas and Tyler, Texas.
UHCU Branch Locations:
North Austin (Mopac Expressway)
Georgetown
South Austin (Menchaca Rd.)
Round Rock
Cedar Park
Lakeway
Southwest Austin (Slaughter Ln.)
Kyle
River Place
Tyler

== Membership and organization ==
United Heritage Credit Union is a state chartered member-owned financial cooperative with branches in the Austin area and Tyler, Texas. The credit union also provides business services, including checking, savings, investments, insurance and commercial loans.

United Heritage Credit Union is a member of the Alliance of Austin Credit Unions and CO-OP Financial Services and participates as a CU Service Center. United Heritage is currently rated A+ by the Better Business Bureau (BBB).

United Heritage Credit Union membership is available to anyone who lives, works, attends school, or has a business located in Bastrop, Bell, Blanco, Burnet, Caldwell, Hays, Lee, Milam, Travis, Williamson, Cherokee, Gregg, Henderson, Rusk, Smith, Upshur, Van Zandt or Wood county. Membership is also available to family members of current members or anyone who works for an employer on the select employer group list as well as those that join or are current members of the Texas Consumer Council (TXCC).

== Employees ==
United Heritage employs over 200 people in the Austin and Tyler, Texas, areas.

== Products and services ==
United Heritage Credit Union offers products and services found in many other financial institutions, including savings and checking accounts, multiple types of loan products and several investment products, insurance, as well as online and mobile banking services, including Mobile Deposit and Web BillPay. United Heritage also offers several unique products, including Instant Issue Debit Cards, which are instantly issued debit cards that can be printed in minutes at any full-service UHCU branch location.
