= Associated Credit Union =

Credit union based in Norcross, Georgia, US

- Founded: 1930; 96 years ago
- Headquarters: Norcross, Georgia, U.S.
- Number of locations: 18 branches
- Revenue: 54,924,941 United States dollar (2011)
- Total assets: 1,211,590,222 United States dollar (2011)
- Number of employees: 366
- Website: www.acuonline.org

Associated Credit Union is a credit union based in Norcross, Georgia.

Associated Credit Union is the fifth largest credit union in Georgia with over 165,000 members and assets of $2.2 billion as of December 2023. They operate 18 branch locations and 25 Interactive Teller Machines (ITMs) in Georgia. In addition, Associated Credit Union belongs to the CO-OP Network which provides its members access to over 30,000 surcharge-free ATMs and 5,000 Shared Branch locations.
