= Arsenal Credit Union =

Credit union in St. Louis metropolitan area

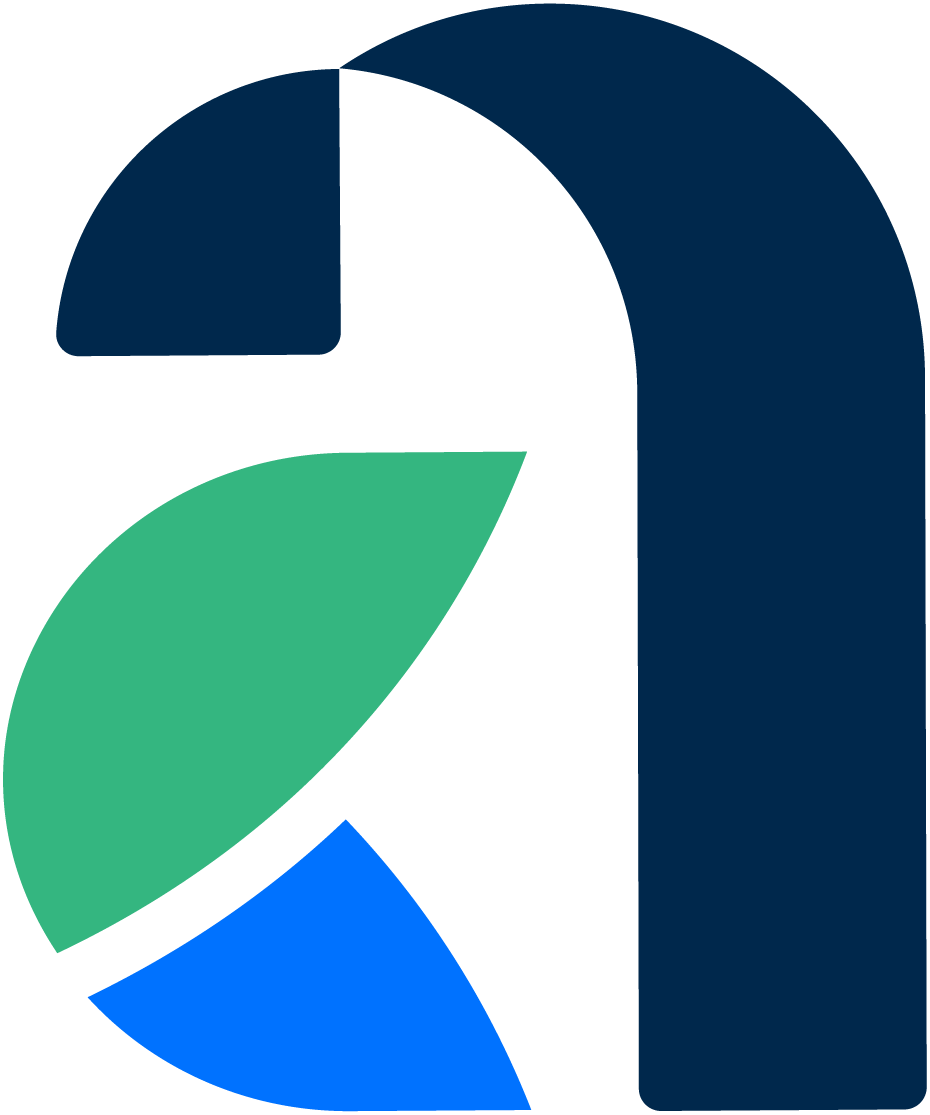
- Formation: 1948
- Type: Credit union
- Headquarters: Arnold, Missouri, United States
- Region served: St. Louis metro area
- Members: 30,246 (August 2025)
- Website: www.arsenalcu.com

Arsenal Credit Union (ACU) provides financial products and services to people who live and work in the St. Louis metropolitan area. The credit union is chartered and regulated under the authority of the Missouri Division of Credit Unions. Member deposits are federally insured to at least $250,000 by the National Credit Union Administration (NCUA), a U.S. government agency. The credit union has four branches and is headquartered in Arnold, Missouri. ACU is the 7th-largest credit union in St. Louis and the 9th-largest in Missouri based on asset size ($431.6 million as of June 2025).

== History ==
Arsenal Credit Union was founded in August 1948 as Aero Chart Credit Union and organized to serve employees of a U.S. government agency then known as the Aero Chart Service, Plant and Store (now the National Geospatial-Intelligence Agency, or NGA). The name changed to Arsenal Credit Union in 1952, a tribute to what NGA's current campus, along the banks of the Mississippi River in south St. Louis, used to be known as the "St. Louis Arsenal" back in the country's Civil War days. During this time, the site had warehoused small arms, artillery, gun carriages, ammunition and gunpowder.

== Field of membership ==
In Missouri, membership is open to those who live or work in St. Louis County, Jefferson County, Franklin County, Washington County, St. Francois County, and Ste. Genevieve County. The credit union also offers membership in Illinois, which is available to those who live or work in St. Clair County, Madison County, Monroe County, and Randolph County. Arsenal also serves those who live or work in select ZIP codes in Jasper County (64801), Miller County (65026), Camden County (65049 & 65065), and Morgan County (65072) in the state of Missouri. Those who have a parent, grandparent, brother, sister, child, grandchild, spouse, aunt, uncle, niece, nephew, first cousin or legal guardian who is eligible to be an Arsenal member can join through them. This includes steps, in-laws and legally adoptive relationships.

Those employed by or who have retired from the NGA, and those who work for the Department of Veterans Affairs (Veterans Administration) are also eligible to join. Those who belong to the following labor organizations can join the credit union:

- Bakers, Confectioners, Tobacco Workers and Grain Millers (BCTGM) Local 4
- Communication Workers of America (CWA) 4217
- Iron Workers Local 396
- Service Employees International Union (SEIU) Healthcare Illinois
- United Food and Commercial Workers (UFCW) Local 534

== Locations ==
Arsenal Credit Union has four public locations in the following St. Louis metro areas: Arnold, Webster Groves, Florissant, and in Swansea, Illinois.

Arsenal is part of the Credit Union Shared Branch network, which gives members the ability to transactions on their Arsenal accounts at more than 70 other credit union shared branch locations in the St. Louis metro area and more than 5,800 nationwide. It is also a member of the CO-OP Network of ATMs, which gives members free access to more than 250 ATMs in the St. Louis area and 30,000 nationwide.

== Products and services ==
Arsenal Credit Union offers a full complement of loans, deposit accounts and convenience services for its members. It also offers unique products not available from most financial institutions.

- A Premier Checking account that offers high yields with fewer requirements than other financial institutions.
- A Free Checking account with no monthly maintenance fees or monthly minimum balance requirements.
- Instant-issue debit cards available at its four public branches.
- Digital banking tools designed to help members see the complete picture of their finances, improve their credit scores and help fight fraud.
- Home equity loans with no closing costs.
- Investment, retirement and insurance services through a third-party partner.

In addition to consumer services, Arsenal offers loans and deposit accounts for local small businesses.

== Community Impact Fund ==
In 2020, during the COVID-19 pandemic, nonprofit organizations began to struggle due to a lack of donations coming in. Arsenal Credit Union sought a way to help area nonprofits better serve their clients. The Arsenal Community Impact Fund was created to help these organizations do what they do best: serve the community in the unique ways they're equipped to do so. To date, Arsenal has awarded $84,900 to over 30 organizations in the community.
