= Rogue Credit Union =

- Type: Not-for-profit
- Industry: Banking and Finance
- Founded: 1956
- Headquarters: Medford, Oregon, United States
- Area served: Coos County, Oregon; Del Norte County, California; Curry County, Oregon; Douglas County, Oregon; Jackson County, Oregon; Josephine County, Oregon; Klamath County, Oregon; Malheur County, Oregon; Payette County, Idaho
- Key people: Matt Stephenson (CEO)
- Services: Financial services · Retail banking · Online banking · Mobile banking · Investment services
- Total assets: US$3.33 billion (September 2023)
- Website: www.roguecu.org

Rogue Credit Union, formerly Rogue Federal Credit Union, is an American Oregon State chartered credit union and financial holding company headquartered in Medford, Oregon, United States. As of 2022, the credit union's assets are US$3.70 billion. Rogue Credit Union's branch network serves Southwest Oregon counties of Coos, Curry, Douglas, Jackson, Josephine, Malheur and Klamath County, as well as Payette County in Idaho and Del Norte County, California.

== History ==
Rogue Credit Union was founded as Jackson County Teachers Federal Credit Union (JCTFCU) in 1956 by 10 Southern Oregon teachers. Membership was originally open to public school employees in Jackson County, employees of the credit union, members of their immediate families, and organizations to which these people belonged.

Jackson County Teachers Federal Credit Union changes its name to Jackson Public Service Federal Credit Union expanding membership for city, county, state, and school employees. The name was changed to Rogue Federal Credit Union following a merger in 1982 which also added federal employees to eligibility. Later In 1977, the credit union began offering checking accounts and expanded its charter as a community based credit union.

In 2000, Rogue Credit Union had 32,000 members and US$185 million in assets, and was approved in 2001 by the National Credit Union Administration to expand their branch network into Josephine and Klamath County.

Rogue Credit Union purchased and assumed Chetco Federal Credit Union in 2012 from the National Credit Union Administration, acquiring branches in Curry, Coos County, Oregon and Del Norte County, California, with a total combined membership of 71,000 members and US$809 million in assets. In 2021, a merger with Malheur Federal Credit Union brought Rogue Credit Union into Eastern Oregon and Western Idaho.

After the mass shooting at Umpqua Community College in Roseburg, Oregon, Rogue Credit Union raised funds to support the victims in the shooting, and planned on giving up to $7,500 to them.

In January 2016, Gene Pelham, CEO of Rogue Credit Union 2007-2022, began a three-year term on the Federal Reserve System's Twelfth District Community Depository Institutions Advisory Council in San Francisco, California. The council meets twice a year, submitting input to senior Federal Reserve Bank management on different bank and economic conditions and policies.

The credit union reached US$1.137 billion in assets in April 2016, a milestone in the company's history. Circa 85 percent, or $860.4 million, of the credit union assets, is presently tied up in loans and $154 million is invested in government-backed bonds and securities. Gene Pelham, said that his organization's growth rate is "among the top five credit unions in the country."

In 2022, former Executive Vice President Matt Stephenson became Rogue Credit Union's new president/CEO. He is the 5th CEO in the credit unions history.

== See also ==
- List of credit unions in the United States
- List of companies based in Oregon
