= Hawaii Community Federal Credit Union =

Credit union in Hawaii, United States

Hawaii Community Federal Credit Union (HCFCU) is a federally chartered credit union, headquartered in Kailua Kona, Hawaii, with its branches in western and northern Hawaii.

== General ==
Hawaii Community Federal Credit Union (HCFCU) is a federally chartered credit union, headquartered in Kailua Kona, Hawaii, and regulated under the authority of the National Credit Union Administration (NCUA). Besides its main office in Kaloko, Kailua Kona, it has its branches in downtown Kailua Kona, Kealakekua, Kohala, and Honoka'a. It participates in the Hawaii Network of Hawaii's credit unions.

== History ==
Hawaii Community Federal Credit Union's history goes back to 1936, when Kona Farmers Federal Credit Union was established by ten Kona coffee farmers. It changed its name to Kona Community Federal Credit Union in 1939 when it started to take in the general public, and grew bigger in 1982, when Kohala Federal Credit Union was merged. It changed its name to the current one in 1992.

== See also ==
- List of credit unions in the United States
- HFS Federal Credit Union (Headquartered in Hilo, Hawaii)
