= PSCU =

Credit union service organization

Velera
- Type: Private
- Industry: Credit union
- Founded: 1977
- Headquarters: St. Petersburg, Florida
- Services: Credit, debit ATM and prepaid card processing, electronic banking and bill payment
- Number of employees: 5000
- Website: www.velera.com

Velera, formerly Payment Systems for Credit Unions or PSCU, is the largest credit union service organization in the United States. The organization was founded in 1977 and is based in St. Petersburg, Florida.

== History ==
In 1977, five Florida credit unions joined and founded PSCU. PSCU started a mobile banking platform compatible with iOS in November 2009. That same year, the company released its CardLock fraud prevention program. PSCU was the first organization to issue Visa pre-paid EMV cards in August 2012. The company hosts an annual 24-hour brainstorming competition which aims to create technology for the banking community that began in 2012.

PSCU announced in February 2013 that the company would be partnered with MasterCard to make the MasterPass technology available to the members of the credit union. The company chose PricewaterhouseCoopers in April 2013 to serve as an external independent certified public accounting firm for auditing and tax services for the company. In June 2013, PSCU opened a data center in Phoenix, Arizona. The organization started "Make Your Money Matter," an online and social media campaign that educated consumers on the difference between banks and credit unions, in 2013.

In February 2014, PSCU received a patent for the CardLock fraud prevention system. The initiative won an award for best website in the educational resources category at South by Southwest in Austin, Texas. By March 2015, the program covered 250 credit unions.

In March 2015, Chuck Fagan, former president of the Credit Union Executive Society, was named CEO of PSCU. PSCU won a Stevie Award for Contact Center of the Year in the Financial Service Industry in 2015.

PSCU partnered with Colonial Williamsburg on electronic educational programs for schools in the United States.

In November 2023, St. Petersburg-based PSCU announced a merger with the California fintech firm Co-op Solutions, creating a new organization with over 5,000 employees and an annual revenue of $1.3 billion. The merger, expected to close by the end of 2023, will integrate the operations under a holding company at PSCU's headquarters. PSCU President and CEO Charles "Chuck" Fagan will lead the new entity, which aims to be the premier fintech solutions provider, enhancing growth and innovation in line with the evolving payments landscape. This development follows PSCU's recent investments in digital technology and the acquisition of Juniper Payments LLC to enhance payment processing speeds.

Immediately after the merger, the company was called PCSU/Co-op Solutions. In January 2024, it rebranded itself as Velera, however the company planned to retain Co-op Solutions as a brand name for its ATM network and shared branching services.
