= Buckeye State Credit Union =

- Company type: Credit union
- Industry: Financial services
- Founded: March 1933; 92 years ago
- Founders: Akron Postal employees
- Headquarters: Akron, Ohio, United States
- Area served: Northeast Ohio
- Services: Banking services, Mortgages
- Number of employees: 72 (2023)
- Website: www.buckeyecu.org

Buckeye State Credit Union is an American credit union headquartered in Akron, Ohio, chartered and regulated under the authority of American Share Insurance (ASI). Buckeye has an administrative office and four branches serving Northeast Ohio.

== History ==
Buckeye State Credit Union was founded in 1933, in support of United States Postal Service employees in Northeastern Ohio. The Akron Postal employees established the Federal Employees Credit Union, which in March 1933 received its charter from the State of Ohio. The credit union operated in the Akron Post Office until 1968 when the now administrative office building was built on Voris Street in Akron, Ohio.there was an office in Columbus Ohio for a short time.

In 1975, the Credit Union changed its name to Buckeye State Credit Union. It has branches in Mansfield, OhioShaker Heights, Akron, Canton and Alliance.
