= Michigan State University Federal Credit Union =

Financial institution

- Type: Credit union
- Industry: Financial services
- Founded: 1937
- Headquarters: East Lansing, Michigan, U.S.
- Number of locations: 24 (2023)
- Key people: April M. Clobes (President and CEO)
- Products: Savings checking Consumer loans Mortgages; Credit cards Investments; Business accounts
- Total assets: $9.2 billion USD (2026)
- Number of employees: 1,261 (2023)
- Website: msufcu.org

The Michigan State University Federal Credit Union (MSUFCU) is a credit union headquartered in East Lansing, Michigan. Primarily serving students and alumni of Michigan State University and Oakland University, MSUFCU is federally chartered and regulated by the National Credit Union Administration (NCUA). MSUFCU is the largest university-based credit union in the world, and the second-largest credit union in Michigan.

MSUFCU provides a variety of financial services, including deposit accounts, personal and business loans, investments, and insurance. MSUFCU is owned by its members, which elect a board of directors to oversee its operations. As of November 2026, MSUFCU has 39 branches (in Michigan and Illinois), over 400,000 members, more than $9.2 billion in assets, and over 1,300 employees. It is a member of the CO-OP ATM network.

== History ==
In 1937, eight faculty and staff members at the Michigan State College of Agriculture and Applied Science founded the state-chartered Michigan State College Employees Credit Union (MSCECU). Its assets and ledgers were kept in a desk drawer at the College's administration building.

In 1955, Michigan State University adopted its current name, and MSCECU was renamed Michigan State University Employees Credit Union (MSUECU). MSUECU established its office in the Power House Plant on MSU's campus the following year. The Credit Union relocated its main office across MSU’s campus to 600 E Crescent Road in 1971, as its membership and assets continued to increase.

MSUFCU was state-chartered until 1979, when it obtained a federal charter and adopted its current name. By that time, MSUFCU had grown to $40 million in assets and 29,244 members; by 1985, it held $100 million in assets and had 40,000 members.

=== 2000s: Lansing-area expansion ===
MSUFCU continued to grow in the early 2000s with the West Side Lansing branch opening in 2003, the South Lansing branch in 2005, and the MSU Union branch on MSU's campus in 2006.

MSUFCU opened a new headquarters building in East Lansing in 2008. The building was constructed using green building standards and received a gold Leadership in Energy and Environmental Design (LEED) certification. A 186,350 square-foot expansion to the headquarters campus was announced in November 2014 houses a call center, information technology department, and other member service departments. The second building on MSUFCU’s headquarters campus celebrated its grand opening in October 2017, coinciding with MSUFCU’S 80th anniversary.

In April 2011, MSUFCU expanded into downtown Lansing, with a new branch located on Washington Avenue. The next year, a third MSU campus branch was opened, as well as a location in Haslett. A branch at Sparrow Hospital opened in 2013, and two additional locations, in Okemos and Mason, opened in 2014.

In March 2015, after 41 years with MSUFCU, Patrick McPharlin retired as president and CEO, and was succeeded by April Clobes. Prior to becoming president and CEO, Clobes spent 18 years with MSUFCU, and served in a number of executive roles, including Chief Operating Officer.

=== 2010s–2020s: expansions and acquisitions ===
MSUFCU merged with Eaton County Educational Credit Union (ECECU), based in nearby Charlotte, in April 2013. Following the merger, which was approved overwhelmingly by ECECU's members, MSUFCU absorbed ECECU's single location in Charlotte as a new branch.

In March 2016, MSUFCU merged with Clarkston Brandon Community Credit Union (CBCCU), headquartered in Clarkston, Michigan, with a branch in Ortonville. CBCCU had previously been conserved by state and federal regulators amid an embezzlement scandal that January, and had 8,536 members and $41 million in assets at the time of the merger. The acquisition marked MSUFCU's first major expansion into Metro Detroit, a region home to over 100,000 MSU and OU alumni. Following the CBCCU merger, MSUFCU expanded further into the Detroit area with a new branch in Berkley in 2019; the following year, the Clarkston branch was relocated. In February 2022, MSUFCU established a new Detroit-area regional office in Auburn Hills.

MSUFCU's first expansion into West Michigan came with a Grand Rapids branch in the fall of 2017. MSUFCU later opened a branch in Traverse City, its first in Northern Michigan, on June 30, 2020; a second Traverse City branch followed on June 29, 2021. Then, in April 2023, MSUFCU opened a branch in downtown Detroit, its first in the city, followed by a second Grand Rapids-area branch, in Kentwood, that May.

In July 2023, MSUFCU announced its first expansion outside Michigan, with plans to open five new branches on Chicago's north side in 2024. In choosing to expand into Illinois, the credit union cited a large population of MSU alumni residing in the Chicago area. Later, in August 2023, MSUFCU announced its acquisition of McHenry, Illinois-based McHenry Savings Bank for $36-38 million, further expanding into Chicagoland. A week later, MSUFCU announced the acquisition of a second Chicago-area bank, Algonquin State Bank.

In November 2023, MSUFCU announced its acquisition of Lansing-based Gabriels Community Credit Union, as well as plans for two new Detroit-area branches, to be built in Novi and Brighton.

In October 2026, MSUFCU and University Federal Credit Union (UFCU) of Austin, Texas, announced plans to combine, pending regulatory approval. The combined credit union would have about $13.5 billion in assets and more than 850,000 members and would take the name University Federal Credit Union, with Clobes as chief executive and UFCU's Michael Crowl as president. Both credit unions said they would continue to operate under their current names in their regions.

== Oakland University ==
Oakland University Credit Union
- Website: www.oucreditunion.org

MSUFCU is the official credit union and financial services partner of Oakland University (OU), and operates its services there under the Oakland University Credit Union (OUCU) brand. The OUCU brand is also used by MSUFCU's other branches across Oakland County.

MSUFCU has served Oakland University since its founding as Michigan State University-Oakland in 1957, opening a branch near the campus in Pontiac Township (now Auburn Hills) in 1967. Following OU's separation from MSU in 1970, MSUFCU continued to partner with the institution. In January 2014, MSUFCU became OU's official credit union, and adopted the OUCU branding. A branch was soon opened in the Oakland Center on OU's campus, and several OUCU ATMs were installed in campus buildings. A new branch and regional office opened near the university in Auburn Hills in February 2022.
