= South Carolina Federal Credit Union =

- Type: Credit union
- Industry: Financial services
- Founded: 1936
- Headquarters: North Charleston, South Carolina, United States
- Products: Savings; checking; consumer loans; mortgages; credit cards; online banking
- Total assets: $2.5B USD (2024)
- Website: scfederal.org

South Carolina Federal Credit Union (or South Carolina Federal) is an American credit union headquartered in North Charleston, South Carolina, that is supervised and insured by the National Credit Union Administration (NCUA), an agency of the U.S. government.

South Carolina Federal is the largest, oldest, member-owned financial institution in the Charleston tricounty area. As of 2024, South Carolina Federal had over $2.5 billion in assets and over 175,000 active members.

== History ==
South Carolina Federal originated on January 31st, 1936, at the Charleston Naval Shipyard in North Charleston, when fourteen Navy Shipyard workers each contributed $5 to create the Navy Yard Employees Credit Union.

In 1960, the credit union changed its name to the Charleston Naval Shipyard (CNS) Federal Credit Union when its field of membership expanded to include Navy personnel who worked at the Navy Yard or were home-ported at the naval base. In 1965, CNS became the first credit union in South Carolina to have its own facility. By 1969, CNS opened its first branch on the Naval Station. Other branch locations quickly followed.

During the 1980s, CNS capitalized on legal changes that enabled credit unions to serve as full-service financial institutions. The NCUA during this time also allowed credit unions to open their fields of membership to "unlike groups," permitting CNS to accept members from groups or organizations beyond those associated with the Shipyard. These developments contributed to several smaller credit unions merging with CNS during the 80s. By the end of 1985, as CNS was nearing its 50th anniversary, it had assets of $221 million and served 103,844 members.

The U.S. Navy closed the Charleston Naval Shipyard and naval base on April 1, 1994, but CNS' member base was robust enough that the credit union was able to withstand the loss. In recognition of the changed environment and the credit union's broad membership, CNS changed its name on August 9, 1994, to South Carolina Federal Credit Union.

During the 1990s, South Carolina Federal expanded beyond the Charleston area for the first time, into Georgetown and Columbia, S.C. In 2003, South Carolina Federal changed its status from a select employer group to a community-chartered credit union. In May 2004, South Carolina Federal reached a major financial landmark when assets hit $1 billion.

== Organization ==
South Carolina Federal is a multiple common bond credit union.

Credit unions are owned and governed by the people who use its services. Those people are called "members" and each member is an equal owner of the institution. Members elect and serve as the credit union's volunteer board of directors, which establishes and reviews policies, based on what is best for the collective membership.

South Carolina Federal's Supervisory Committee, made up of volunteers appointed by the board, is responsible to ensure that the credit union's financial condition is presented accurately in financial statements and that management practices and procedures safeguard members' assets.

South Carolina Federal is committed to giving back to the communities it serves. Through corporate social responsibility, civic memberships and the South Carolina Federal Credit Union Foundation, the credit union infuses nearly $400,000 back into the region each year.

== Membership ==
Membership includes more than 175,000 people with $2.5 billion in capital, the member-owned cooperative operates 30 offices in seven major markets to include Charleston, Columbia, Florence, Georgetown, Greenville, Myrtle Beach, and Spartanburg.

== Services ==
South Carolina Federal is a full-service credit union that offers consumer and business products and services that are comparable to most larger financial institutions. Products and services include personal checking, savings, debit and credit cards and loans, and business checking, business savings, business debit and credit cards and business loans suitable for members who own small businesses. South Carolina Federal also offers free financial education workshops to its members, the public and businesses within its field of membership.

South Carolina Federal has 30 financial centers and many ATMs throughout the state of South Carolina. Members also have free access to over 50,000 Allpoint network ATMs nationwide.

== Competition ==
South Carolina Federal counts among its competitors other credit unions, such as REV Federal Credit Union, and banks, such as South State Bank, that maintain a presence in the same local areas and offer a relatively comparable suite of products.
