= Sunbelt Federal Credit Union =

Banking institution in Mississippi, US

- Type: Credit union
- Industry: Financial services
- Predecessor: Masonite Employees Federal Credit Union
- Founded: October 16, 1953; 72 years ago
- Founder: Employees of Masonite fabrication plant
- Headquarters: Hattiesburg, Mississippi, United States
- Area served: Pine Belt region of southern Mississippi
- Products: Retail banking; mortgages; loans
- Owner: Members
- Website: sunbeltfcu.org

Sunbelt Federal Credit Union (commonly referred to as SFCU), is an American full-service, nonprofit credit union offering financial products and services across the Pine Belt region of southern Mississippi.

As of 2023, SFCU had grown to house over 220 million dollars in assets and service over 30,000 members, with full-service financial services.

== History ==
=== Foundation ===
Central Sunbelt was originally chartered as the Masonite Employees Federal Credit Union on October 16, 1953. Masonite, a wood product fabricated for production of doors, roofing, walls, and house siding, was invented in Laurel, Mississippi, in 1924 by William H. Mason, a friend to Thomas Edison. Mass production of masonite began shortly after 1929 and the size of the company quickly grew with the demands of the masonite product. The employees of Masonite soon found the need for a financial institution to service the needs of the growing employee base and established a federally chartered credit union on October 16, 1963.

=== Expansion ===
Within twenty years, the credit union that once began to serve a single company's employee base was now a financial institution serving a large part of the growing community. The board of directors found it necessary to update the name of Masonite Employees Federal Credit Union to better adapt to the growing membership base. The credit union name changed January 1, 1983, to Central Sunbelt Federal Credit Union, as the result of expanding the field of membership to include other employee groups. In May 1991, Central Sunbelt aimed to fit the growing needs of the membership base with a second branch in the neighboring City of Hattiesburg. Soon after, a second office in Laurel was established on Sawmill Road in April 1995. A fourth branch was constructed on Lincoln Road in Hattiesburg in July 2000. In July, 2012, a fifth location was built to service McComb, in Pike County) as Central Sunbelt merged in Pike County Teachers Federal Credit Union. In January 2015, Central Sunbelt launched a new branch in Waynesboro, the seat of Wayne County, Mississippi.

=== Mergers ===
- Masonite Employees FCU
- Jones County School District FCU
- Black Creek FCU
- Pike County Teachers FCU
- Lamar County FCU
- Green County FCU
- Howard Employees FCU

In March 2019, Central Sunbelt Federal Credit Union changed its name to Sunbelt Federal Credit Union.

=== 2023 ===
By 2023, Central Sunbelt was the third largest credit union in the state, servicing several hundred select employee groups (SEGs) as well as those who live, work, worship, volunteer, and attend school in the expansion areas of Jones County, Pike County, Simpson County, Wayne County, and parts of Forrest, Lamar, and Convington counties.
