= American Consumer Council =

US non-profit credit union support organization

- Abbreviation: ACC
- Formation: 1987; 39 years ago
- Type: 501(c)(3)
- Tax ID no.: 33-0718596
- Legal status: nonprofit organization
- Location: San Diego, California, United States
- Funding: Membership fees
- Website: americanconsumercouncil.org

The American Consumer Council (ACC) is an American non-profit organization founded in 1987 that is a gateway to membership in various credit unions. In addition it provides consumer education, advocacy and financial literacy to its members.

The United States Federal Credit Union Act requires a credit union to limit membership. Members must either share a single common bond of association or occupation, or various common-bond groups can coalesce to make a “multiple common-bond” credit union. In this context, ACC serves as a "select employee group" or "SEG," which allows persons to join a credit union in a sponsorship relationship with ACC.

Examples of partnering credit unions for which ACC is a gateway are True Sky Federal Credit Union of Oklahoma City and Quorum Federal Credit Union of Purchase, New York.
