= California Credit Union =

Financial services company

California Federal Credit Union
- Type: Credit Union
- Industry: Financial
- Founded: 1933
- Headquarters: Glendale, California, United States
- Number of locations: 24
- Area served: Orange County, Riverside County, San Diego County (as North Island CU)
- Key people: Steve O'Connel, CEO
- Products: Savings; Checking; Consumer Loans; Mortgages; Online Banking
- Total assets: $3 billion (2017)
- Website: www.ccu.com

California Federal Credit Union, doing business as California Credit Union (CCU), previously known as the Los Angeles Teachers Credit Union, is a federally-chartered credit union in Southern California that focuses on providing financial services to residents of six Southern California counties as well as teachers and others in the education community.

== History ==
Los Angeles Teachers Credit Union was founded in 1933 to provide financial services to teachers and others in the education community.

In 1995 the credit union changed its name to California Credit Union.

A branch of the credit union was held up by three armed robbers in 1996.

In 2011, the credit union reacquired the building at 701 N. Brand in Los Angeles as its headquarters from MPG Office Trust. The credit union had originally sold the building in 2006.

Effective March 1, 2017, it merged with North Island Credit Union of San Diego.

== Membership ==
CCU has more than 165,000 members. Membership is available to individuals and businesses in Los Angeles, Orange, Riverside, San Bernardino, Ventura and San Diego counties as well as to residents of California who meet one of the following requirements:

- Los Angeles Unified School District employee
- Los Angeles County Office of Education employee
- Retired educator
- Charter school employee
- College / university employee
- Private school employee
- Alumni association member
- Parent Teacher Association member

== Regulation ==
California Credit Union is regulated under the authority of both the California Department of Financial Institutions and the National Credit Union Administration (NCUA), an agency of the U.S. federal government. Deposits are federally insured by the NCUA.
