= Ascend Federal Credit Union =

- Type: Credit Union
- Industry: Financial services
- Founded: 1951
- Headquarters: Tullahoma, Tennessee, United States
- Area served: Middle Tennessee
- Key people: Matt Jernigan, President and CEO
- Products: Savings; Checking; Consumer loans; Mortgages; Credit cards; Investments; Insurance;
- Total assets: $4.4B+ USD
- Number of employees: 625
- Website: ascend.org

Ascend Federal Credit Union (or Ascend; formerly AEDC Federal Credit Union) is a federally chartered credit union based in Tullahoma, Tennessee. Ascend is regulated and insured through the National Credit Union Administration (NCUA).

Ascend has over 260,000 members and $4.5 billion USD in assets.

As of 2025, Ascend has 27 branches across 12 counties in Middle Tennessee, including five locations in Murfreesboro, three in Nashville, and one each in Brentwood, Columbia, Cookeville, Dickson, Franklin, Gallatin, Hendersonville, Hermitage, La Vergne, Lebanon, Lewisburg, Manchester, McMinnville, Mt. Juliet, Shelbyville, Smyrna, Spring Hill, Tullahoma, and Winchester.

== History ==
Ascend Federal Credit Union was chartered on July 12, 1951, to serve employees of Arnold Air Force Base.

In 2006, the company changed its name from AEDC Federal Credit Union to Ascend Federal Credit Union.

Ascend secured name sponsor rights of Nashville's 6,800-person capacity downtown outdoor concert venue, Ascend Amphitheater, in 2015.

The company completed construction on its corporate headquarters building in Tullahoma, Tennessee, in 2010, and it was renamed in 2023 in honor of former Ascend President and CEO Caren Gabriel.

In 2021, Ascend opened a regional operations center in Murfreesboro, Tennessee.

On April 27, 2026 Ascend and LGECCU, a credit union in the Atlanta area announced plans to merge. Although termed a merger of equals, the Ascend name will survive and the headquarters will be in Tullahoma with Ascend president Matt Jernigan serving as president of the merged company. The merger, is expected to close during the 4th quarter of 2026 or 1st quarter of 2027 pending regulatory approval and approval of members of both credit unions.

=== Management ===
Matt Jernigan was named Ascend's president and CEO on April 7, 2023.

== Community involvement ==
Ascend has established partnerships with local organizations, non-profits and educational institutions. Ascend categorizes its involvement into seven key areas: education and financial literacy, the well-being of children, veteran care and support, mental and physical health, fighting against hunger, supporting diverse communities, and environmental and natural resources.

Ascend's local partners include Operation Stand Down Tennessee, Second Harvest Food Bank, American Red Cross, Leukemia and Lymphoma Society, Susan G. Komen Tennessee, Monroe Carell Jr. Children's Hospital at Vanderbilt, and Middle Tennessee State University.

Ascend also offers financial well-being resources, such as a free online Financial Education Center where visitors can broaden their knowledge on a variety of financial topics without the need of a membership.
