= Nusenda Credit Union =

- Company type: Credit union
- Industry: Financial services
- Founded: 1936
- Headquarters: Albuquerque, New Mexico, United States
- Area served: Taos, NM Santa Fe, NM Rio Rancho, NM Albuquerque, NM Valencia County, NM Socorro, NM Deming, NM Las Cruces, NM El Paso, TX
- Key people: Ralph Wallace, Board of Directors Chair; Michelle Dearholt, President/CEO
- Products: Savings; checking; consumer loans; mortgages; credit cards; online banking
- Total assets: $4.7B USD (2024)
- Members: 280,000+
- Number of employees: 900+
- Website: nusenda.org

Nusenda Credit Union is a federally-chartered credit union headquartered in Albuquerque, New Mexico, and regulated under the authority of the National Credit Union Administration (NCUA). Nusenda Credit Union is the largest credit union by membership in New Mexico. As of 2024, Nusenda Credit Union had more than $4.7 billion in assets, more than 280,000 members, and more than 30 branches in New Mexico and West Texas.

Nusenda Credit Union serves employees of educational institutions, along with more than 600 other local businesses, systems, and organizations, operating under multiple common bonds. Member deposits up to $250,000 are insured by NCUA through the National Credit Union Share Insurance Fund.

Nusenda Credit Union donates to charities and organizations in its communities. In 2007 the credit union assisted the University of New Mexico in establishing a wireless network on their main campus. They opened a credit union branch in Atrisco Heritage Academy to promote financial literacy in 2010.

== History ==
The credit union was founded in 1936 as the Albuquerque Public Schools Federal Credit Union. Its field of membership grew to include employees of Albuquerque Technical-Vocational Institute in 1968. Ten years later, employees of the University of New Mexico and University of New Mexico Hospital were added. To reflect its changed membership, the credit union changed its name to New Mexico Educators Federal Credit Union in 1982. Members of La Montañita Food Co-op became eligible for membership in 1984. New Mexico Educators Federal Credit Union continued to grow its assets and membership over the years and built new branches. In February 2015, the credit union changed its name again, to Nusenda Credit Union after collecting member feedback about its name for more than a decade and conducting more than a year of in-depth research.
