= Clearview Federal Credit Union =

Credit union in Southwestern Pennsylvania, US

- Formerly: Allegheny Airlines Federal Credit Union
- Industry: Credit union
- Founded: 1953
- Headquarters: Moon Township, Pennsylvania
- Key people: Lisa Florian (President & CEO)
- Website: www.clearviewfcu.org

Clearview Federal Credit Union is a credit union based in Moon Township, Pennsylvania, near Pittsburgh. Clearview serves people who live, work, worship, attend school or volunteer and businesses and legal entities in the Southwestern Pennsylvania community which includes Allegheny, Armstrong, Beaver, Butler, Fayette, Greene, Indiana, Lawrence, Washington and Westmoreland counties.

== History ==
The credit union started out as the Allegheny Airlines Federal Credit Union in 1953 in Washington, D.C., where it was based before moving to the Pittsburgh area in 1966. Although it was originally for employees for Allegheny Airlines (the predecessor to U.S. Airways), it expanded through various mergers and acquisitions of other credit unions.

After various name changes to reflect its affiliation with the airline, the name was changed to Clearview in 2004 and its charter was changed to allow anyone who worked or lived in Southwestern Pennsylvania to join. Since then, they have expanded through opening new locations throughout the area and in neighboring areas.

Clearview primarily competes with smaller credit unions, in addition to banks such as PNC Bank, Citizens Bank, Dollar Bank, and Huntington Bank.
