= Meriwest Credit Union =

- Company type: Credit Union
- Industry: Financial services
- Founded: May 5, 1961; 65 years ago
- Headquarters: San Jose, California, United States
- Area served: Greater San Francisco Bay Area
- Key people: Lisa Pesta, President/CEO; Brian Hennessey, CFO; Chad Maze, COO Board of Directors; Arthur Jue, Chairman; Scott Timpe, Vice Chairman; Harsha Vyas, Treasurer; Rosario Monge, Secretary; Udey Chaudhry, Director; Edwin Mach, Director; Steve Goveia, Director; Stan Chapman, Director; Jim Hicks, Director Supervisory Committee; Phil Fluegemann, Chairman; Taylor Lee, Secretary; Jason Laker, Member
- Subsidiaries: Meriwest Mortgage, MW Wealth Advisors
- Website: www.meriwest.com

Meriwest Credit Union is an American member owned, not-for-profit credit union located in San Jose, California. The credit union offers financial services to communities in the Greater San Francisco Bay Area.

As of 2023, Meriwest Credit Union had over 80,000 members and $2.2 billion in total assets.

== History ==
The credit union began on May 5, 1961, when a group of IBM employees organized the IBM San Jose Employees Federal Credit Union. In 1975 the official name changed to Pacific IBM Employees Federal Credit Union. In 1999, the Credit Union converted to state charter and changed its name to Meriwest Credit Union. In 2007, Meriwest merged with Golden Bay Federal Credit Union.

== Community relationship ==
Meriwest Credit Union has a long history of providing support to its local communities by partnering with local charities and non-profit organizations, as well as providing free educational resources.

In 2022, the Credit Union National Association (CUNA) awarded Meriwest the 2022 National Desjardins Adult Financial Education Award for its workshops & programs to promote financial literacy.

== Membership requirements ==
At least one of these options listed below will apply:

- Live, work, or attend school in select counties within the Greater San Francisco Bay Area of Northern California, or Tucson, Arizona.
- Employee of a participating Meriwest Credit Union member company.
- Relative of or reside with a current member of Meriwest Credit Union.

== Regulation ==
Meriwest Credit Union is chartered under the authority of the California Department of Financial Protection and Innovation (DFPI). Members' deposits are federally insured up to $250,000 by the National Credit Union Administration (NCUA), an agency of the U.S. federal government.
