= AmeriCU Credit Union =

Credit union in Central New York, United States

- Company type: Credit union
- Industry: Financial services
- Founded: 1951; 75 years ago
- Headquarters: Rome, New York, United States
- Number of locations: 20 financial centers
- Area served: Central New York, Northern New York
- Products: Savings; checking; consumer loans; mortgages; credit cards
- Total assets: $2.82B USD (2025)
- Members: 169,402
- Website: www.americu.org

AmeriCU Credit Union (AmeriCU) is an American chartered credit union headquartered in Rome, New York. Eligibility is open to those who live, work, worship or attend school in Central or Northern New York State as well as member and family members of active-duty, reserves, or veterans of the U.S. Military.

As of 2025, AmeriCU had more than 160,000 members and over $2 billion in assets, and was the 12th largest credit union in New York.

== History ==
It was originally founded in 1950 as Griffiss Employees Credit Union.

In 2018 and in 2020, AmeriCU was named one of the Best Companies to Work for in New York State. In 2019, it was chosen by Forbes as one of the best Credit Unions in New York State. The Credit Union National Association (CUNA) recognized AmeriCU in its Ongoing Event category for the Salute to the Troops Tribute Concert and the Marketing Association of Credit Unions (MAC) awarded AmeriCU two bronze awards for Website Design and Community Engagement in 2020.

AmeriCU branch footprint as of 2025

== Governance ==
AmeriCU is a not-for-profit financial institution owned and governed by its members. Ron Belle is the current President and CEO of AmeriCU Credit Union. Each year, the membership of the credit union votes for members who will serve as Directors on its seven-member, all-volunteer Board of Directors. Among other duties, the Board of Directors directs the affairs of AmeriCU according to all laws, regulations, requirements and sound business practices.
