= USU Credit Union =

Coordinates: 41°44′06″N 111°50′04″W

USU Credit Union a division of Goldenwest
- Type: Credit union
- Industry: Financial services
- Founded: 1957
- Headquarters: Logan, Utah, Utah, United States
- Area served: Weber County, Utah, Morgan County, Utah, Davis County, Utah, Utah County, Utah, Washington County, Utah, Cache County, Utah, Box Elder County, Utah
- Products: Savings; checking; consumer loans; mortgages; credit cards
- Total assets: $1B USD (2014)
- Number of employees: 390
- Website: usucu.org

USU Credit Union is a division of Goldenwest Credit Union, a federally chartered credit union based in Ogden, Utah, regulated under the authority of the NCUA. As of January 1, 2014, Goldenwest and USU Credit Union serve more than 106,000 members, hold over $1 billion in assets, and operate 26 branches in Utah from Smithfield to St George. It was founded in 1957 by economic professors at Utah State University to provide banking services for university employees and their families.

== History ==
USU Credit Union was founded in the halls of Utah State University (USU) in Logan, UT in 1957 by economic professors Vernon Israelson and Evan Murray. Originally chartered with ten members, the Credit Union was created to provide banking services for USU employees and their families. In the early years, deposits and transactions literally moved from room to room and from drawer to drawer as the professors, who doubled as loan officers and accountants, worked to keep overhead costs low.

In 1962 the credit union hired its first full-time employee, Doris Thorpe. As Director of Marketing, Thorpe tasked her husband (who was an illustrator) to create advertising that was related to rapid growth in the early years of the credit union. In a 10-year span, membership increased from 40% of USU employees to over 83%. Assets grew from around $50,000 in 1957 to over $1.22 million by 1968.

Ground broke in 1975 to begin construction on the Credit Union’s first branch just off USU’s campus. The building was completed in 1978.

The following is an excerpt from USU’s student newspaper, dated April 18, 1978:

Dedication of the new building located at 695 East 10th North, will be Thursday. University President Glen L. Taggart will give the dedicatory address at 4 p.m. Reo L. Williamson, manager-treasurer for the Credit Union explained the new 10,498 square foot building has become a necessity for the rapidly growing union. In 1957 the Credit Union was incorporated with 10 members. Today there are 4,138 members.
“With our rapid growth over the past couple of years we have outgrown the old facility which was owned by the university,” said Williamson...

In 1984, the Credit Union opened its first off-campus branch in the old Macey’s store at the south end of Logan. When Macey’s closed that location in 1992, the Credit Union purchased a new building at 198 North Main. Other new branches followed in Smithfield (2003), Providence (2006) and Brigham City (2007) in northern Utah.

On October 1, 2013, USU Credit Union merged with Goldenwest Credit Union. USU Credit Union retains its name and USU-affiliated brand as a Division of Goldenwest Credit Union.
