= Credit Union of Richmond =

American credit union

Credit Union of Richmond, formerly Richmond Postal Credit Union is the oldest continuously open credit union in the U.S. state of Virginia. In June 2017, the credit union changed its name. The change came due to the need to reach those in the city of Richmond.

Accredited in November 1923, the credit union was started by Richmond area postal workers. Operations began in the basement at the historical Brook Road postal headquarters.

Richmond Postal Credit Union filed an application on September 22, 2004, with the Virginia Bureau of Financial Institutions of the State Corporation Commission to expand its field-of-membership to include the City of Richmond, which qualified as a "Distressed Community/Investment Area" based on Year 2000 U.S. Census Bureau data. The estimated U.S. Census population of Richmond in 2004 was 194,729.

On November 19, 2004, Richmond Postal Credit Union was approved to expand membership to the city of Richmond.
