= PeoplesChoice Credit Union =

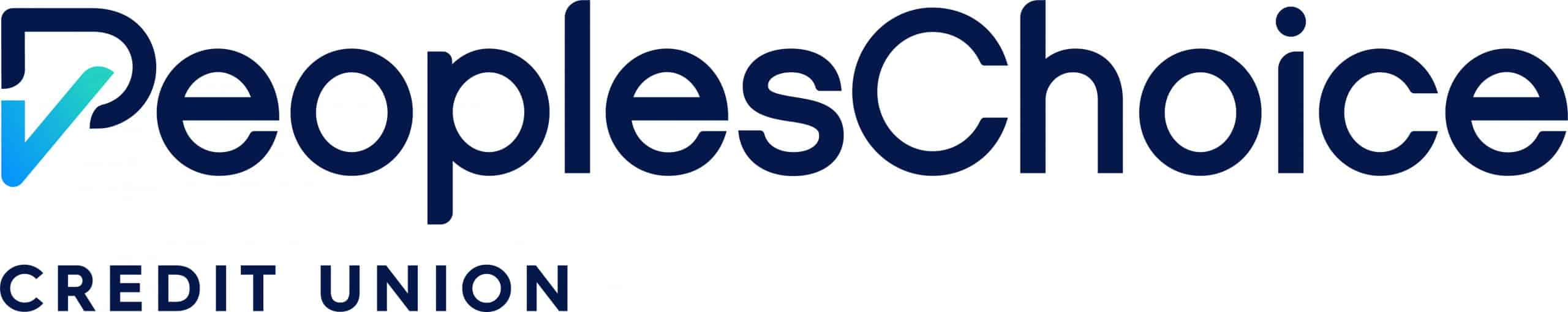
- Type: Credit union
- Industry: Financial services
- Founded: 1963
- Headquarters: Saco, Maine, United States
- Area served: York and Cumberland County
- Key people: Luke Labbe, President
- Products: Savings; checking; consumer loans; mortgages; credit cards
- Total assets: $300M USD
- Number of employees: 60
- Website: peopleschoicecreditunion.com

PeoplesChoice Credit Union is a state-chartered credit union headquartered in Saco, Maine and regulated under the authority of the National Credit Union Administration (NCUA). PeoplesChoice has $300 million in assets, approximately 20,000 members, and 5 branches.

== History ==
St. Joseph's Credit Union was founded in 1963 by a group of parishioners from St. Joseph's Church in Biddeford, Maine. The offices for the credit union were initially located in the church's basement. In 1974, the offices were moved to a building behind the church. St. Joseph's operated there until 1984, when it purchased a building in Biddeford for its first branch office. The credit union merged with the St. Ignatius Federal Credit Union of Sanford, Maine in 1987. The credit union's membership was restricted to parishioners of the St. Ignatius and St. Joseph's churches and some select employee groups until August 2000, when they were granted a county charter from the State of Maine. The charter expanded the credit union's field of membership to anyone who works, lives, or attends school in York County, Maine. Come 2001, Sprague Sanford Federal Credit Union was merged with St. Joseph's. A year later, the credit union opened an office in Wells, Maine.

On February 1, 2006, St. Joseph's changed its name to PeoplesChoice Credit Union. In 2008, PeoplesChoice initiated a series of financial education workshops for the general public covering topics such as budgeting, loans, and mortgages.
