= Akron Post Office and Federal Building =

- U.S. National Register of Historic Places
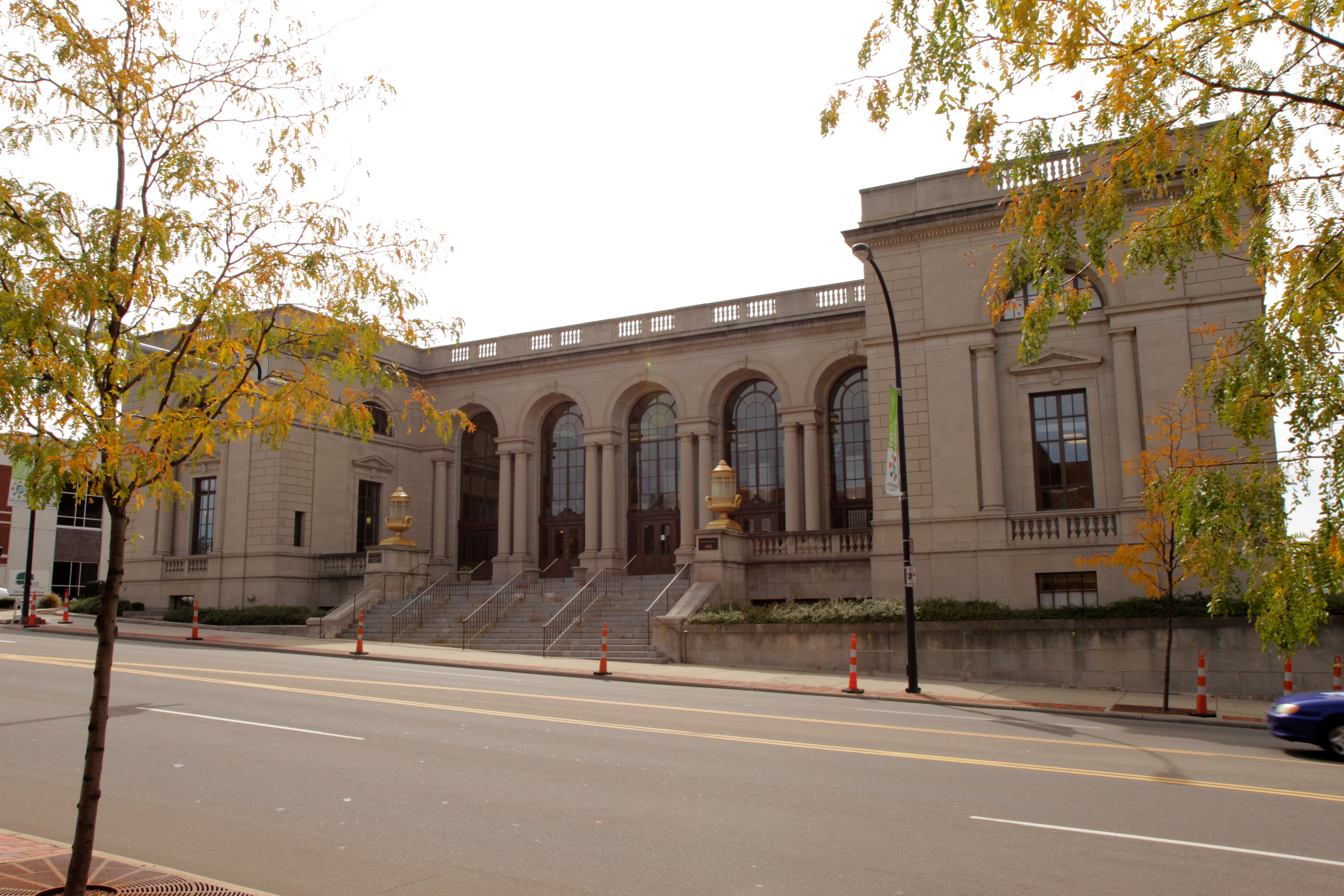
- Akron Post Office and Federal Building

- Location within Ohio
- Location: 165 E. Market St., Akron, Ohio
- Coordinates: 41°5′0.74″N 81°30′44.79″W
- Built: 1927-29
- Architect: Office of the Supervising Architect
- Architectural style: Beaux-Arts architecture
- NRHP reference No.: 83002059
- Added to NRHP: 1983-05-26

Akron Post Office and Federal Building is a historic former post office building in Akron, Ohio. It was listed in the National Register of Historic Places in 1983.

The building was begun in 1927 and completed in 1929 to the designs of US Treasury architects under Acting Supervising Architect James A. Wetmore. The building is an example of Beaux-Arts architecture. It has not been used as a post office since 1975.
