= Robins Financial Credit Union =

Credit union in the United States

- Type: Credit union
- Industry: Financial services
- Founded: 1954; 72 years ago
- Headquarters: Warner Robins, Georgia, United States
- Number of locations: 22
- Area served: Middle Georgia
- Key people: Christina O'Brien (President & CEO)
- Total assets: $4 Billion USD (March 2022)
- Members: 243,000 (March 2022)
- Number of employees: 450
- Subsidiaries: Robins Investment and Retirement Services (RIRS)
- Website: www.robinsfcu.org

Robins Financial Credit Union (or Robins Financial) is a credit union based in Warner Robins, Georgia. Robins Financial is the 2nd largest credit union in the state of Georgia. As of March 31, 2022, Robins Financial has over 243,000 members and over $4 billion in assets. Robins Financial operates 22 branch locations throughout the state of Georgia.

== History ==
Robins Financial Credit Union was originally founded in February 1954 as Robins Federal Credit Union. A group of 13 Robins Air Force Base civilian and military personnel joined to sign the application for a charter for the credit union. The field of membership requested in the original charter included “civilian employees and commissioned officers of the Department of the Air Force who worked at or had headquarters at Robins Air Force Base, Georgia; employees of this credit union; members of their immediate families; and organizations of such persons.” The charter was approved on March 23, 1954, and Robins Federal Credit Union was officially created on April 1, 1954.

In January 2016, Robins Federal Credit Union converted from a Federal Charter to a State of Georgia Charter, becoming Robins Financial Credit Union. Converting to a state charter allowed the credit union to expand their field of membership.

== Membership ==
Robins Financial Credit Union provides financial services to over 243,000 members.

Membership at Robins Financial Credit Union is available to family members of current members as well as those who live or work in the following counties: Baldwin, Barrow, Bibb, Bleckley, Bulloch, Butts, Clarke, Clayton, Crawford, Crisp, DeKalb, Dodge, Dooly, Emanuel, Greene, Gwinnett, Hancock, Henry, Houston, Jackson, Jasper, Jeff Davis, Johnson, Jones, Lamar, Laurens, Macon, Madison, Monroe, Morgan, Newton, Oconee, Oglethorpe, Peach, Pulaski, Putnam, Rockdale, Spalding, Taylor, Telfair, Twiggs, Walton, Washington, Wilcox, Wilkinson.

== Organization ==
Robins Financial Credit Union is a state-chartered credit union and a member of the National Credit Union Administration (NCUA). Like all credit unions, Robins Financial is governed by a Board of Directors, a volunteer group elected by and from its membership. As a member-owned, not-for-profit financial cooperative, each member has an ownership stake in the credit union, rather than shareholders like at a bank. Robins Financial Credit Union operates in accordance with its vision to enhance the financial well-being of their members and community. These values support the credit union's mission to be: Member Focused. Financial Partners. Community Proud.

== Employees ==
As of March 2022, Robins Financial Credit Union had over 450 employees throughout their 22 locations in the state of Georgia.

== Services ==
Robins Financial offers a full range of financial services, including checking and savings accounts, debit cards, credit cards, auto loans, mortgage loans, personal loans, commercial loans, business accounts, share certificates, and Individual Retirement Accounts (IRA). Robins Financial also offers a full suite of digital services through their Digital Banking platform and other online services. Robins Financial Credit Union belongs to a Shared Service Center Network which allows members to conduct transactions at over 5,000 shared branching credit union locations nationwide. Members also have access to a nationwide network of over 85,000 surcharge-free ATMs.

== Charitable Giving ==
Robins Financial Credit Union supports multiple charitable organizations, including local organizations in their community as well as national organizations. Robins Financial has long-standing partnerships with Toys for Tots, Make-A-Wish Georgia, Children's Miracle Network, United Way of Central Georgia, Meals on Wheels, and Habitat for Humanity. Robins Financial also gives back to the military by collecting items for donation each year with Boxes for the Troops, and provides additional support through other donations.

== Awards ==
Robins Financial Credit Union has received the following recent awards and honors:

- 2021 Forbes Best in State Credit Union
- S&P Top Credit Union Award
- United Way of Central Georgia Most Generous Workplace
- 2021 Macon Telegraph Best of the Best Financial Institution
- 2021 Macon Telegraph Best of the Best Mortgage Company
- Raddon Crystal Performance Award for Top 10 Credit Unions above 1 billion in assets
- CUNA Marketing & Business Development Council Diamond Award
- WMGT 41 NBC Viewer's Choice Award Gold Winner for Local Financial Institution
- The Financial Brand Social Media Power 100 Top 100 Credit Unions on Social Media

== In the News ==
Recent news articles featuring Robins Financial Credit Union:

- May 2022, Business Wire - Robins Financial Credit Union Announces Elimination of Non-Sufficient Funds Fees
- April 2022, Credit Union Times - Robins Financial CU Latest to Cross $4 Billion Threshold
- March 2022, Business Wire - Robins Financial Credit Union Announces Agreement to Acquire Persons Banking Company
- March 2022, Credit Union Times - Robins Financial Credit Union Plans to Buy Persons Banking Company
- March 2022, Southeastern CU News - Robins Financial Sponsors Military Scholarships
- January 2022, 13WMAZ - Robins Financial Credit Union Celebrates 100th Anniversary with United Way of Central Georgia
- December 2021, CUInsight - Robins Financial Credit Union distributes over $18 million member rebate
- December 2021, Southeastern CU News - Robins Financial Credit Union Helps Local Students
- November 2021, Fiserv - 2021 Crystal Performance Awards Show Pandemic Resilience Among Credit Unions
- October 2021, Southeastern CU News - City of Warner Robins Proclaims International Credit Union Day
- August 2021, CU Social Good - Robins Financial CU Contributes $200,000 to 16 Community Organizations
- July 2020, American Banker - Robins Financial Credit Union Announces New CEO
- June 2020, 13WMAZ - Robins Financial Credit Union Awards Annual Scholarship
- June 2020, CU Social Good - Robins Financial Credit Union Donates $25,000 for COVID-19 Hunger Relief Efforts
- June 2020, American Banker - Robins Financial Credit Union reaches new asset milestone
- June 2020, CUInsight - Robins Financial Credit Union surpasses $3 billion in assets
- February 2020, 13WMAZ - Houston County adulting course gives students a 'Reality Check'
- December 2015, Macon Telegraph - Warner Robins-based Robins Federal Credit Union to change name in January
