= NASA Federal Credit Union =

American credit union

- Industry: Financial services Credit union
- Founded: 1949
- Headquarters: Upper Marlboro, Maryland
- Number of locations: 13 (5,600 shared branches & 42,000 fee-free ATMs)
- Area served: United States
- Key people: Douglas Allman, President and CEO
- Products: Credit Cards; Savings; Checking; Online Banking; Investments; Auto Loans; Personal Loans
- Members: 250,000
- Website: nasafcu.com

NASA Federal Credit Union is a credit union founded September 29, 1949 and is headquartered in Upper Marlboro, Maryland, United States. It holds more than $5 billion in assets, and is insured by the National Credit Union Administration. The credit union has about 200,000 members, nationwide. It had been named Best-in-State credit union in Maryland in 2018 and 2019 by Forbes.

== History ==
NASA Federal Credit union was founded as the NACA Washington Federal Credit Union in 1949 by a group of employees from the National Advisory Committee for Aeronautics (NACA). As the agency changed its name from NACA to the National Aeronautics and Space Administration (NASA), in 1958, the credit union also changed its name to NASA Washington Federal Credit Union. In 1974, it finalized the name to NASA Federal Credit Union. NASA Federal Credit Union merged with The Partnership Federal Credit Union on October 1, 2019, growing NASA Federal's membership and adding two additional branches, one in Arlington, VA and another in Alexandria, VA.

== Membership ==
In order to join NASA Federal, an applicant must be a NASA employee, relative or retiree, or a member of one of 900 partner companies or associations. Below is a list of associations one can be a part of to become a member of NASA Federal.

- American Association for the Advancement of Science
- American Astronautical Society
- American Geophysical Union
- American Institute of Architects – Washington Chapter (AIADC)
- American Society for Microbiology
- Consumer Electronics Association
- The Mars Society
- Mathematical Association of America
- Moon Society
- National Space Society
- Road Runners Club - Montgomery County, MD - (MCRRC.org)
- Women in Aerospace (WIA)
- The Business Forum for HR Professionals

In addition, ATM fees are waived when members use NASA Federal's 53,000 partner credit unions throughout the U.S.

== Products ==
Credit unions have been mentioned in media outlets about their competitive products, particularly on auto rates, mortgages and CDs as compared to larger banks. NASA Federal has been named in several publications as a recommended credit union to use for a variety of products.

=== Credit cards ===
NASA Federal offers a fixed rate 9.9% balance transfer to those who've opened an account within 90 days. These cards have been mentioned by well-known finance websites such as NerdWallet, who published an article describing the benefits of the credit cards.

=== Auto Loans ===
According to The Wall Street Journal, credit unions are particularly competitive on auto loans, with the average credit-union rates on eight types of auto loans beating the comparable bank figures by an average of two percentage points. NASA Federal currently has a similar promotion that competes to lower an applicant's monthly payment.

=== Certificates ===
NASA Federal has been recognized for its rate-leading high-yield certificates (which are comparable to CDs) in the past by Investopedia, DepositAccounts.com, and Business Insider to name a few.

=== Mortgages ===
NASA Federal offers zero-down mortgages up to $1,149,825 with no private mortgage insurance.

In 2020, NASA Federal originated 1,166 mortgages worth a total of $337 million.

== Community outreach ==
=== Children's Miracle Network ===
Each year, NASA Federal volunteers and participates as runners, raising thousands of dollars for the Children's Miracle Network through an annual event called the Credit Union Cherry Blossom 10 mile run. Nearly 20,000 runners in total participate in this event.

=== Scholarships ===
NASA Federal awards scholarships to DC-area high school students through the Mitchell-Beall-Rosen Memorial Scholarship Contest. The annual program rewards the writing talents of young Credit Union members who are working toward four-year or two-year undergraduate degrees or vocational studies.

The Scholarship Program was established in 1983 in memory of Wilfred Mitchell and then renamed in 1991 to also honor Donald Beall. Both men are former NASA Federal Credit Union officials. Eugene Rosen joined NASA Federal Credit Union in 1961, was elected to the Board in 1962, and served as Treasurer since 1963. Among the many accomplishments for which Mr. Rosen will be remembered is his service to the Mitchell-Beall Memorial Scholarship program, where his name was added in recognition in 2010.
