= First Citizens' Federal Credit Union =

US financial institution

First Citizens’ Federal Credit Union
- Company type: Credit union
- Industry: Financial services
- Founded: 1937
- Headquarters: Fairhaven, Massachusetts, United States
- Number of locations: 9 full-service branches and an Administrative Center
- Key people: Peter J. Muise, CEO; Edward P. Shea, COO
- Products: Savings; Checking; Consumer loans; IRA’s; Mortgages; Business loans; home equity loans
- Website: firstcitizens.org

First Citizens' Federal Credit Union is a federally chartered credit union headquartered in Fairhaven, Massachusetts in the AT&T Building on Mill Road.

== History ==
First Citizens' Federal Credit Union was originally organized as Bristol Credit Union on November 17, 1937, as a state chartered community credit union serving employees and/or residents of Bristol County, Massachusetts. The name was changed to Citizens' Credit Union during a charter expansion that extended the credit union's allowed field of membership to include the Massachusetts counties of Bristol, Plymouth, Barnstable, Dukes, Nantucket and Norfolk. In 1987, the credit union's state charter was converted to a federal charter. At the same time, the credit union deposits became federally insured. A new name was chosen, First Citizens' Federal Credit Union, which remains today.

== Locations and branches ==
In 1998, the seventh branch office opened for business in Falmouth. 2010 marked the opening of the Mattapoisett branch location. The credit union currently has nine branch locations and continues to grow both in size. Plans have been put into place to expand again in 2011, adding additional branches on Cape Cod. In 2011, the Mashpee branch of First Citizens opened. First Citizens' is currently a $500 million plus institution.

Branch Locations

- Fairhaven, Massachusetts
- New Bedford, Massachusetts (Downtown, North & South)
- Mattapoisett, Massachusetts
- Taunton, Massachusetts
- Raynham, Massachusetts
- Falmouth, Massachusetts
- Mashpee, Massachusetts
- Hyannis, Massachusetts
- Orleans, Massachusetts
- Wareham, Massachusetts

== Services ==
First Citizens’ offers their customers auto loans, mortgages, home equity loans, small business financing, checking, savings, and personal loans.

== Social responsibility ==
First Citizens’ provides annual college scholarships throughout the areas they serve each year.

First Citizens’ supports local veteran service organizations through their 'Hero Program'. In 2009, the credit union introduced a similar program called the "Champion Program" that is aimed at recognizing those who serve their communities. 2009 also marked the beginning of their “Think Community” program which helps out local 501(c)3 non-profit organizations. This program features these non-profits on their Facebook page, their website and even highlights one of these organizations in their e-newsletter each month.
