= Beulah Federal Credit Union =

Beulah Federal Credit Union is a faith based financial institution that is owned and operated by the Beulah Church of the Nazarene in Brooklyn, New York. It received its charter from the National Credit Union Administration (NCUA) on October 19, 2007, with the mission to serve the church's 933 members. It also received NCUA low-income designation, which enables it to accept deposits from non-members and to qualify for loans and technical assistance through the NCUA Community Development Revolving Loan Fund Program.

In creating the credit union, the church leadership noted it would focus primarily on financial counseling, savings programs and loans.

In its first six months of operation, the credit union accumulated US$11,874 in assets. Its chairperson is Pamela Mayers-Miller and its CEO is Vernon Reid.
