= Apple Federal Credit Union =

Credit union in the United States

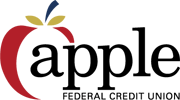
- Company type: Credit union
- Industry: Financial services
- Founded: 1 October 1956; 69 years ago
- Headquarters: Fairfax, Virginia, United States
- Number of locations: 21
- Area served: Northern Virginia
- Key people: Andy Grimm (President & CEO)
- Products: Savings; checking; consumer loans; mortgages; credit cards; investments; online banking
- Total assets: $4,619,212,792 United States dollars (1Q 2025)
- Members: 252,683 (1Q 2025)
- Number of employees: 542
- Subsidiaries: Apple Financial Services (CUSO)
- Website: https://www.AppleFCU.org

The Apple Federal Credit Union (also known as Apple FCU) is a U.S. credit union founded in 1956 and headquartered in Fairfax, Virginia, chartered and regulated under the authority of the National Credit Union Administration (NCUA). As of September 2023, Apple FCU had more than 240,000 members and over $4 billion USD in assets, making it larger than over 90% of federal credit unions in the United States.

== Organization and employees ==
Apple FCU is chartered with the NCUA, and like other credit unions, is governed by a volunteer board of directors, elected by and from its membership. Apple FCU also has a separate wholly owned subsidiary providing wealth management and insurance named Apple Financial Services, LLC.

As of January 2024, the credit union had nearly 530 combined employees working at its headquarters and branches. It was listed as one of the "Top Workplaces" in 2023 by the Washington Post. It also claimed the number one spot in Virginia in 2018 for Forbes’ "Best-In-State Credit Unions" survey of 25,000 consumers.

== Mergers and acquisitions ==
Apple FCU has expanded its field of operations beyond its original common bond charter several times through the absorption of other credit unions. In 2011, a Prince William County community charter was added through a merger with Synergy One Federal Credit Union (Manassas, VA). In 2013, a merger with Vantria Federal Credit Union (Springfield, VA) added a community charter to include all Fairfax County. In 2015, Apple FCU acquired a Frederick County (VA) community charter when Winchester Community Federal Credit Union "was merged into Apple at the request of the NCUA after the federal agency placed Winchester Community into 'restricted status' " because the CEO of Winchester Community Federal Credit Union, Donna L. Jennings, had pleaded guilty to stealing more than $1 million from the organization she led.

== 2018 class action lawsuit ==
In August 2018, plaintiff Jamie Liggio sued Apple Federal Credit Union for charging excessive overdraft fees. The case was settled in December 2019 with Apple FCU agreeing to pay members up to $2,700,000.
