= Fort Liberty Federal Credit Union =

Credit union in North Carolina, US

Fort Bragg Federal Credit Union
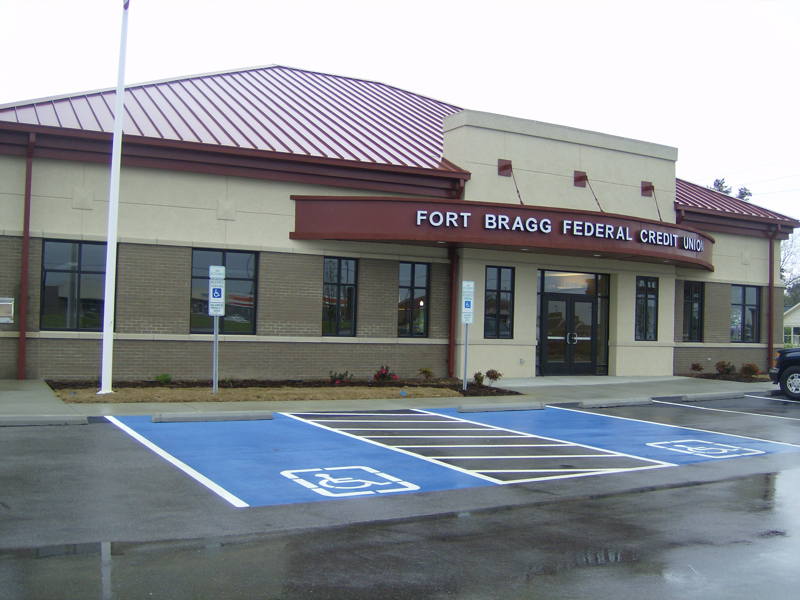
- Fort Bragg Federal Credit Union
- Type: Credit union
- Industry: Financial services
- Founded: April 18, 1960; 66 years ago
- Founder: Eight individuals on US Army base Fort Bragg
- Headquarters: Fort Bragg, North Carolina, United States
- Products: Banking and investments
- Owners: Its members
- Website: myfortlibertyfcu.org

Fort Bragg Federal Credit Union (FBFCU; previously Fort Liberty Federal Credit Union) is an American not-for-profit federal credit union owned exclusively by its members and regulated by the National Credit Union Administration (NCUA).

It was chartered on April 18, 1960, by eight individuals on Fort Bragg, a U.S. Army base, and was originally intended for military members only. Originally started with one location on Fort Bragg, it has since expanded to five locations, including three in the city of Fayetteville, North Carolina.

== History ==
- April 18, 1960 - FBFCU is chartered in Fort Bragg, North Carolina. Membership included serving active duty military assigned to Fort Bragg, military retirees, and their family members.
- January 1961 - The Credit Union held its first annual meeting with only 28 members present.
- April 1975 - FBFCU opened an official branch on Bastogne Drive on the Fort Bragg military installation.
- February 1986 - FBFCU opened a second branch on Skibo Road in the City of Fayetteville, North Carolina.
- July 20, 1989 – Re-Grand Opening of the Bastogne Branch after renovations.
- July 1998 - Surpassed $100 million in assets and completed renovations to the Skibo Road Branch.
- February 2002 - A third branch was opened on Fort Bragg at the Hefner Plaza, now the South Post exchange.
- September 5, 2003 - FBFCU amended its charter to include Fort Bragg employees and persons who regularly work on Fort Bragg.
- April 13, 2005 - The charter was amended again to include members of the Braxton Bragg Chapter of the Association of the United States Army.
- June 2006 - A fourth branch is opened on Ramsey Street in Fayetteville, North Carolina.
- April 2008 - The fifth and final branch is opened on Raeford Road in Fayetteville, North Carolina.
- March 2012 – The Credit Union charter was amended again to include persons who live, work, worship, or attend school in, and businesses and other legal entities located in Cumberland County, North Carolina.

== Notices ==
In 1995, Fort Bragg Federal Credit Union held a special fund for donations towards the children of Maj. Stephen Badger who was killed by a sniper on Fort Bragg in 1995.

In April 2006, as an alternative to payday lenders, Fort Bragg Federal Credit Union and State Employees Credit Union were featured in a 2006 news article for offering short-term loans between paychecks.

In June 2006, as another alternative to payday lenders, FBFCU began offering the Asset Recovery Kit (ARK) loan to soldiers in desperate needs of finances.

In 2007, the Credit Union began offering free identity theft protection for members.

FBFCU made headlines in 2015 with a social media scavenger hunt that gave away thousands of dollars in prizes and drew national media attention.
