= PrimeWay Federal Credit Union =

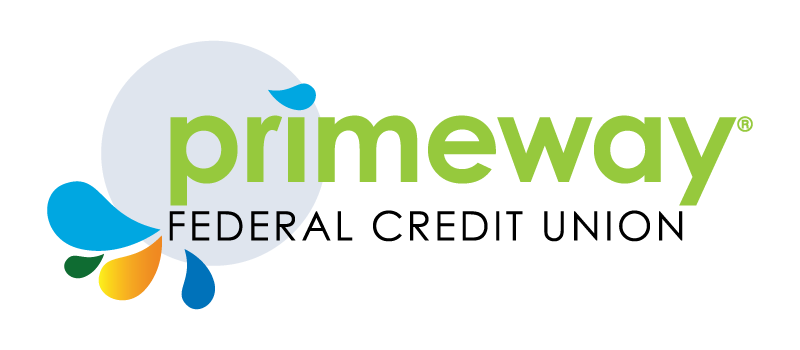
- Company type: Credit union
- Industry: Financial services
- Predecessor: Houston Telephone Federal Credit Union
- Founded: 1937; 89 years ago
- Headquarters: Houston, Texas, United States
- Number of locations: 6 branches
- Services: Auto Loans, Business Loans, Checking, Consumer Loans, Credit Cards, Direct Deposit, Financial Planning, Home Equity Loans, Investments, Mortgage Loans, Online Banking, Overdraft Protection, Personal and Business Account Services, Savings, Secured Loans, Personal Loans
- Website: www.primewayfcu.com

PrimeWay Federal Credit Union is an American credit union based in Houston, Texas. It is federally insured, federally chartered, and member-owned, not-for-profit financial cooperative.

As of 2020, PrimeWay Federal Credit Union served over 48,000 members and managed assets of more than $655 million. PrimeWay Federal Credit Union operates 8 locations in the Houston area .

PrimeWay Federal Credit Union is insured by the National Credit Union Administration (NCUA), is an Equal Housing Lender and a member of the Better Business Bureau.

== History ==
The credit union was organized in April 1937 as Houston Telephone Federal Credit Union to serve the employees of Southwestern Bell in the Houston area. In April 2003, the name was officially changed to PrimeWay Federal Credit Union. The name change was prompted by credit union growth and diversification of membership.

In 2004, PrimeWay Federal Credit Union was granted a community charter under the National Credit Union Administration (NCUA).

== Community Involvement ==
=== Educator and Student Scholarships ===
Each year, PrimeWay Federal Credit Union awards $10,500 in scholarship money to deserving students who have excelled in the classroom. PrimeWay offers a $1,500 Student Scholarship to a PrimeWay Student Account member applicant. In addition, four additional scholarships are awarded to exceptional students in Houston, Harris, Fort Bend or Washington County: 1) One student is awarded the Dale Roberts scholarship worth $2,500 2) One student is awarded the Luker Leadership scholarship worth $2500 3) One student is awarded the PrimeWay Foundation Community scholarship worth $2,500 and 4) One student is award the PrimeWay Art scholarship worth $1,500. To learn more, visit https://www.primewayfcu.com/youth-banking-accounts/student-scholarships.

=== PrimeWay Foundation ===
The PrimeWay Foundation provides scholarships and grants to 501(c)(3) organizations that provide resources to improve health and education. Founded in November 2019, the PrimeWay Foundation places a priority on those organizations that help provide for children and preparing them for their future. To learn more, visit primewayfoundation.org.

=== The Houston SPCA ===
In 2013, PrimeWay Federal Credit Union teamed up with The Houston SPCA to help give orphaned, abused and neglected animals a second chance at life. To further promote the cause, PrimeWay donated over $2,500 to help with the organization’s mission of freeing animals from suffering, abuse and exploitation. PrimeWay also paid the adoption fee for each animal that was adopted during the Adoption Day.

== See also ==
- History of credit unions
