= Lafayette Federal Credit Union =

Credit union headquartered in Rockville, Maryland, US

- Type: Credit union
- Industry: Financial services
- Founded: 1935
- Headquarters: Rockville, Maryland, United States
- Number of locations: 10 (5 in Maryland, 3 in Virginia, 2 in the District of Columbia)
- Key people: B. John Farmakides, President/CEO; Nathan (Gus) Siekierka, Chairman
- Products: Savings; checking; consumer loans; mortgages; credit cards; online banking
- Total assets: $2.14B USD (February 2026)
- Website: https://www.lfcu.org/

Lafayette Federal Credit Union (Lafayette Federal), is a credit union headquartered at the Norman Cohen Financial Service Center in Rockville, Maryland, chartered and regulated under the authority of the National Credit Union Administration (NCUA) of the U.S. Federal government. As of February 2026, Lafayette Federal had over US$2.14 billion in assets, and over 56,800 members.

== History ==
On October 3, 1935, 1825 H Street Federal Credit Union was established and officially opened its doors in the heart of Washington, DC. The credit union was created to serve the employees of the Reconstruction Finance Corporation, the RFC Mortgage Company and the Commodity Credit Corporation. For the first few years, personal loans up to $50 (or $1,000 at today’s value) were the sole product offering. By 1939, the maximum limit on the loans was increased to $100 (or $2,000 at today’s value), and vehicle loans were also added as a second loan type.

In 1940, the credit union moved across town in Washington, DC, from its original H Street location to the Lafayette Building on Vermont Avenue in Northwest, and officially changed its name to Lafayette Federal Credit Union. During the 1940s, Lafayette Federal expanded its products and services to include share accounts and U.S. Savings Bonds. Staffing increased to six employees (five full-time and one part-time).

By the early 1950s, Lafayette Federal had reached 960 members, $129,000 in total loans outstanding, and assets of nearly $500,000. Additionally, the Small Business Administration was added to the field of membership.

Lafayette Federal experienced further growth during the 1960-70s time period. The credit union moved its headquarter location to the U.S. Department of State Building and added the U.S. Peace Corps as yet another organization within its field of membership. By 1970, the National Credit Union Administration was formed as the official entity to supervise and regulate credit unions. As a result of this, the “once a member, always a member” policy is adopted. By 1974, Lafayette Federal reached $10 million in assets and had 7,600 members.

The 1980s led to the launch of several new products and services to the credit union. Share draft, certificate, and IRA accounts, as well as first trust mortgage and home equity loans, were rolled out to the membership. Additionally, Lafayette Federal began offering ATM cards, paving the way for increased accessibility. In 1989, the credit union moved its headquarter location to a larger location in Kensington, Maryland.

In 1992, Lafayette Federal completed its first merger with Potomac Community Federal Credit Union. Following this, the credit union made major technological strides with the rollout of several new electronic services, including: telephone bill pay system, 24-hour telephone loan application service, access debit card, online banking system and the inaugural website. Lafayette Federal was one of the first financial institutions in the market to offer online banking services to its membership.

The early 2000s brought about the start of several new partnerships. Lafayette Federal teamed up with other credit unions to form Potomac Business Services, LLC in order to provide commercial loans to growing businesses. A couple of years later, commercial accounts and relationship checking accounts are introduced, offering more deposit options for both consumers and businesses. In 2008, Lafayette Federal hosts its very first Capitol Classic Charity Golf Tournament, thus commencing an annual charity event for the credit union.

In 2010, the credit union celebrated its 75 year anniversary. Over the next two years, membership eligibility is once again expanded with through the addition of the American Consumer Council (ACC). Through this organization, all residents of Washington, DC, Maryland, and Virginia are eligible to join. In 2016, Lafayette Federal completed its second merger with CSC Employees Federal Credit Union (still operating as Lafayette Federal Credit Union). The following year, the credit union moved its headquarters to Rockville, MD, and opened a branch on the premises a year later.

As a result of the COVID-19 pandemic, 2020 was a landmark year worldwide. Lafayette Federal was able to shift gears to accommodate the new landscape. During this time, Lafayette Federal was able to maintain operations and continued to experience membership and loan growth. Following the credit union philosophy of “people helping people”, the credit union launched several initiatives aimed at aiding those at the frontline of the pandemic. With its Fuel the Frontline initiative, Lafayette Federal donated 1,755 meals to first responders and $850 in gift cards to Fox 5 DC's Hometown Heroes during the pandemic. Their performance was recognized by S&P Global by ranking #20 in their Top 100 Performing Credit Unions of 2020 Report. One year later, the credit union once again received national recognition as one of Newsweek’s America’s Best Banks for 2022. By March 31, 2021, Lafayette Federal reached a milestone $1 billion in assets. Later that year, the credit union raised an impressive $65,000 for Children's Miracle Network Hospitals, totaling $1 million in charitable donations over the lifetime of the organization's fundraising efforts.

In 2023, Lafayette Federal relocated its McLean Financial Service Center from 6701 Lowell Avenue, McLean, VA 22101, to a new, renovated building at 6890 Elm Street, McLean, VA 22101. A grand opening celebration was hosted on Wednesday, October 11, 2023 to commemorate the new branch opening.

In 2024, Lafayette Federal Credit Union continued its expansion by opening the Greenbelt Financial Service Center, located at 7537 Greenbelt Road, Greenbelt, MD 20770. The grand opening celebration was held on Wednesday, July 10, 2024. The following year, in 2025, Lafayette Federal celebrated its 90th anniversary and further expanded its presence by opening the Fallsgrove Financial Service Center at 14933-A Shady Grove Road, Rockville, MD 20850. The grand opening for this location took place on Wednesday, March 12, 2025. The Great Falls Financial Service Center, located at 9904 Georgetown Pike, Great Falls, VA 22066, opened on March 23, 2026. Lafayette Federal moved their Columbia Heights Financial Service Center to 3306 14th St NW, Washington, D.C. 20010 in early September 2026, and hosted a grand opening ceremony on Tuesday, October 6, 2026. Hal Hershfelt of the Washington Spirit attended the opening as a special guest.

Older logo of Lafayette Federal Credit Union, utilizing a script style font.

== Membership ==
Lafayette Federal's field of membership is set by the National Credit Union Administration (NCUA). As with all credit unions, membership at Lafayette Federal is limited to individuals sharing the common bond defined within its credit union charter. All residents of Washington, D.C., Maryland and Virginia are added to Lafayette Federal's field of membership through the American Consumer Council (ACC).

Once a Member‚ Always a Member policy

Lafayette Federal Credit Union operates under a "once a member, always a member" policy. Regardless of the way members originally obtain eligibility, once they become a member they are able to retain their membership in the credit union as long as a minimum balance of $50 is held in a Share Savings account.

Residents of Potomac, MD

Persons who live or work in that part of Montgomery County, Maryland, known as Potomac, bounded on the south by the Potomac River from Riley's Lock Road on the west to Cabin John Parkway on the east, on the east by Cabin John Parkway to the Capital Beltway 495 to Interstate 270, on the north by Shady Grove Road to State Route 28 to State Route 112, and on the west by State Route 112 and Seneca Road to River Road to Riley's Lock Road to the Potomac River are eligible. However, the military reservation known as the U. S. Navy Ship Research and Development Center is excluded from this field of membership.

Select Washington, D.C. residents

Many individuals who live, work, worship or attend school in Washington, D.C. are eligible to become members. However, the D.C. charter only extends to individuals within certain geographic boundaries.

Select employee groups

Membership is extended to all direct-hire individuals employed by or retired from the authorized list of employers throughout the United States. Lafayette Federal Credit Union's official website provides a complete list of these selected organizations.

Eligibility through a family member

Eligibility is extended to immediate family of current Lafayette Federal members.

Eligibility through the Home Ownership Financial Literacy Council

Eligibility is extended to all members of the Home Ownership Financial Literacy Council. With a one-time fee membership fee of just $10, applicants gain access to comprehensive home ownership and financial educational tools, as well as eligibility to become a member of Lafayette Federal.

== Services ==
Lafayette Federal Credit Union offers an array of services, including:

- No-fee checking
- Mastercard debit cards
- Extensive network of surcharge-free ATMs nationwide
- 6,000+ shared branches nationwide
- No-annual-fee credit cards
- Free online banking
- Online Bill Pay
- Online and telephone access
- Savings accounts
- Fixed and variable-rate certificates
- Preferred/premier savings accounts
- Money market accounts
- Investment services
- Individual retirement accounts (IRA)

- First trust mortgages
- Home equity loans
- Construction-to-permanent loans
- Bridge loans
- Commercial real estate financing
- Overdraft lines of credit
- New and used auto loans
- Classic car and restoration loans
- RV, boat and motorcycle loans
- Personal loans
- Electronic funds transfer
- Credit life and disability insurance
- GAP insurance

== Lafayette Private Wealth ==
Lafayette Federal opened an wealth management and financial advisory services subsidiary, Lafayette Private Wealth, in 2025 in collaboration with Raymond James. The subsidiary currently operates out of two locations, the main location at Lafayette Federal's headquarters in Rockville, Maryland, and a second, appointment only location in Mount Airy, Maryland, which opened in September 2026.

== Management team ==
Mr. B. John Farmakides is the president/CEO of Lafayette Federal Credit Union. Mr. Farmakides has been an active member of the Lafayette Federal community since 1994. He joined the supervisory committee in 1998, and later served as its chairman. In 2006, he was elected to the board of directors and was subsequently nominated to and assumed the position of treasurer. Mr. Farmakides was named president and CEO in 2007. Prior to that, he worked in investment banking, commercial real estate, and the Federal government.

Currently, Mr. Farmakides holds positions on many professional boards and committees including: vice-chairman of Potomac Business Services LLC, director of the board for Preferred Business Xchange, LLC, and serves on the Regulatory Committee of the National Association of Federal Credit Unions.

Mr. Farmakides is assisted by the senior management team at Lafayette Federal Credit Union, which is composed of:

- Stephen Harrell, Chief Financial Officer
- Andrew Polott, Chief Legal Officer
- Jeff Ference, Senior Vice President, Chief Operating Officer
- Gladys Magsino, Senior Vice President, Chief Administrative Officer
- Lynn English, Senior Vice President, Risk Management
- John Gagliardi Sr., Senior Vice President, Wealth Management
- Isabel Gomez, Senior Vice President, Finance and Accounting
- Varun Gupta‚ Senior Vice President, Business Development
- Andrew Mason‚ Senior Vice President, Information Technology
- Ali Nassirian, Senior Vice President, Secondary Sales & Lending Solutions
- Anthony Pica, Senior Vice President, Business Banking
- Katherine Purdy, Senior Vice President, Marketing
- Roland Varblow‚ Senior Vice President, Mortgage Lending
- Tina Werking‚ Senior Vice President, Lending

Lafayette Federal is governed by a board of volunteers, elected by and from its membership.

== Sports Partnerships ==
Lafayette Federal Credit Union became the Official Credit Union of Major League Soccer soccer team D.C. United and National Women's Soccer League soccer team Washington Spirit in early 2026. The D.C. United partnership was announced on February 24, 2026, while Washington Spirit was announced on April 8, 2026.
