= TruChoice Federal Credit Union =

American credit union in Maine

- Company type: Credit union
- Industry: Financial services
- Founded: January 12, 1955 (71 years ago)
- Headquarters: Portland, Maine, United States
- Number of locations: 5 branch offices
- Key people: Kenneth Acker
- Products: Savings; Checking; Consumer loans; Mortgages; Credit cards; Investments
- Total assets: $119M USD (2017)
- Number of employees: 50 (2017)
- Website: www.trufcu.com

TruChoice Federal Credit Union (TRUFCU) is an American credit union based in Portland, Maine. It serves members in York and Cumberland counties, Maine.

As of 2017, it had 12,066 members and approximately $119.37 million in assets.

== History ==
It was founded on January 12, 1955 as the Maine Medical Center Credit Union.

On July 31, 2017, the credit union opened a branch in Biddeford, Maine. In August 2017, TRUFCU was named one of the best places to work in Maine by the Maine State Council of the Society for Human Resources Management.
