= Global Credit Union =

Credit union headquartered in Anchorage, Alaska

Global Federal Credit Union
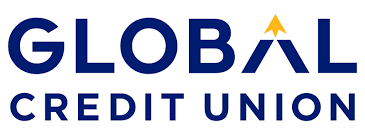
- Company type: Credit Union
- Industry: Financial services
- Founded: 1948; 78 years ago
- Headquarters: Anchorage, Alaska, United States
- Area served: Alaska; Washington; Maricopa County, Arizona; High Desert, California; Northwest Idaho
- Key people: Geoff Lundfelt, President; Bobby Alexander, Chairman
- Products: Checking and savings, consumer loans, credit cards, commercial products, personal insurance, mortgage and real estate, financial planning and investment services
- Total assets: US$12.876B (2026)
- Subsidiaries: Global Credit Union Insurance Brokers, Global Credit Union Home Loans, Procure Mortgage Company; Global Credit Union Foundation
- Website: www.globalcu.org

Global Federal Credit Union is a credit union headquartered in Anchorage, Alaska, chartered and regulated under the authority of the National Credit Union Administration (NCUA). In the United States, Global is among the largest credit unions by assets, and it is among the 20 largest credit unions by membership.

Global is a federally chartered, member-owned, not-for-profit financial cooperative with more than 100 branch offices and service locations throughout Alaska, Arizona's Maricopa County, California's San Bernardino County, Washington State, and Idaho's Kootenai County. As of March 2026, Global had $12.876 billion in assets and more than 790,000 members.

The credit union also owns and operates Global Credit Union Insurance Brokers (formally Alaska USA Insurance Brokers) in Alaska, Washington, and Arizona, and Global Credit Union Home Loans (formally Alaska USA Mortgage Company) in Alaska, California, and Washington.

On September 16, 2003, Global established the Global Credit Union Foundation to support 501(c)(3) organizations that provide non-discriminatory, needs-based services to children and veterans of the armed services. On June 4, 2009, Global Credit Union Foundation amended its articles of incorporation to provide support to any 501(c)(3) organization.

== History ==
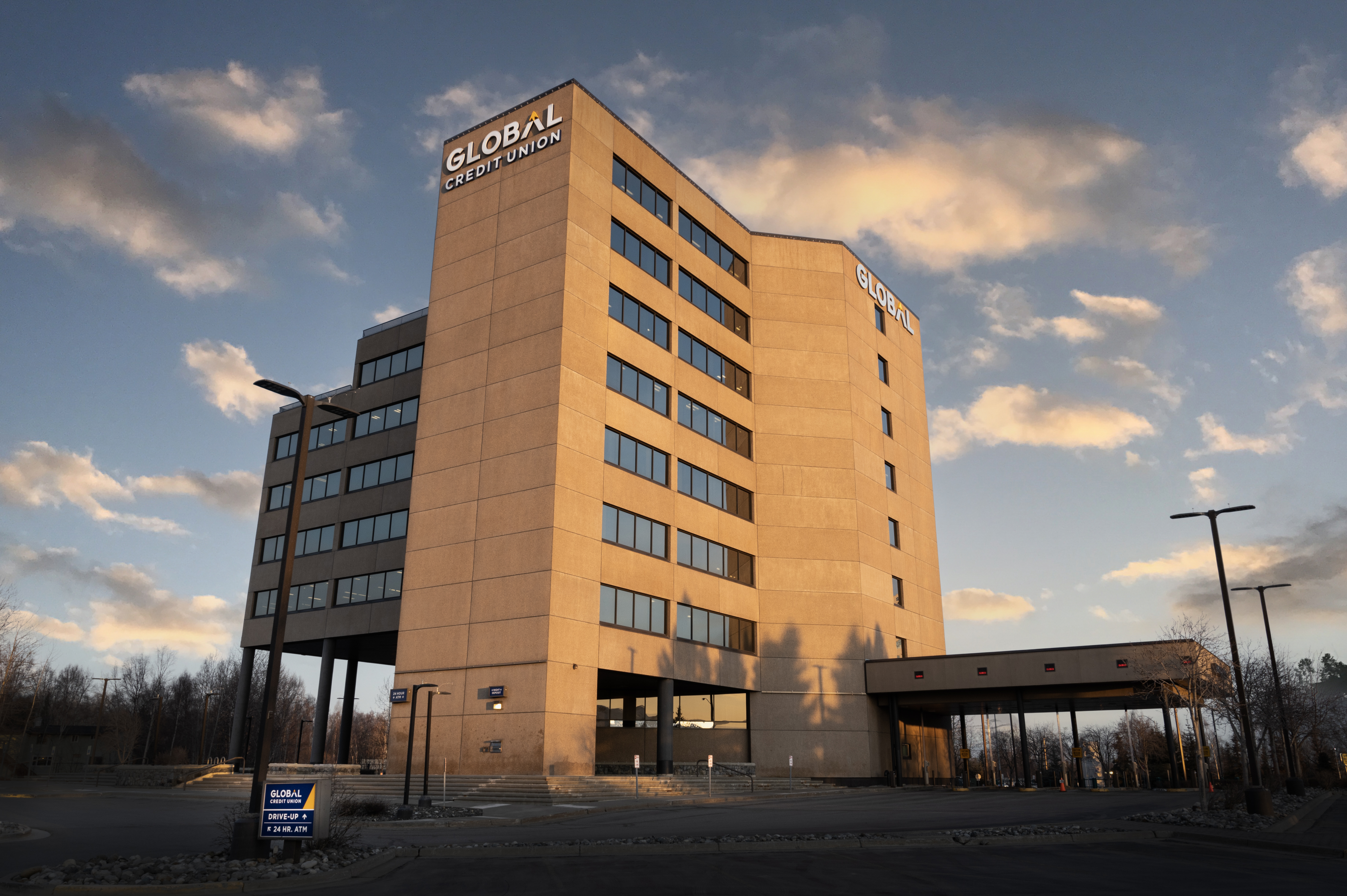
Headquarters building in Anchorage, Alaska.

Global Credit Union was founded in 1948 by 15 volunteers and originally chartered as the Alaskan Air Depot Federal Credit Union to provide financial services to military personnel and federal employees stationed in pre-statehood Alaska.

By 1974, the credit union's membership grew to include more than 20,000 workers of the services companies of the Trans-Alaska Pipeline System. During this same period, Global Credit Union received congressional authority to provide services to 10 of the Alaska Native Regional Corporations under the Alaska Native Claims Settlement Act.

The credit union entered the Pacific Northwest market in 1983 by merging with Whidbey Federal Credit Union in Oak Harbor. Global gained a statewide community charter in Washington following the merger of two other Seattle-based credit unions in 2010.

Global Credit Union expanded into California's San Bernardino County in 2009 by acquiring the High Desert Federal Credit Union of Apple Valley, California, and the Members Own Federal Credit Union of Victorville, California. This growth continued with the acquisition of Arrowhead Credit Union in 2010, and their branches in Barstow, Victorville, Big Bear, and Hesperia, California.

In 2014, Global Credit Union opened its first Arizona branch in Glendale. In 2015, the credit union was granted authorization by the NCUA to qualify members in underserved areas in Maricopa County.

In 2020, the credit union acquired 7 branches in Arizona from TCF Financial Corporation. On April 11, 2024, Global Credit Union acquired assets and liabilities of First Financial Northwest bank.
