= Cornerstone Credit Union League =

The Cornerstone Credit Union League (now Cornerstone) is a not-for-profit credit union league that publicly represents nearly 800 credit unions across Arkansas, Kansas, Missouri,Oklahoma, and Texas. It communicates with and educates the general public on credit unions as a safe and secure financial institution, provides professional development to practitioners in the industry and advocates for the credit unions on a state and federal legislative and regulatory level. More than 8.4 million members in turn own these credit unions, with Cornerstone's service corporation providing industry assistance and tools (such as financially related products and services, education and assistance grants, marketing communication resources, educational and training options, and more) to help spread their presence as full-service financial institutions.

== History ==
The original Texas Credit Union League was incorporated on October 6, 1934, in the Hotel Texas in Fort Worth, now the Hilton Fort Worth.
