= Service Credit Union =

American credit union

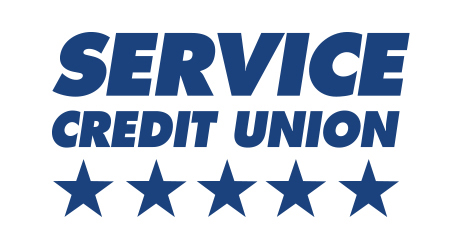
- Type: Credit union
- Industry: Financial services
- Founded: 1957
- Headquarters: Portsmouth, New Hampshire, United States
- Number of locations: 52 Branches (2025)
- Area served: Worldwide
- Key people: David Araujo (President/CEO)
- Products: Checking; Savings; Credit Cards; Consumer Loans; Investments; Mortgages; Online Banking
- Total assets: ▲US$5.473B (Q4 2023)
- Members: 380,000+
- Number of employees: 1,000+
- Website: servicecu.org

Service Federal Credit Union (Service Credit Union) is the largest credit union in New England, and is chartered and regulated by the National Credit Union Administration (NCUA). As of Q4 2023, Service Credit Union has over US$5.4 billion in assets, and more than 354,000 members worldwide. Service Credit Union operates 38 branches in New Hampshire, Massachusetts, and North Dakota; and 14 branches serving American military personnel stationed in Germany.

Service Credit Union offers deposit accounts, including checking, savings, and money market; and lending products, including auto loans and credit cards.

== History ==
Service Credit Union was founded in 1957 as Portsmouth Air Force Base Credit Union. The credit union opened its doors to serve airmen and their families at Pease Air National Guard Base.

== Membership ==
Service Credit Union's field of membership includes:

- Active duty military, veterans, and their families
- Anyone who currently works (or worked) for the Department of Defense (DoD), as well as their families
- Members of Select Employee Groups (SEGs)
- Members of the American Consumer Council (ACC)

== Products and Services ==
Service Credit Union offers a suite of financial products, including savings accounts, checking accounts, credit cards, and loans. The "Primary Savings" account with an initial deposit of US$5.00 establishes a share of ownership in the credit union. The "Everyday Checking" account is free, has no minimum balance, and ATM fees are refunded for the Direct Deposit and Direct Deposit+ checking account tier.

== Locations ==
As of 2019, Service Credit Union has 52 locations (35 in New Hampshire, 2 in Massachusetts, 1 in North Dakota, and 14 on US military installations throughout Germany). The credit union participates in the CO-OP Shared Branch, providing members access to their accounts at more than 6,000 branches throughout the United States.

== Awards ==
Service Credit Union has received the following awards and recognitions:

- Best Credit Union for Military Individuals & Families by Investopedia
- One of the best banks and credit unions for military members and their families by Business Insider
