= Caltech Employees Federal Credit Union =

American credit union

Caltech Federal Credit Union
- Type: Credit Union
- Industry: Financial services
- Founded: April 11, 1950; 76 years ago
- Headquarters: La Cañada, California, United States
- Area served: La Cañada Flintridge, California
- Key people: John Meeker (President and CEO), Steve Proia (Chair, Board of Directors)
- Services: Banking, credit, and loans
- Total assets: ▲US$2 billion (2020)
- Members: 37,000
- Website: www.cefcu.org

Caltech Employees Federal Credit Union (CEFCU) is a credit union for the California Institute of Technology family and its affiliate organizations. CEFCU is headquartered in La Cañada Flintridge and is the 36th largest credit union in the state of California. It is also the 245th largest credit union in the nation. Caltech Employees Federal Credit Union's savings rates are six times the national average.

CEFCU membership is available to the Caltech community and members of their immediate families. The credit union makes personal loans at interest rates that usually exceed the interest rates available on short-term accounts at banks or savings institutions.

== History ==
Caltech Employees Federal Credit Union was established on 11 April 1950 by seven employees of the California Institute of Technology. At present, it has over 37,000 members with assets over $2 billion. The services offered by CEFCU are share savings accounts, youth savings accounts, real estate and vehicle loans, personal loans, credit card services and others.

In 2016, the company announced their new Real Estate Loan Center. The office of the loan center is located at the corner of Foothill Boulevard and Commonwealth Avenue in La Cañada Flintridge.

== Leadership ==
John Meeker assumed the role of president and chief executive officer on April 2, 2024. John served as CEFCU's senior vice president and chief financial officer since 1999. As a key member of CEFCU's executive management team, John has significantly contributed to defining the strategic goals and initiatives that maintain the Credit Union's tradition of stability, security, and trust.

After a 38-year tenure at CEFCU, president and CEO Rich L. Harris retired on April 1, 2024. In 2010, he was elected to serve as a board member at the National Association of Federal Credit Unions (NAFCU). He was elected as NAFCU's board chairman on 15 June 2016.

The present chair of the board of directors of CEFCU is Steve Proia. Steve has been a board member since 1998, previously serving as chair of the board in 2001-2002 and 2010–2011. He retired from the Jet Propulsion Laboratory in 2016, where he held the positions of chief financial officer and director for business operations.

== Services ==
Caltech Employees Federal Credit Union offers its services nationwide with surcharge-free access to 30,000 ATMs of CO-OP Network. CEFCU also offers online access with eBranch. Its mobile app provides access to accounts to check balances, view transactions, make transfers and deposit checks. CEFCU recently welcomed Thomas F. Rosenbaum as Caltech's 9th president. CEFCU sponsored TEDxCaltech 2013: The Brain—a one-day, multidisciplinary conference at the California Institute of Technology. CEFCU is also an annual sponsor of Caltech Y's Act Award.
