= Co-op Solutions =

US interbank network for credit unions

- Operating area: United States, Canada
- Founded: 1981 (as Co-op Network)
- Website: www.coop.org

CU Cooperative Systems, Inc. was a company providing services to credit unions in the United States. It is now a part of Velera, although the combined organization continues to use the Co-op Solutions brand. Other names it has used includes CO-OP Financial Services and Co-op Network. It operated an interbank network connecting the ATMs of credit unions in the United States, with locations also in Canada and certain United States Navy bases overseas.

It is was headquartered in Rancho Cucamonga, California.

== History ==
The CO-OP Network began in 1981 when 20 credit unions in California united their 32 ATMs. In 1986 the first CO-OP ATMs are deployed at 7-Eleven stores.

In 2002, the network added its first Canadian member, CS CO-OP.

In 2003, the network added 262 ATMs of the Navy Federal Credit Union which are located on U.S. Naval bases through the United States plus Africa, Bahrain, Cuba, Diego Garcia, Greece, Guam, Italy, Japan, Korea, Singapore and Spain. ATM access at these bases are restricted to individuals with the proper base security access.

In 2007, CO-OP members gained access to ATMs at 321 Costco Wholesale warehouses around the country.

In 2015, CO-OP acquired majority interest in Canadian payments solutions provider Everlink Payment Services Inc.

CO-OP acquired payment processor TMG in 2017, of which it held minority ownership since 2012.

In 2019 Co-op Solutions processed 7.6 billion financial transactions.

In January 2024, Co-op Solutions merged with PSCU. The merged company will be known as Velera, however it will continue to use Co-op Solutions as one of its brands.

== Shared branching ==
Co-op Solutions also provides what the company calls shared branching. Members of 1,800 credit unions can perform most teller transactions at any one of the network's 5,700 branches. This system was founded in 1975 by five Detroit-area credit unions to minimize costs associated with having their own branches.
