= Cooperative Hall of Fame =

Coordinates: 38°53′58.84″N 77°1′56.16″W

The Cooperative Hall of Fame recognizes individuals from the United States who have made outstanding contributions to cooperatives. The Hall of Fame was established in 1974 and is administered by the Cooperative Development Foundation. Nominations from the cooperative community are reviewed yearly by two committees composed of cooperative leaders. The committees make recommendations to the Board of Directors of National Cooperative Business Association (NCBA), who make the final decision.

The Cooperative League of the USA (now the NCBA) announced a Hall of Fame at its 29th biennial conference in San Francisco. The Cooperative Hall of Fame and Historical Society was established in 1974. By 1990, 64 people were inducted in the Hall. The Hall is located at NCBA's headquarters in Washington, D.C. As of 2012, there are 153 inductees, dubbed "heroes" by the Hall.

== Inductees ==
Cooperative Hall of Fame
Name	Image	Birth–Death	Year	Area of achievement
Mary E. Arnold		(1876–1968)	1976	Arnold was a co-founder of Consumers Cooperative Services, an organizer of housing cooperatives and credit unions, and director of the National Cooperative Business Association from 1927 to 1938 and from 1945 to 1950.
Howard E. Babcock		(1889–1950)	1976	Babcock was an agricultural cooperative leader. He was chair of the American Institute of Cooperation, co-president of the National Cooperative Council, and served on the Board of the Central Bank for Cooperatives
Howard A. Cowden			1976	Cowden founded Farmland Industries in 1929, which later became the Consumers Cooperative Association.
Edward Filene		(1860–1937)	1976	Filene was a businessman, social entrepreneur and philanthropist who built the Filene's department store chain. He was the main driver behind the push to pass legislation allowing for credit unions in the United States.
Harvey Hull			1976	Hull helped to create United Cooperatives (now Universal Cooperatives) and promoted credit unions and rural electrification.
Abraham E. Kazan		(1889–1971)	1976	Kazan is considered the father of cooperative housing in the United States. He developed housing cooperatives in New York City and helped the cooperative grocery stores form a federation.
Murray D. Lincoln			1976	Lincoln was President of the National Cooperative Business Association from 1941 to 1965 and served on the board of the International Cooperative Alliance.
John D. Miller			1976	Miller was largely responsible for drafting the Capper–Volstead Act. He was president of the National Cooperative Council and helped to create the National Milk Producers Federation.
William I. Myers			1976	Myers was a governor of the Farm Credit Administration and architect of the Farm Credit System.
Edwin Griswold Nourse		(1883–1974)	1976	Nourse helped to develop the American Institute of Cooperation.
A.J. Smaby			1976	Smaby was general manager of Midland Cooperatives. He was director of the Fund for International Cooperative Development and the NCBA.
Jerry Voorhis		(1901–1984)	1976	Voorhis was a five term California Congressman who served as executive director of the National Cooperative Business Association from 1947 to 1965. He helped to found the National Association of Housing Cooperatives and the Organization of Cooperatives of America.
James Peter Warbasse		(1866–1957)	1976	Warbasse was a surgeon who founded the Cooperative League of America (now NCBA) in 1916. He was the organization's president until 1941.
Eugene R. Bowen			1978	Bowen was an executive with the National Cooperative Business Association, helping to expand the organization.
George H. Dunlap			1978	Dunlap was chairman and CEO of Nationwide from 1969 to 1972. He was a central committee member for the International Cooperative Alliance and served on the board of the National Cooperative Business Association.
Thomas F. Ellerbe, Sr.			1978	Ellerbe founded the Cooperative Foundation in Minnesota and planned a cooperatively owned and run community at Circle Pines, Minnesota.
Hubert H. Humphrey		(1911–1978)	1978	Vice President Humphrey sponsored legislation establishing the National Consumers Cooperative Bank. He supported the development of farm, telephone and electric cooperatives and defended the Capper–Volstead Act.
Michael Shadid		(1882–1966)	1978	Shadid was a physician and the first president of the Cooperative Health Federation of America. He advocated for cooperative health care and preventive medicine.
Roy Bergengren		(1879–1955)	1979	With Edward Filene, Bergengren was the main actor behind the proliferation of credit unions across the United States.
D. W. Brooks		(1901–1999)	1979	Brooks organized the Cotton Producers Association and led the National Council of Farmer Cooperatives.
Clyde T. Ellis		(1908–1980)	1979	Ellis was a leader of electric cooperatives and general manager of the National Rural Electric Cooperative Association.
Joseph G. Knapp			1979	
Felix F. Rondeau			1979	
Andrew Volstead		(1860–1947)	1979	Andrew Volstead was a member of the United States House of Representatives from Minnesota, 1903–1923, and a member of the Republican Party. He was the creator and proponent of the Capper–Volstead Act, sometimes referred to as the "farmer cooperative Magna Carta."
Robert Neptune			1980	
M.W. Thatcher			1980	
Leslie E. Woodcock			1980	
Wallace J. Campbell			1981	
Fernand St. Germain		(1928–2014)	1981	
W. Gifford Hoag			1982	
Dorothy and George Jacobson			1982	
John Brandt			1983	
Jack R. Cluck			1983	
Louise McCarren Herring		(1909–1987)	1983	Herring was a charter member of the Credit Union National Association and campaigned for a law establishing credit unions in Ohio. She was the first managing director of the Ohio Credit Union League and helped organize over 500 credit unions in the United States. She was the second woman to be inducted into the Cooperative Hall of Fame.
Robert D. Partridge			1983	
Charles C. Teague			1983	
Jacob M. Kaplan			1985	
Owen Cooper			1985	
Roman N. Eller			1985	
Walter Harrison			1985	
Charles Holman			1985	
W.A. MacColl			1985	
Manly Glenwood Mann			1985	
Florence Parker			1985	
Leo H. Shapiro			1985	
E.G. Cort			1986	
Ed Jaenke			1986	
Aaron Sapiro		(1884–1959)	1986	Sapiro was a cooperative activist, lawyer and major leader of the farmers' movement during the 1920s. One of the many issues Sapiro spoke on was cooperative grain marketing and he was particularly active in California and Saskatoon in Saskatchewan.
Roger Willcox			1986	
Luther H. Buchele			1987	Buchele was the first executive director of the Inter-Cooperative Council at the University of Michigan.
Benjamin Franklin		(1706–1790)	1987	Founding Father and polymath, Franklin was
Maurice J. McKay			1987	
Albert McKnight			1987	
Emil A. Syftestad			1987	
Joseph L. Hansknecht			1988	
Wilfred E. Rumble			1988	
Beryle E. Stanton			1988	
William G. Wysor			1988	
Barbara Deverick			1989	
Ed Jones		(1912–1999)	1989	
Frank Sollars			1989	
Frank W. Hussey			1990	
R.C. Morgan			1990	
Harold Ostroff			1990	
Chalmers P. Wylie		(1920–1998)	1990	
Aubrey Davis			1991	
Jack and Connie McLanahan			1991	
Gonze Lee Twitty			1991	
Robert Vanderbeek			1992	
Samuel E. Bunker			1992	
Ralph Hofstad			1992	
Dwight Oberschlake			1992	
C.E. Toland			1992	Toland is the founder of Affiliated Foods Southwest.
Lloyd and Mary Anderson			1993	Lloyd and Mary Anderson are the founders of REI.
Orville L. Freeman		(1918–2003)	1993	
Ken Holum			1993	
Bob Bergland		(1928–)	1994	Bergland is a former Minnesota Congressman and Secretary of Agriculture under Jimmy Carter. He advocated for cooperatives as the vice president and general manager of the National Rural Electric Cooperative Association.
John E. Fisher		(1929–1998)	1994	
Gordon E. Lindquist			1994	
Fred & Virginia Thornthwaite			1994	
James L. Grahl			1995	
Alvin W. Jordan			1995	
David Smith			1995	David Smith was president of president of Penn South Co-op and one of the original organizers of the Coordinating Council of Cooperatives.
Burgee O. Amdahl			1996	
Glenn M. Anderson			1996	Glenn Anderson is a former president of the Cooperative League of the USA (now NCBA).
Katharine Whiteside Taylor			1996	Taylor founded the first cooperative preschool in California, Children's Community, in 1927.
A.A. Bailey			1997	
Stanley Dreyer			1997	
Woodrow Keown			1997	
W. Malcom Harding			1997	Harding was a leader in cooperative banking and helped to consolidate 11 Banks for Cooperatives into CoBank.
Henry Holloway			1998	Henry Holloway served on the Maryland Farm Bureau Board and the Nationwide Insurance Enterprise Board.
R. C. Robertson			1998	
Charles Stenholm		(1938–)	1998	Charles Stenholm is a Democratic Party politician from Texas, serving in the United States House of Representatives from 1979 to 2005. He was formerly President of the Texas Rural Electric Cooperative Association.
Richard H. Vilstrup			1998	
Owen K. Hallberg			1999	
John Earnest Johnson			1999	
Vaughn O. Sinclair			1999	
Dave and Erma Angevine			2000	Consumer Federation of America
Edgar F. Callahan		(1929–2009)	2000	Callahan was Chair of the National Credit Union Administration (NCUA).
Richard H. Magnuson			2000	
O. Glenn Webb			2000	
John B. Gauci			2001	
David A. Hamil			2001	
Otis & Mary Lee Molz			2001	
Francis L. Lair			2002	
Ralph K. Morris			2002	
C. William Swank			2002	
Herb Wegner			2003	
Doug Bereuter		(1939–)	2003	Doug Bereuter is a retired Republican politician from Nebraska, serving in the United States House of Representatives from 1979 until 2004. He introduced the Overseas Cooperative Development Act, which directed USAID to expand the use of cooperatives in its development programs.
Rod Nilsestuen			2003	Nilsestuen was Wisconsin's Secretary of Agriculture and founder of Cooperative Development Services.
J. K. Smith			2003	
Allen Thurgood-Connolly			2004	
Ralph Paige			2004	
Henry H. Schriver			2004	
Charles and Eva Rappaport			2005	The Rappaports were leaders in cooperative housing, both working for the Federation of 213s (later the Federation of New York Housing Cooperatives).
Robert I. Kabat			2005	Kabat was director of the Management Services Department of the National Rural Electric Cooperative Association and developed educational programs for electric cooperatives.
Pete Crear			2005	Crear helped establish the Credit Union National Association's relationship with the National Endowment for Financial Education.
Rebecca Allen			2006	
David O. Miller			2006	
Frank Morton Hunt, II			2006	
Thomas L. Lyon			2006	
David L. Chatfield			2007	
Jean Jantzen			2007	
John E. Gherty			2007	
Charles B. Gill			2007	
Gary Hanman			2008	
Terry Lewis			2008	Lewis is a former president of the National Association of Housing Cooperatives.
Douglas D. Sims			2008	
Walden Swanson & Kate Sumberg			2008	
Howard Brodsky and Alan Greenberg			2009	Brodsky and Greenberg are founders of Carpet One.
James R. Jones			2009	Jones is a leader in the student cooperative housing movement in North America. He has served as executive director of four student housing cooperatives as well as the North American Students of Cooperation.
Edward E. Slettom			2009	
Melbah M. Smith			2009	
Larry Blanchard			2010	
Glenn English		(1940-)	2010	English is CEO of the National Rural Electric Cooperative Association.
Werqu Mekasha			2010	
David Thompson			2010	Thompson is the author of Weavers of Dreams: The Founding of the Modern Co-operative Movement.
Noel Estenson			2011	Estenson was CEO of CHS Inc. until 2000, overseeing the merger of Cenex and Harvest States Cooperatives.
Gloria & Stanley Kuehn			2011	
Daniel A. Mica		(1944-)	2011	Mica was president and CEO of the Credit Union National Association (CUNA) from 1996 to 2010.
Shirley Sherrod			2011	Shirley Sherrod is the former Georgia State Director of Rural Development for the United States Department of Agriculture. She co-founded New Communities, a 6000-acre cooperative farm and was the Georgia State Director of the Federation of Southern Cooperatives.
Charles Snyder			2012	Snyder is president and CEO of the National Cooperative Bank.
Bill Gessner			2012	
William Davisson			2012	Davisson was CEO of the agricultural supply cooperative Growmark from 1998 to 2010.
Michael Cook			2012	Cook is a professor of Cooperative Leadership and executive director of The Graduate Institute of Cooperative Leadership (GICL), University of Missouri-Columbia.
Joy Cousminer			2013	Joy Cousminer is the founding president and CEO of Bethex Federal Credit Union.
Steven L. Dawson			2013	Steven L. Dawson is the founder of the Paraprofessional Healthcare Institute (PHI).
Rebecca Dunn			2013	Rebecca Dunn is the executive director of the Cooperative Fund of New England.
Leland Ruth			2013	Leland "Lee" Ruth is president of the Agricultural Council of California.
Martin J. Lowry			2014	Martin Lowry is a rural utilities leader.
Harriet May			2014	Harriet May is a credit union leader.
Papa Sene			2014	Papa M.D. Sene is an international development leader.
Barry Silver			2014	Barry Silver is a cooperative financer and the Executive Vice President of National Cooperative Bank.
Ann Hoyt			2015	Ann Hoyt, Ph.D. is a professor emeritus at University of Wisconsin-Madison.
William J. Nelson			2015	Agriculture and Education
Daniel T. Kelley			2015	Agriculture
Judy Ziewacz			2015	Judy Ziewacz is president and CEO of the National Cooperative Business Association/Cooperative League of the United States (NCBA/CLUSA)
Dennis Bolling			2016	Agriculture. Former president and CEO of United Producers, Inc.
Jessica Gordon Nembhard			2016	Education. Jessica Gordon Nembhard is Professor of Community Justice and Social Economic Development in the Department of Africana Studies at John Jay College, of the City University of New York (CUNY). She is the author of Collective Courage: A History of African American Cooperative Economic Thought and Practice.
Dennis Johnson			2016	Finance. Dennis Johnson is the former president and CEO of the Saint Paul Community Bank for Cooperatives.
Richard Larochelle			2017	Rural Utilities/Education. Richard Larochelle, retired Senior Vice President, National Rural Utilities Cooperative Finance Corporation.

== See also ==
- Credit unions in the United States
- History of the cooperative movement
