= Randolph-Brooks Federal Credit Union =

Credit union in Live Oak, Texas

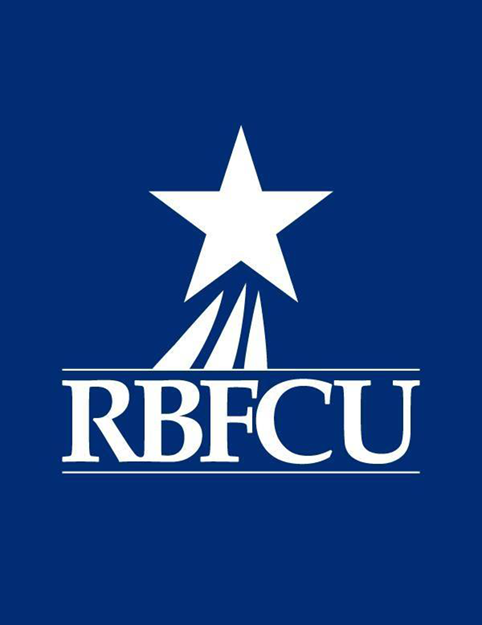
- Formerly: Randolph Federal Credit Union
- Founded: October 6, 1952; 74 years ago in Randolph Air Force Base, Texas, United States
- Headquarters: Live Oak, Texas, United States
- Key people: Mark Sekula, President/CEO
- Website: www.rbfcu.org

Randolph-Brooks Federal Credit Union (RBFCU) is a credit union headquartered in Live Oak, Texas, chartered and regulated under the authority of the National Credit Union Administration (NCUA). RBFCU serves more than 1.1 million members from a network of full-service branch locations in Texas and Oklahoma, and has more than $19 billion in assets. It is the largest credit union in Texas and the 10th largest credit union in the United States, based on total assets.

== History ==
RBFCU was opened in September 1952 with nine members and $45 in deposits. The charter was approved on October 6, 1952, by the Bureau of Federal Credit Unions (the federal governing body at the time). In August 1959, the field of membership was amended to include Brooks Air Force Base; on October 25, 1961, the credit union name changed from Randolph Federal Credit Union to Randolph-Brooks Federal Credit Union.

In 1995, the credit union merged with an Austin-based institution, Central Texas Catholic Credit Union. Following this addition, the credit union established a presence in the Austin community. On October 1, 2026, Oklahoma-based True Sky Federal Credit Union merged into RBFCU, which kept its name.

== Membership and organization ==
RBFCU's field of membership, as defined by the National Credit Union Administration, is select-group based, which means that membership is limited to individuals sharing a common bond. RBFCU currently offers membership to more than 4,000 select groups. Consumers can qualify for membership through a variety of ways, including where they live, work, worship or attend school.

As a credit union, RBFCU is a not-for-profit financial cooperative. It is owned by its members and governed by a volunteer board of directors, elected from its membership. RBFCU also operates several credit union service organizations. RBFCU has a history of strong military associations stemming from their roots serving the employees and active duty Air Force employees of Randolph Air Force Base in San Antonio, Texas.

== Employees ==
RBFCU employs more than 2,300 people across Texas, including locations in the San Antonio, Austin, Dallas, and Corpus Christi areas. RBFCU has been ranked among the Texas Monthly “Best Companies to Work for in Texas,” and has also been listed as a San Antonio Express-News’ Top Workplace and as one of the San Antonio Business Journal’s “Best Places to Work.”

Mark Sekula became CEO and President of RBFCU in March 2024.

== Services ==
RBFCU offers many products and services in common with other financial institutions, including savings accounts, checking accounts, loan products and mobile technology. RBFCU was among the first financial institutions in the United States to release a remote deposit platform that allowed members to make deposits from their mobile devices.

RBFCU also offers a low-interest credit card option, along with a rewards credit card that offers 2% cash back on credit card purchases for both consumer and business members. RBFCU partners with Mastercard for both their debit and credit card offerings.

== Competition ==
Several other financial services companies that specialize in serving parts of the military. The credit union competes with other military credit unions, like Pentagon Federal Credit Union, Air Force Federal Credit Union and Rally Credit Union, as well as with some large banks including USAA.

== Corporate headquarters ==
In 2012, RBFCU completed the construction of an addition to its new corporate headquarters, including the Randy M. Smith Cuseum, which provides recountings of the credit union's history and heritage through multiple media, including video, multimedia, art and sculpture. In 2018, a second addition was made to the corporate headquarters to allow space for more growth, and to expand upon employee amenity offerings such as a fitness center, café, health clinic and more.
