= Wright-Patt Credit Union =

Credit union based in Beavercreek, Ohio, United States

- Type: Credit union
- Industry: Financial services
- Founded: 1932
- Headquarters: Beavercreek, Ohio, United States
- Key people: Joseph Linsenmeyer, Board of Directors Chairman; Tim Mislansky, President & CEO
- Products: Savings; checking; consumer loans; mortgage loans; student loans; credit cards; investments; online banking
- Subsidiaries: myCUmortgage, LLC (CUSO)
- Website: wpcu.coop

Wright-Patt Credit Union (WPCU) is a US credit union or financial cooperative headquartered in Beavercreek, Ohio. The credit union was originally headquartered in Fairborn, Ohio; however, it relocated in early 2014. WPCU is registered as a state-chartered credit union, is the largest member-owned credit union in Ohio, and is one of the 50 largest credit unions in the United States. As of February 2026, WPCU has over $9.63 billion in assets, and over 526,500 members. WPCU is federally insured by the National Credit Union Administration (NCUA), which insures accounts in federal and most state-chartered credit unions in the United States. Deposits with Wright-Patt Credit Union are insured to $250,000.

== History ==
The organization that is now Wright-Patt Credit Union was founded in 1932. It was during the national economic depression of the early 1930s (the Great Depression) that federal employees at Wright Field (now Wright-Patterson Air Force Base) recognized the need for an “every person” financial institution. Since that time, WPCU has become Ohio's largest member-owned credit union and one of the largest in the United States. Today, WPCU serves thousands of members from numerous employer and community groups and associations. WPCU has been known by the following names since its inception:

- In 1932 – F.E.U. Local 148 Credit Union
- In 1948 – Wright Field Credit Union
- In 1951 – Dayton Federal Employees Credit Union
- In 1962 – Wright-Patt Credit Union

== Membership ==
As with all credit unions, membership in Wright-Patt Credit Union is limited to individuals sharing the common bond defined in its credit union charter. WPCU primarily serves the Greater Dayton Area in the Miami Valley Region of Ohio, but other select areas are also eligible to join. Membership in WPCU is limited to the following:

- Individuals who live, work, worship or attend school in Butler, Champaign, Clark, Clermont, Clinton, Darke, Delaware, Fairfield, Franklin, Greene, Hamilton, Licking, Madison, Miami, Montgomery, Pickaway, Preble, Union, or Warren Counties in Ohio.
- Military and civilian employees of Wright-Patterson Air Force Base (WPAFB).
- Military personnel residing in a 14-county area adjacent to the Fairborn area who do not have a credit union available.
- Retired United States Government military and civilian personnel.
- Government employees residing near WPAFB who do not have credit union facilities at their places of employment.
- Wright State University students, faculty, staff, and Alumni Association members.
- Select groups made up of people associated through employment, geographic location, or other organizational affiliation.
- Spouses, children, and certain other relatives of those eligible for WPCU membership.

== Organization ==
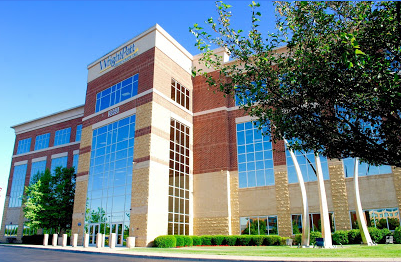
Wright-Patt Credit Union corporate office building in Beavercreek, Ohio

Wright-Patt Credit Union is a state-chartered credit union in Ohio, federally insured by the National Credit Union Administration (NCUA). Like all credit unions, WPCU is governed by a board of volunteers, elected by and from its membership. WPCU also owns a separate subsidiary, myCUmortgage, LLC, which operates as a credit union service organization (CUSO). CUSOs were established by NCUA as a way for credit unions to offer products and services that would normally be outside of the credit union's scope.

== Services ==
Wright-Patt Credit Union offers a full selection of products and services typically found at most financial institutions, including savings accounts, checking accounts, consumer loans and certificates of deposit. Credit unions are financial cooperatives so their savings accounts are referred to and recorded as “shares” because they represent members’ ownership of the credit union. Anyone eligible for membership can become an owner of the credit union by opening an account and depositing $5.00 into a “share” savings account. Additionally, WPCU offers its members small business loans, auto loans, mortgage loans, student loans, credit cards, lines of credit, health savings accounts, IRA accounts, direct deposit (through ACH), telephone banking, online banking, mobile banking, and remote deposit as well as many other services.

== Branches & ATM locations ==
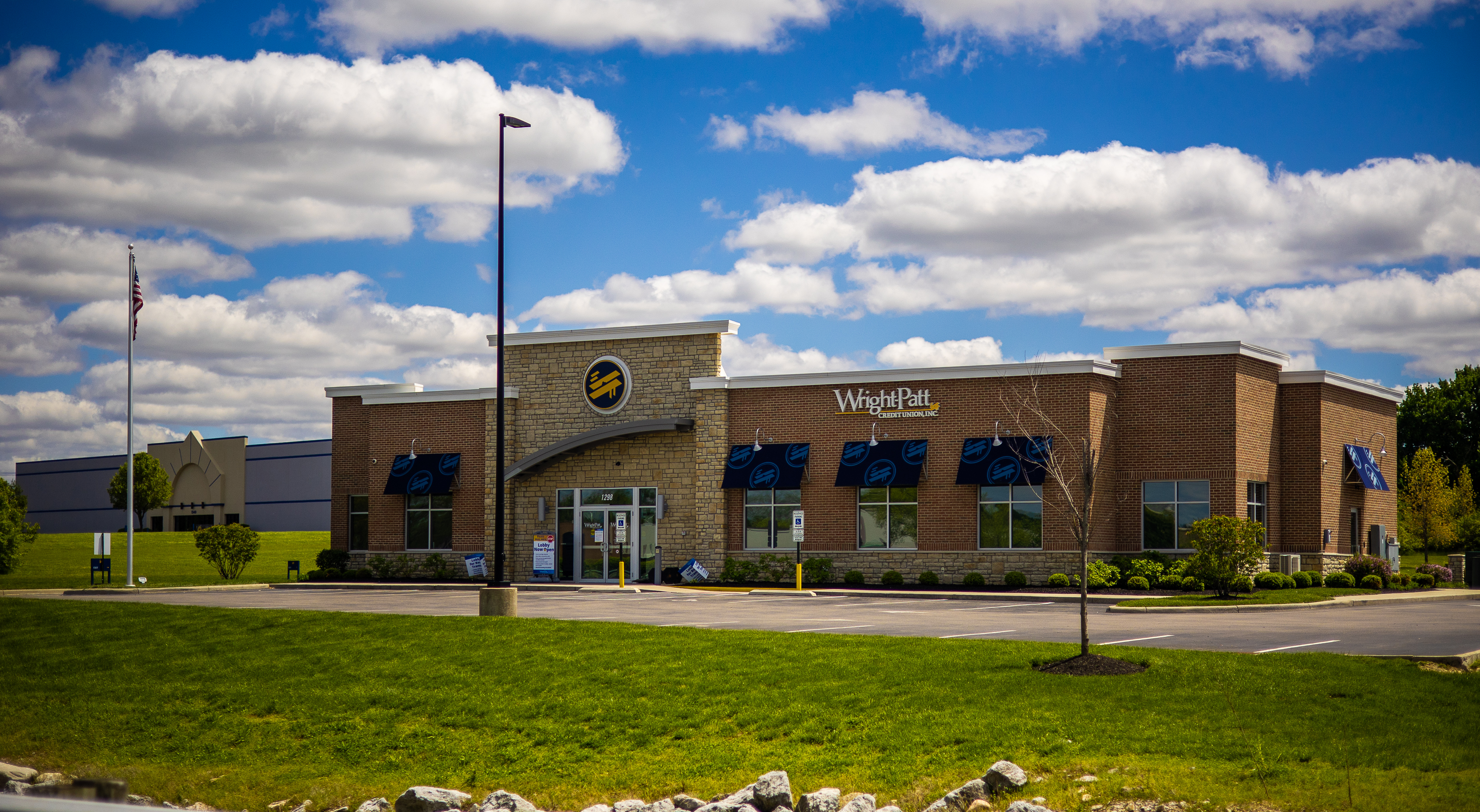
A location in Fairborn.

As of February 2022, Wright-Patt Credit Union operated 34 branches around the Greater Dayton area, Cincinnati and Columbus in Ohio. They also partnered with other ATM providers giving members lower-to-no-fee access to any Alliance One, CO-OP Network, or STAR ATM. WPCU has also partnered with other credit unions in the United States through the Shared Service Center network (CU Service Centers), which allows WPCU members to conduct most of their financial business at other credit union locations as if they were at their own local WPCU member center.

== Recognition ==
- #3 Most Convenient Credit Union in the U.S., 2018 by MagnifyMoney
- Best Bank in Ohio, 2017–2018 by Money.com
- Top 10 Best Mobile Apps in the U.S., 2017 by MagnifyMoney
- Top 10 Best Mobile Apps in the U.S., 2016 by MagnifyMoney
- Top 10 Best Mobile Apps in the U.S., 2015 by MagnifyMoney
- Ranked #1 in Best Ohio Credit Unions, 2019 by Forbes
- 2020 Gold Fee Lender - Dayton-Kettering, OH by OriginationData
- Best Customer Service Business, 2021 by Dayton Business Journal
