= Navy Federal Credit Union =

Credit union in the United States

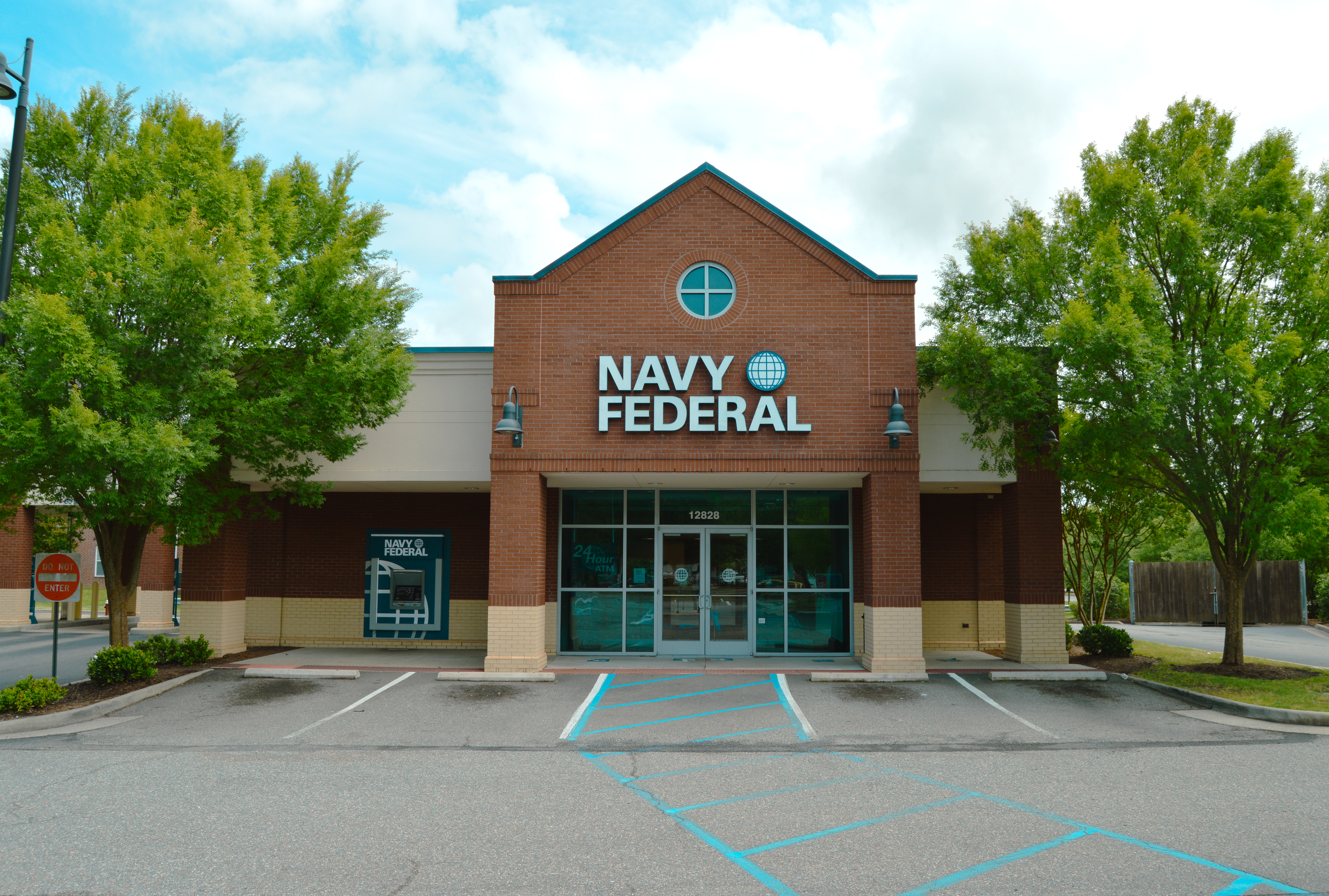
- Navy Federal Credit Union branch in Newport News, Virginia
- Type: Credit union
- Industry: Financial services
- Founded: March 13, 1933; 93 years ago
- Headquarters: Vienna, Virginia, United States
- Number of locations: 392
- Area served: Worldwide
- Key people: Dietrich Kuhlmann (President & CEO); Edward R Cochrane, Jr. (Chairman)
- Products: Checking; consumer loans; mortgages; credit cards; investments; online banking; certificates of deposit (CDs); money marketing account; IRA; ESA
- Total assets: $204.3 Billion USD (June 2026)
- Members: 15,700,000 (June 2026)
- Number of employees: 25,450
- Subsidiaries: Navy Federal Investment Services (NFIS) (CUSO)
- Website: navyfederal.org

Navy Federal Credit Union (or Navy Federal) is an American global credit union headquartered in Vienna, Virginia, chartered and regulated under the authority of the National Credit Union Administration (NCUA). Navy Federal is the largest natural member (or retail) credit union in the United States, both in asset size and in membership. As of June 2026, Navy Federal has US $204.3 billion in assets and has 15.7 million members.

== History ==
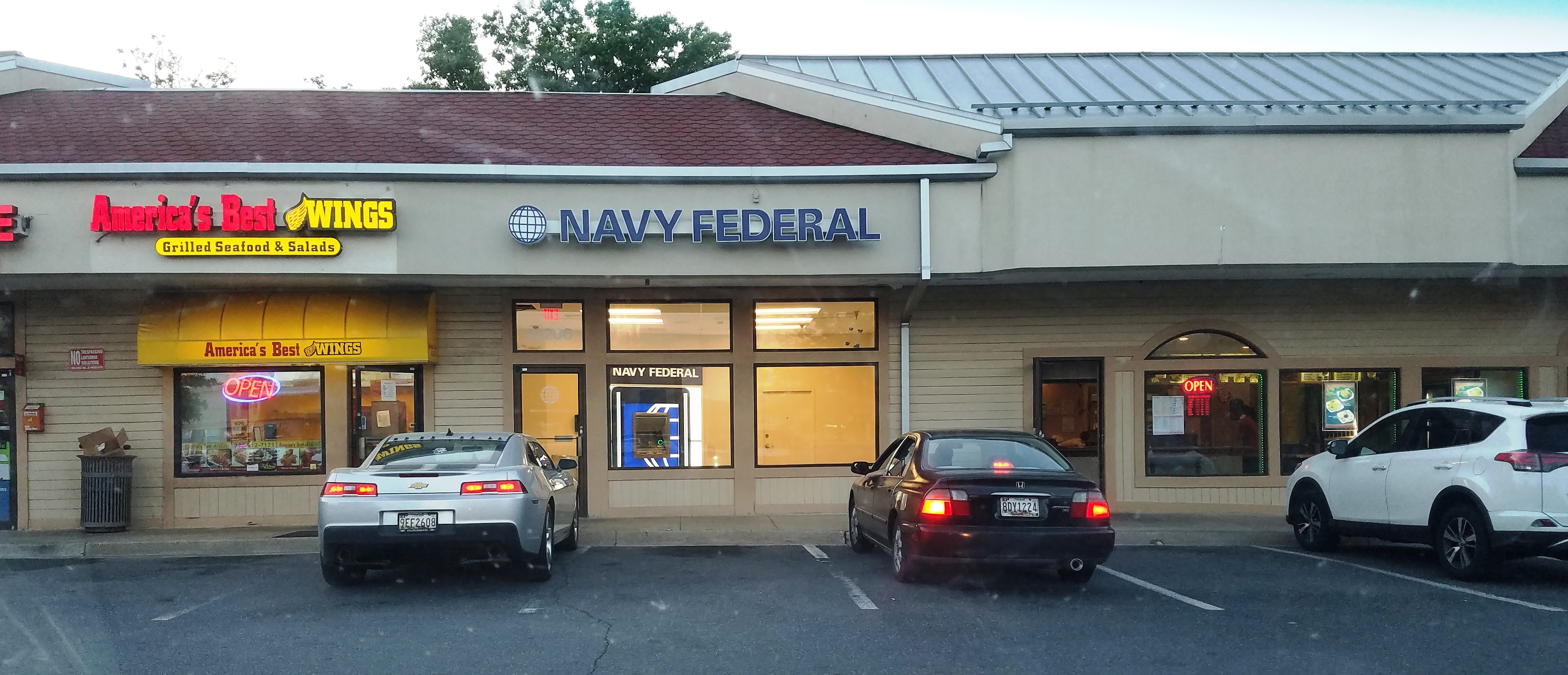
NFCU ATM-only vestibule in Gaithersburg, Maryland, c. May 2022

Navy Federal was originally incorporated on 17 January 1933 as the Navy Department Employees' Credit Union of the District of Columbia (NDCU). Only Navy Department employees who were members of the federal employees' labor union and members of their families were eligible to join. The next year, President Roosevelt signed into law the Federal Credit Union Act, which would eventually become the basis of business for the credit union. On July 17, 1947, the credit union was granted a federal charter as a credit union, named Navy Department Employees Federal Credit Union (NDEFCU). It also expanded membership to include all Navy personnel in the Washington, D.C., area, both military and civilian.

In 1954, the credit union changed its charter again to open membership to Navy and Marine Corps officers everywhere, regardless of geographic location, and changed its name to Navy Federal Credit Union. Eventually, membership was opened to enlisted personnel as well. By April 1962, the credit union reached a milestone, becoming the biggest credit union in the world, a distinction which it still holds today. In 1977, the credit union moved into its current headquarters in Vienna, Virginia, eventually undergoing several major expansions of its facility there.

In 2003, the credit union opened its membership further, to include Navy contractors. There have also been several times in the credit union's history that the NCUA has asked Navy Federal to merge with or absorb other credit unions that were experiencing financial or other difficulties. Members of these prior credit unions remained members of Navy Federal after the merger (following the NCUA's policy of "once a member, always a member"). In September 2010, Navy Federal Credit Union announced plans to absorb/merge with USA Fed, stating that joint operations would begin 4 October 2010 under the Navy Federal banner.

In May 2008, Navy Federal Credit Union widened its membership to include the entire Department of Defense, which made eligible all active duty, retired, and reserve Army, Navy, Marine Corps, and Air Force personnel, as well as contractor and civilian personnel within the Department of Defense. In March 2013, Navy Federal Credit Union further widened its membership to include all Coast Guard members and employees as well. In 2017, the credit union expanded its field of membership to include all Veterans. In 2020, Navy Federal Credit Union also expanded its membership to include Space Force members. In 2014, Navy Federal expanded its Vienna headquarters. As of June 2026, 5,600 employees worked at the Vienna location.

An increase in membership also led to three expansions: one at the credit union's San Diego location in 2010, where Navy Federal has 210 employees; one at the credit union's Pensacola location in 2015, where Navy Federal has 8,550 employees; and one at the Winchester Operations location in 2019 where Navy Federal has 2,450 employees.

As of 2025, Navy Federal is by far the largest credit union in the United States, with total assets nearly three times that of the second-largest US credit union.

Financial Summary
($ millions)	2018	2019	2020	2021	2022	2023	2024	2025
Assets	$96,962.4	$111,986.1	$135,664.1	$153,433.0	$156,645.1	$170,801.1	$197,100.0	$197,100.0
Loans Outstanding	$75,059.2	$83,919.9	$91,679.8	$95,811.3	$109,985.4	$127,166.4	$143,500.0	$143,500.0
Savings, Checking, MMSAs, IRAs	$50,626.6	$56,733.7	$81,902.8	$103,484.3	$104,372.5	$97,262.6	$101,076.7	$111,014.7
Share Certificates	$19,790.9	$29,299.6	$29,302.3	$24,275.2	$29,062.6	$47,068.7	$50,759.5	$55,548.8
Member's Equity	$11,404.7	$13,763.6	$14,932.4	$16,910.2	$14,168.1	$14,239.1	18,900.0	18,908.2
Gross Income	$6,818.6	$7,993.2	$8,374.0	$8,271.7	$9,315.9	$12,511.8	$14,397.6	$15,025.4
Non-Interest Expense	$2,844.1	$3,430.8	$3,920.8	$4,515.5	$4,767.5	$5,349.4	$5,957.6	$6,463.6
Dividends	$642.6	$1,016.4	$1,123.3	$829.2	$885.8	$2,368.5	$2,963.1	$3,110.1
Mortgage Loans Serviced	$68,697.7	$77,307.3	$80,585.6	$79,515.7	$84,277.4	$88,380.2	$93,558.6	$98,638.9
Members	8,232,022	8,959,665	9,927,166	11,133,370	12,322,979	13,342,112	14,266,170	15,139,001

=== Legal issues ===
In 2017, Navy Federal Credit Union settled a class action lawsuit over millions of unwanted phone calls, many of which had gone to individuals who were not credit union members and specifically asked not to be contacted. NFCU settled a similar class action lawsuit in 2020 over unwanted text messages, paying out $9.25 million. In 2021, Navy Federal Credit Union settled another class action lawsuit over a non-sufficient funds fee lawsuit over breached member agreements where over 700,000 members were charged multiple insufficient funds fees. In November 2024, “Navy Federal was ordered by the CFPB (Consumer Financial Protection Bureau) to pay more than $95 million in redress and fines for charging illegal overdraft fees, the largest penalty ever charged to a credit union for illegal activity. Navy Federal charged surprise overdraft fees on certain ATM withdrawals and debit card purchases, even when customer accounts showed sufficient funds at the time of the transaction. It also showed that funds from peer-to-peer transfer services were available to spend when they were in fact still pending, and then charged overdraft fees when customers attempted to spend those funds.”

== Membership ==
Navy Federal's field of membership is set by the National Credit Union Administration (NCUA). As with all federally-chartered credit unions, membership in Navy Federal is limited to individuals sharing the common bond defined in its credit union charter. Membership in Navy Federal is limited to:

- All Department of Defense (DoD) uniformed personnel — Army, Navy, Air Force, Space Force, and Marine Corps retirees and annuitants
- All DoD reservists — Army, Navy, Air Force, and Marine Corps— regardless of drill status — retirees and annuitants
- All US Coast Guard uniformed personnel — regardless of drill status — civilian employees, auxiliarists, retirees, and annuitants
- All Army National Guard and Air National Guard personnel — regardless of drill status — civilian employees, retirees, and annuitants
- All DoD Officer Candidate programs: midshipmen and cadets at the United States Naval Academy, United States Military Academy, United States Air Force Academy, United States Coast Guard Academy, and the United States Merchant Marine Academy; personnel in Officer Candidate programs
- All DoD current and retired civilian employees
- U.S. government employees assigned to DoD installations
- DoD contractors assigned to U.S. government installations
- Employees of Navy Federal Credit Union
- Family members, including grandparents, parents, spouses, siblings, grandchildren, cohabitants and children (including adopted, foster and stepchildren).
- All Honorably Discharged Veterans

== Organization ==
Navy Federal is chartered with NCUA as a single-sponsor credit union, with its sponsor being the Department of Defense. Like all credit unions, Navy Federal is governed by a board of volunteers, elected by and from its membership. Navy Federal also has a separate subsidiary, named Navy Federal Investment Services, which operates as a credit union service organization (CUSO). CUSOs were established by NCUA as a way for credit unions to pursue product offerings that would normally be outside of the purview of a credit union.

== Employees ==
As of June 2026, the credit union had over 25,450 employees worldwide. Navy Federal, founded in 1933, has never had a layoff, choosing instead to move employees to other departments to avoid layoffs. It was ranked number 82 on the 2026 Fortune's 100 Best Companies to Work For list, which is produced by the Great Place to Work Institute. They were 95th in 2012, rose to 56th in 2013, 96th in 2014, 72nd in 2015, 44th in 2016, 29th in 2019 19th in 2020, 59th 2021, 76th in 2022, 53rd in 2023, 37th in 2024, and 74th in 2025.

On March 1, 2024, Dietrich Kuhlmann was appointed President and CEO of Navy Federal Credit Union, succeeding Mary McDuffie.

== Services ==
Navy Federal operates branches in many U.S. metro areas as well as in some overseas locations, comprising a total of 392 branches worldwide as of June 2026. In addition, members can make transactions through the CO-OP network of more than 30,000 ATMs in the U.S. and Canada without incurring surcharges or fees.

Major banking competitors include Pentagon Federal Credit Union and USAA.

== Charitable contributions ==
Navy Federal Credit Union engages in multiple charitable partnerships, including a decades-long relationship with Toys for Tots, dedicated to helping families surrounding the Vienna, Virginia, headquarters, and a partnership with the National Hockey League's Stick Tap for Service Program. Navy Federal has also made multiple disaster relief donations, most recently a $100,000 donation to United Way of West Florida, to assist communities near their Pensacola, Florida offices that were adversely affected by Hurricane Sally in October 2020.

Navy Federal recently donated $100,000 through its Dollars for Doers program which, based on nominations from the credit union’s employees, awards 100 nonprofits with grants. Navy Federal donated to U.S. Vets in November 2021 in honor of Veteran’s Month. During Navy Federal’s annual drive for the Marine Toys for Tots Foundation in the 2021 holiday season, members and employees donated over $20,000 and 20,000 toys to families in need.

In 2022, Navy Federal’s members and employees donated over $33,000 and over 22,000 toys to families in need during the Toys for Tots campaigns. In 2024, Navy Federal donated over $48,000 and more than 23,000 toys to the campaign.

In 2023, the credit union donated more than one million meals to servicemembers, veterans, and their families as a part of its recent military food insecurity campaign, No Plate Left Behind. In 2024, No Plate Left Behind donated more than 1.4 million meals.

In 2024, Navy Federal committed $9 million over three years to the United Service Organizations to develop a financial wellness education program and other resources for early-career military servicemembers and their spouses.

During the 2025 federal government shutdown, Navy Federal dispersed more than 190,000 loans totaling more than $345 million, with zero interest charged and zero impact to members' credit histories.

== Awards ==
Navy Federal Credit Union has received the following awards and honors:

- Ranked #1 for Customer Experience Among Multichannel Banks/Credit Unions in Forrester's 2021 US Customer Experience (CX) survey
- Ranked #1 for Customer Experience Among Credit Card Issuers in Forrester's 2021 US Customer Experience (CX) survey
- Ranked "Credit Union of the Year" by United States Navy for 15th consecutive year in a row
- Ranked 7th in Computerworld's Best Places to Work in IT for 2021
- Ranked 25th in "75 Best Large Workplaces for Women" list by Fortune in 2021
- Ranked #1 for Customer Experience Among Multichannel Banks/Credit Unions in Forrester's 2021 US Customer Experience (CX) survey
- Ranked #1 for Customer Experience Among Credit Card Issuers in Forrester's 2021 US Customer Experience (CX) survey
- Received the highest score in the J.D. Power 2021 U.S. Consumer Financing Satisfaction Study
- Ranked 59th in "100 Best Companies to Work For" list by Fortune in 2021
- One of America's Best Employers for Veterans, Best Employers for Diversity, and Best Employers for New Grads by Forbes
- One of GOBankingRates Best Credit Unions of 2021
- Top Credit Union by Bankrate 2022
- Best Mortgage Lender by Bankrate
- Top 100 Best Banks by GOBankingRates
- One of GOBankingRates Best Credit Unions of 2022
- Best Home Equity Loans of 2020: Best Customer Experience by Money.com
- Best Mortgage Lender by U.S. News & World Report
- 4th in Customer Experience Excellence by KPMG in 2020, falling from 1st in 2019
- Best Overall Personal Loan of 2022 for Veterans & Military Members from Forbes
- Ranked as the 4th Top Workplace in the Washington, D.C., area by The Washington Post
- Ranked #1 for Customer Experience Among Multichannel Banks/Credit Unions in Forrester's 2022 US Customer Experience (CX) survey
- Best Auto Loans for New Car Purchase in 2022 by Bankrate
- Ranked 35th in "100 Best Large Workplaces for Women" list by Fortune in 2022
- Ranked 53rd in "100 Best companies to Work for" by Fortune
- One of GOBankingRates Best Credit Unions of 2023.
- Ranked 84th in "America's Best Employers For Women" list by Forbes in 2023
- Ranked 88th in "Best Workplaces for Millennials" list by Fortune in 2023
- Money's Best Overall Credit Union for Military Members in 2023-2024
- U.S. Veterans Magazine's Top Veteran-Friendly Company in 2023
- Ranked 3rd in "Best Employers in Virginia" by Forbes in 2023
- Ranked 8th in "Best Employers in Maryland" by Forbes in 2023
- Ranked 13th in "Best Workplaces in Financial Services & Insurance" list by Fortune in 2023
- Ranked 14th in "Best Places to Work in IT" list by Computerworld in 2023
- Ranked 33rd in "100 Best Large Workplaces for Women" list by Fortune in 2023
- Ranked 84th in "America's 100 Most Loved Workplaces" list by Newsweek in 2023
- Ranked 45th in "Best Workplaces for Parents" list by Great Place To Work in 2023
- GoBankingRates' Best Balance Transfer Credit Card for 2023
- Ranked 69th in "America's Best Large Employers" list by Forbes in 2024
- The Motley Fool Ascent's Best Bank for Veterans in 2024
- Latino Leaders Magazine's Best Banking Company for Latinos to Work For in 2024
- RippleMatch's Campus Forward Award for Large Early Career Programs in 2024
- The Balance's Best Personal Loan for Military Members in 2024
- USA Today Customer Service Champion for 2024
- Ranked 87th in "America's Best Employers for New Grads" list by Forbes in 2024
- Ranked 11th in "Largest Top Workplaces" list by The Washington Post in 2024
- Inman Best of Finance Award for 2024
- Business Group on Health Best Employers: Excellence in Health & Well-Being Award for 2024
- Ranked 12th in "America's Best Employers For Tech Workers" list by Forbes in 2024
- Ranked 54th in "America's Best Employers For Veterans" list by Forbes in 2024
- Ranked 77th in "100 Companies That Care" list by People in 2024
- Ranked 77th in "Best Employers for Vets" list by Military Times in 2024
- Ranked 87th in "100 Best Large Workplaces for Millennials" list by Fortune in 2024
- Ranked 94th in "America's 100 Most Loved Workplaces" list by Newsweek in 2024
- Ranked 99th in "100 Best Large Workplaces for Women" list by Fortune in 2024
- Money's Top 100 Best Banks in 2025
- Computer World's Best Places to Work in IT in 2025
- Named to "America's Most Trusted Brands" list by USA Today in 2025
- Named to "America's Best Customer Service" list by USA Today in 2025
- Ranked 170th in "America's Most Innovative Companies" list by Fortune in 2025
- Ranked 5th in "America's Best Large Employers" list by Forbes in 2025
- Ranked 5th in Finance & Money category of "America's Best Online Platforms" list by Newsweek in 2025
- Ranked 1st in Banks category of "Most Trustworthy Companies in America" list by Newsweek in 2025
- Ranked 63rd in "America's Best Employers For New Grads" list by Forbes in 2025
- Ranked 8th in "Top Workplaces 2025" list by The Washington Post in 2025
- Ranked 2nd in "Best Companies to Work For in Finance and Insurance" list by U.S. News & World Report in 2025
- Ranked 27th in "100 Companies That Care" list by People in 2025
- Ranked 77th in "America's Best Employers For Tech Workers" list by Forbes in 2025
- Ranked 139th in "America's Best Employers For Company Culture" list by Forbes in 2025
- U.S. Veterans Magazine's Top Veteran-Friendly Company in 2025
- Ranked 20th in "Top Military Spouse Employers" list by Forbes in 2025
- Most Loved Workplace's America's Most Loved Workplaces 2025
- Money's Best Bank for Members of the Military in 2026
- Ranked 20th in “Top Military Spouse Employers for 2025” list by Military.com
- Ranked 55th in "Best Employers for Vets" list by Military Times in 2025
- Latino Leaders Magazine's Best Banking Company for Latinos to Work For in 2025
- Ranked 74th in "100 Best Companies to Work For" list by Fortune in 2025
- Money's Best Overall Credit Union for Military Members in 2025
- Named to "America's Best Customer Service" list by USA Today in 2026
- Named to "America's Most Trusted Brands" list by USA Today in 2026
- Named "Best Lender" by U.S. News & World Report in 2026
- Recognized as "America's Most Trusted Mortgage Lender" by Lifestory Research in 2026
- Ranked 17th in "America's Best Large Employers" list by Forbes in 2026
- Ranked 85th in "100 Companies That Care" list by People in 2026
- Named to U.S. Veterans Magazine's "Top Veteran-Friendly Employers" list in 2026
- Named to "America's Most Patriotic Companies" list by Newsweek in 2026
