= Credit Union Membership Access Act =

- Long title: An Act to amend the Federal Credit Union Act to clarify existing law with regard to the field of membership of Federal credit unions, to preserve the integrity and purpose of Federal credit unions, to enhance supervisory oversight of insured credit unions, and for other purposes.
- Enacted by: the 105th United States Congress

Citations
- Public law: Pub. L. 105-219
- Statutes at Large: 112 Stat. 913

Legislative history
- Introduced in the House as H.R. 1151 by Steven LaTourette on March 20, 1997; Signed into law by President Bill Clinton on August 7, 1998

The Credit Union Membership Access Act is an Act for the United States government that amended the Federal Credit Union Act in 1998. The bill was proposed on the heels of the Supreme Court decision in NCUA v. First National Bank & Trust against the National Credit Union Administration, a key victory in the American Bankers Association's legislative agenda and a major setback to credit unions. The Act reversed this ruling, authorizing credit unions to have multiple common bonds among their memberships.

H.R. 1151 was introduced to the 105th United States Congress by Congressmen Steven LaTourette (R-OH) and Paul Kanjorski (D-PA). The Act was signed into law on August 7, 1998, by President Bill Clinton.

== History ==
In 1990, the American Bankers Association (ABA) and several North Carolina banks filed a lawsuit contesting a decision by the National Credit Union Administration (NCUA), the federal regulator of credit unions. The NCUA had approved a membership expansion for AT&T Family Federal Credit Union in Asheboro, allowing it to serve small employee groups not related to the telecommunications giant.

Since 1934, federal credit unions in the United States were defined as groups tied together by a single common bond of occupation or association, or by residence within a certain geographic area. In 1982, the NCUA began permitting credit unions to be composed of multiple unrelated employer groups.

The bankers sued, contending that AT&T Family Federal's membership expansion was wrong and said the NCUA had violated the Federal Credit Union Act.

The case was heard before a Washington, D.C. District Court in September 1994. It ruled that the NCUA's policy of permitting multiple groups in one field of membership was a correct interpretation of the Federal Credit Union Act.

The decision was appealed by the bankers. In July 1996, the U.S. Court of Appeals D.C. Circuit overturned the District Court decision and ruled that all members of a federal credit union must share one common bond. The Court of Appeals ordered the district court to apply its decision to AT&T Family Federal Credit Union. The bankers filed a separate suit asking the district court for a nationwide injunction and to have the decision applied to all federally chartered credit unions with multiple groups.

The ruling meant federal credit unions would no longer be able to add new groups to their fields of membership.

The AT&T Family Federal case was consolidated with others from the ABA. In February 1997, the U.S. Supreme Court announced it would issue a decision on the case, which would come the next year. Meanwhile, in an attempt to protect access of credit unions, the Credit Union Membership Access Act, H.R. 1151, was introduced to Congress in March 1997 to allow multiple common bonds.

On February 25, 1998, the Supreme Court issued a ruling that favored the banking industry's interpretation of the Federal Credit Union Act: that federal credit unions may not consist of more than one occupational group having a single common bond. This ruling could have resulted in millions federal credit union members being forced to leave their credit unions.

In April 1998, the U.S. House of Representatives passed H.R. 1151, but the bill still needed to pass the U.S. Senate. On July 14, 1998, over six thousand credit union supporters assembled in Washington, D.C., and the Capitol to urge the bill's passage.

The bill passed the U.S. Senate on July 28, 1998, and was signed into law by President Bill Clinton. The law codified the eligibility of family and household members, and the NCUA to define community fields of membership.
