= Denali Alaskan Home Loans =

Denali Alaskan Home Loans is the home-financing department of Denali Federal Credit Union, based in Anchorage, Alaska, offering a variety of mortgage services for members of the Credit Union throughout Alaska. The Credit Union purchased Northern Pacific Mortgage in May, 2001.

Denali FCU President & CEO Bob Teachworth explained the purchase at that time: “We have studied various methods and programs to expand the Credit Union’s mortgage program, ranging from partnerships to creating a mortgage division within the existing Real Estate Lending department. Ultimately, Denali FCU decided to purchase an Alaska mortgage firm rather than create a full-service mortgage department from scratch.” The purchase allowed Denali FCU to offer conventional investor-backed mortgage products, such as VA, FHA or AHFC loans, which it did not offer prior to the purchase of Northern Pacific Mortgage. (The Credit Union's Real Estate Lending department offered other home lending products, such as home equity lines of credit, home improvement loans and construction loans.)

Initially, Denali FCU created a credit union service organization (CUSO), as required by its federal regulator, the National Credit Union Administration, as a separate firm, called Denali Alaskan Mortgage Company. The CUSO allowed Denali FCU to operate a for-profit entity, the mortgage company, while still retaining its distinction as a non-profit financial cooperative for members.

In 2005, Denali FCU decided to shut down the separate Mortgage CUSO and absorbed the company's operations within the Credit Union. As such, a separate company called Denali Alaskan Mortgage Company no longer exists. Rather, since 2005 it has been operated as an internal department of the Credit Union.

In April 2011, Denali Alaskan Mortgage changed its name to Denali Alaskan Home Loans. In June, 2011, the Credit Union opened offices of its Insurance and Home Loans business units in the Mat-Su Valley. As a result of this move, the Credit Union closed its Insurance office which had previously been located in Eagle River. Denali's insurance unit was acquired by Hub International in 2016.
