= Western Bridge Corporate Federal Credit Union =

Defunct US financial cooperative for credit unions

- Company type: Credit union
- Industry: Financial services
- Founded: 1969
- Defunct: July 6, 2012
- Headquarters: 924 Overland Ct San Dimas, California; United States
- Key people: Philip Perkins, CEO
- Website: wescorp.org

Western Bridge Corporate Federal Credit Union, or WesCorp, was a financial services cooperative headquartered in San Dimas, California. As a corporate credit union, WesCorp provided services to natural person (consumer) credit unions. WesCorp served America's credit union industry as an aggregator of financial products and services for the purpose of delivering cost-savings and greater efficiencies to more than 950 member/owner credit unions throughout the United States.

On March 20, 2009, NCUA placed WesCorp into conservatorship. The company was officially dissolved on July 6, 2012.

== Corporate history ==
=== California Central Federal Credit Union ===
In 1969, the leaders of California's credit union movement collectively recognized the need for a non-competitive service provider. From this common vision, the California Central Federal Credit Union was chartered. The nation's first federally chartered central credit union, California Central FCU was originally created to serve the liquidity needs of credit unions and credit union organizations in California. In 1975, CCFCU expanded its field of membership to include all credit unions and credit union associations in National Credit Union Administration Region VI, becoming the nation's first regional corporate.

=== Western Corporate Federal Credit Union ===
In 1976 the credit union changed its name to Western Corporate Federal Credit Union (WesCorp) to reflect a desire to serve organizational needs within the parameters of a regional charter. Natural person members, although allowed in the original charter, were discontinued as the corporate focused exclusively on institutional business. WesCorp finished 1977 with $229.3 million in assets.

=== Western Bridge Corporate Federal Credit Union ===
On March 20, 2009, WesCorp was taken over by regulators and renamed Western Bridge Corporate Federal Credit Union.

=== United Resources Federal Credit Union ===
In 2011 Western Bridge Corporate Federal Credit Union sought to capitalize a new corporate credit union for the western states called United Resources Federal Credit Union. This effort failed to obtain sufficient funds and Catalyst Corporate Federal Credit Union was approved on December 14, 2011, to purchase its operations.

== See also ==
- Central Liquidity Facility
