= NCUA Corporate Stabilization Program =

The NCUA Corporate Stabilization Program was created on January 28, 2009, in response to investment losses incurred at U.S. Central Credit Union. U.S. Central was a third-level corporate credit union that provided services to other corporate credit unions, which in turn served public-facing credit unions.

The National Credit Union Administration (NCUA) is an autonomous agency of the United States federal government, and is responsible for regulating and insuring all federally insured credit unions in the United States.

The NCUA's plan calls for all federally insured natural-person credit unions in the U.S. to pay an increased insurance premium to the National Credit Union Share Insurance Fund (NCUSIF) in 2009 to make up for the investment losses at U.S. Central, to which the NCUSIF has written a $1 billion capital note. However, NCUA has provided no assurances that the capital losses of the corporate credit unions to be covered through the planned assessment in 2009 will be adequate to cover eventual bad debt losses.

== See also ==
- National Credit Union Administration
- Federal Deposit Insurance Corporation
- Credit union
- Credit Union National Association
- Central liquidity facility
- Troubled Assets Relief Program
