= Credit union league =

Cooperative federation for credit unions

A credit union league or credit union central is cooperative federation for credit unions.

== Canada ==
In Canada, a credit union central is a back-end provider which provides infrastructure such as cheque clearance and online banking to its member institutions. Historically, one credit union central per province served multiple independent local institutions which were too small to economically build all of their own infrastructure to support ATM cashpoints, debit and payment cards, stock and mutual fund brokerage, online banking, wire transfers and cheque clearance. These groups (with the exception of Québec and neighbouring francophone communities, which were served by Desjardins) would in turn join a national group, the Credit Union Central of Canada. That group (and, separately, Desjardins) would then join the Canadian Payments Association, providing its member institutions with access to the clearing house.

While it is nominally possible for an individual credit union to remain outside the credit union central by obtaining their own institution number and purchasing cheque clearing services from one of the big-six banks, the cost of relying on a direct competitor for access is typically high. Even Alterna Bank, a captive online bank owned by Alterna Savings and Credit Union, relies on Central 1 for its online banking and payment clearance infrastructure ― despite legally not being itself a credit union.

Many of the individual provincial-level centrals are disappearing as a result of mergers and amalgamations; the BC and Ontario centrals were merged as Central 1 while the centrals for all four Atlantic provinces were merged as Atlantic Central. The advocacy and trade association roles of the Credit Union Central of Canada have been replaced by the Canadian Credit Union Association, while its role as point of access to the payments clearing system (for institutions and associations outside Quebec and outside the Desjardins movement) has been taken over by Central 1.

The Canadian Central is itself a member of the Canadian Co-operative Association, while Desjardins is a member of the Conseil canadien de la coopération et de la mutualité.

== United States ==
In the United States a credit union league is a state-level trade association for credit unions, which are not-for-profit financial cooperatives. Credit union leagues hold a primary interest in the Credit Union National Association (CUNA).

Many credit union leagues were formed through the efforts of the Credit Union National Extension Bureau in the 1920s. In 1934, Congress enacted the Federal Credit Union Act and the CUNA was formed. The term "league" was employed to denote a mutually supportive organization for the promotion and success of credit unions. Each state in the United States, as well as Washington, D.C., Puerto Rico and Guam, had its own League. State leagues also designed the corporate credit union model, to serve as the "credit union's credit union" by providing financial services independent of the commercial banking industry.

From the 1930s until the 1970s, one of the chief duties of the League system was to promote and help facilitate the chartering of new credit unions. However, increased regulation and higher capitalization requirements, combined with the decline in American manufacturing job creation, virtually ended the formation of new credit unions except in special circumstances.

Leagues also operate for profit "services corporations" which provide services (credit card processing, commercial printing, ATM networks, shared service centers, etc.) to credit unions and to other state leagues.

Consolidation of statewide Leagues began in the late 1980s and accelerated in the 1990s. Also in the 1990s, a move to modernize the names of Leagues also began to happen. In Ohio, for example, the organization became known as the Ohio Credit Union System, with the Ohio Credit Union League becoming just one of four components of the system umbrella.

Leagues also perform the function of lobbying state legislatures for laws that are beneficial to credit unions through the registered lobbyists.

== See also ==
- Corporate credit union
- Credit union service organization
