= Security Service Federal Credit Union =

American credit union

- Type: Credit union
- Industry: Financial services
- Founded: 1956; 70 years ago
- Headquarters: San Antonio, Texas, U.S
- Number of locations: 70
- Area served: Texas, Colorado and Utah
- Key people: Mike Chapman (CEO)
- Services: Savings; Checking; Consumer Loans; Mortgages; Credit cards; Investments; Investments;Title and Insurance
- Total assets: ▲US$13.71 billion (2024)
- Members: 749,576 (2024)
- Number of employees: 1,952 (2024)
- Subsidiaries: Security Service CUSO, LLC; Security Service Title Company, LLC
- Website: ssfcu.org

Security Service Federal Credit Union (SSFCU) is a credit union headquartered in San Antonio, Texas, federally chartered and federally insured by the National Credit Union Administration (NCUA) (excluding its insurance subsidiary). With more than $14 billion in assets, Security Service serves more than 720,000 members, and operates 70 locations in Texas, Colorado and Utah. The credit union is a member of the CU Service Centers shared branching network.

== History ==
Established in 1956 as the United States Air Force Security Service Federal Credit Union, the credit union first opened its doors at Kelly Air Force Base in San Antonio, Texas, with eight members and $25 in deposits. In 1968, the board of directors voted to shorten the credit union’s name to Security Service Federal Credit Union. Headquartered in San Antonio, Texas, Security Service offers a suite of traditional financial products and services.

== Corporate headquarters ==
Security Service Federal Credit Union opened its first corporate headquarters in San Antonio at Hwy 90. Headquarters were then moved in 2001 to a new 128,000 sq. ft. facility located on La Cantera Parkway in San Antonio. Due to continued growth and expansion, Security Service relocated its corporate offices to a new campus located at 15000 IH-10 West in San Antonio, which houses more than 700 employees and offers operations and amenities buildings.

== Mergers and acquisitions ==
Initiated by other credit unions and the National Credit Union Administration (NCUA), mergers and acquisitions have assisted in the expansion of the Security Service Federal Credit Union field of membership. These mergers are also responsible for the credit union’s entry into the Colorado and Utah markets. A merger with the Fort Carson Federal Credit Union in 1980 brought Security Service to Colorado Springs, Colorado. In December 2010, the NCUA approved the credit union’s offer to assume Salt Lake City's Beehive Credit Union's assets, making its first presence in the cities of Salt Lake City, Provo, Riverton, Sandy, South Jordan and St. George, Utah. Since 1974, Security Service has merged and acquired 21 credit unions located in Texas, Colorado and Utah.

== Membership ==
Individuals who live, work, worship, attend school, volunteer, or have a business located in Texas, Colorado, or Utah may qualify for membership. Individuals living in other states may qualify for membership through approved Texas and Colorado consumer councils. A family or household member of an existing member may also qualify for membership.

== Products and services ==
Security Service Federal Credit Union offers financial service, support and products to its members. Products and services that are offered include online and mobile banking, checking and savings accounts, consumer loans, mortgage loans, credit cards, investments, insurance and title services. Other services include shared banking and nationwide ATMs.
