= Peter Pitegoff =

Law professor and Dean of the University of Maine School of Law

Peter R. Pitegoff (born March 6, 1953) is Professor of Law Emeritus and former Dean of the University of Maine School of Law. The focus of his career has been in community-based economic development and legal education.

== Early life and education ==
Peter Pitegoff is a 1975 graduate of Brown University and a 1981 graduate of New York University School of Law, where he was a Root-Tilden scholar. He was born in New York City, grew up in Roslyn, New York, and graduated from Roslyn High School in 1971.

== Early career ==
Pitegoff began his career in the mid-1970s as a community organizer in rural North Carolina and in Oakland, California, following his undergraduate concentration in American civilization and teacher certification for secondary school social studies. After earning his J.D. degree, he served from 1981 to 1988 as general counsel for the ICA Group, a Massachusetts consulting firm that assists community economic development initiatives and worker-owned enterprises nationwide. While in law practice, he taught as an adjunct at New York University School of Law and at Harvard Law School. From 1988 to 2005, he was a law professor at the State University of New York (SUNY) at Buffalo School of Law. At SUNY, he served as vice dean for academic affairs and founded a clinical program in community economic development law, which has been a model for transactional clinics at other law schools. He helped coordinate an organized bar initiative to revise the New York Not-for-Profit Corporation Law and served on the New York State Chief Judge’s Judicial Institute on Professionalism in the Law.

== Maine Law Dean ==
From 2005 to 2015, Pitegoff served as Dean of the University of Maine School of Law (“Maine Law”) in Portland, Maine, a position currently held by Leigh Saufley, former Chief Justice of the Maine Supreme Judicial Court. As Dean, he worked with colleagues to expand Maine Law’s pivotal role in law, policy, economic development, and social justice in Maine and to achieve a higher profile for Maine Law on a national and global stage. He helped to strengthen Maine Law's position within the University of Maine System and to launch Maine Law's effort to relocate to downtown Portland. He served from 2006-2016 on the board of directors of Coastal Enterprises, Inc., a national leader in community development finance. He served as co-chair of Maine’s Juvenile Justice Task Force, and as member of the Merit Selection Committee for the U.S. Magistrate Judge (District of Maine); the Advisory Committee on Legislative Ethics for the Maine House of Representatives; the Clinical Skills Committee of the American Bar Association Section of Legal Education; the Gignoux Inn of Court in Portland; and Maine’s Justice Action Group.

== Teaching, service, and scholarship ==
Following his decade as Dean, Pitegoff remained at Maine Law as a full-time professor through summer 2023, when he earned emeritus status. He has taught law school courses in corporation law, professional responsibility and ethics, economic development law, nonprofit organizations, corporate governance, and employee benefits law. He oversaw the Economic Justice Fellowship program at Maine Law, which provides support and fieldwork opportunities to students with a demonstrated interest in economic justice and community development. He continues to serve on the board of directors of Avesta Housing, a nonprofit developer of affordable housing in Maine and New Hampshire. From 2020 to 2024, he served on the board of directors of the Surf Point Foundation, an arts and artist residency institution in York, Maine. He has been a frequent panelist at a range of conferences and workshops, and served on the Executive Committee of the Association of American Law Schools (AALS) Section on Community Economic Development. Pitegoff has worked and written extensively in the areas of economic development, corporate organization, employee ownership, welfare and labor policy, urban revitalization, and community development finance. His current research focuses on affordable housing policy, community development finance, and economic justice.

== Selected publications ==
- Community Development Finance and Economic Justice, Chapter 4 in FROM THE GROUND UP: LEGAL SCHOLARSHIP FOR THE URBAN CORE (Rashmi Dyal-Chand & Peter D. Enrich, eds.) (Cambridge Univ. Press, 2019).
- Community Development Law, Economic Justice, and the Legal Academy, 26 JOURNAL OF AFFORDABLE HOUSING & COMMUNITY DEVELOPMENT LAW 31 (2017).
- Edmund Muskie's Creative Federalism and Urban Development Today, 67 MAINE LAW REVIEW 252 (2015)
- An Evolving Foreclosure Landscape: The Ibanez Case and Beyond, 5 ADVANCE 131 (2011) (co-authored with Laura Underkuffler).
- The Legacy of Frank M. Coffin, 63 MAINE LAW REVIEW 385 (2011)
- The Market for Change: Community Economic Development on a Wider Stage, in PROGRESSIVE LAWYERING, GLOBALIZATION, AND MARKETS: RETHINKING IDEOLOGY AND STRATEGY (Clare Dalton, ed. 2007).
- Worker Ownership in Enron’s Wake—Revisiting a Community Development Tactic, 8 JOURNAL OF SMALL & EMERGING BUSINESS LAW 239 (2004).
- Shaping Regional Economies to Sustain Quality Work: The Cooperative Health Care Network, in HARD LABOR: WOMEN AND WORK IN THE POST-WELFARE ERA (Joel Handler & Lucie White, eds., 1999).
- Child Care Policy and the Welfare Reform Act, 6 JOURNAL OF AFFORDABLE HOUSING & COMMUNITY DEVELOPMENT LAW 113 (1997) (co-authored with Lauren Breen).
- Unions, Finance, and Labor’s Capital, chapter 5 in UNIONS AND PUBLIC POLICY: THE NEW ECONOMY, LAW AND DEMOCRATIC POLITICS (Lawrence G. Flood, ed., Greenwood Press 1995).
- Law School Initiatives in Housing and Community Development, 4 BOSTON UNIVERSITY PUBLIC INTEREST LAW JOURNAL 275 (1995).
- Urban Revitalization and Community Finance, 27 UNIV OF MICHIGAN JOURNAL OF LAW REFORM 613 (1994).
- Child Care Enterprise, Community Development, and Work, 81 GEORGETOWN LAW JOURNAL (1993).
- Buffalo Change & Community, 39 BUFFALO LAW REVIEW 313 (1991)
- Unions and Worker Ownership, 18 POLICY STUDIES JOURNAL 357 (1990)
- The Democratic Corporation: The New Worker Cooperative Statute in Massachusetts, 11 NEW YORK UNIVERSITY REVIEW OF LAW & SOCIAL CHANGE 441 (1983) (co-authored with David Ellerman).
