= Central Liquidity Facility =

Credit union of the United States

The Central Liquidity Facility (CLF) is a mixed-ownership United States (U.S.) government corporation created to improve the general financial stability of credit unions by serving as a liquidity lender to credit unions experiencing unusual or unexpected liquidity shortfalls. Member credit unions own the CLF which exists within the National Credit Union Administration (NCUA). The President of the CLF manages the facility under the oversight of the NCUA Board.

The Central Liquidity Facility was created by the U.S. Congress in 1998 with the National Credit Union Central Liquidity Facility Act, Subchapter III of the Federal Credit Union Act. The primary purpose of the CLF is to provide loans to credit unions to meet short or long term liquidity needs. It performs the same general functions for credit unions that the Federal Reserve System performs for member banks.

The Central Liquidity Facility is backed by the credit of the U.S. government. The CLF may borrow up to 12 times its subscribed capital stock and surplus (12 USC 1795f(a)(4)(A)).

CLF is organized into five regional branches to serve different states. To become a member, credit unions purchase stock in the Central Liquidity Facility, at an amount equal to 1/2 of 1% of an average of six months of their unimpaired capital and surplus or $50 (whichever is greater).

The Central Liquidity Facility is a 501(c)(1) organization.

== See also ==
- Credit unions
- Corporate credit union
- National Credit Union Administration
- US Central Credit Union
