= Denali. A division of Nuvision Credit Union =

American company

Nuvision Credit Union
- Type: Credit union
- Industry: Financial services
- Founded: 1948
- Headquarters: Huntington Beach, California; United States
- Key people: Roger Ballard CEO
- Products: Savings; checking; consumer loans; mortgages; credit cards
- Total assets: $2.3B USD (Nuvision total, Dec. 31, 2018)
- Members: 184,000 (Nuvision total, Dec. 31, 2018)
- Number of employees: 590 (Nuvision total, April 1, 2019)
- Website: nuvisionfederal.com

Nuvision Credit Union is a credit union based in Huntington Beach, California, United States. The credit union serves communities throughout Alaska, Arizona, California, Wyoming and Washington. It is the third largest credit union in Alaska.

== History ==
The City of Anchorage Employees Federal Credit Union was chartered on December 6, 1948. Charter 5912 was issued by the Bureau of Federal Credit Unions, which was part of the Department of Health, Education, and Welfare, within the Social Security Administration. The Credit Union began with eight members and $40 in assets. The Alaska Railroad Federal Credit Union (Charter 6244), another predecessor to Denali, was chartered in July, 1949, and brought under charter member 5912.

Over the years a number of credit unions were chartered, or merged with existing Alaska credit unions, to create what became Denali Alaskan Federal Credit Union in 1997:

- The Teamsters Federal Credit Union is formed in January, 1964.
- The Anchorage Natural Gas Employees FCU merges with Alaskan Employees FCU in 1975, and the name of the Credit Union was changed to Alaska Municipal Employees FCU (AMEFCU).
- The Chugach Electric Association FCU merged with AMEFCU in 1977.
- The Western Trades FCU merges with AMEFCU in 1982; the subsequent Credit Union changes its name to Alaskan Federal Credit Union in 1984.
- The Alaska Feminist Credit Union merges its field of membership with Alaskan FCU in 1985.
- The Alaska Railroad and Teamster Federal Credit Unions merge to form Denali FCU in 1986.
- Denali and Alaskan Federal Credit Unions merge on January 1, 1997 to form Denali Alaskan Federal Credit Union. The combined assets of the credit union exceed $100 million, and service extends to more than 31,000 members in Alaska and the Lower 48 U.S. states.
- In June, 2015, Denali opened a branch in Kent, Wash., the credit union's first branch outside of Alaska.
- On Jan. 1, 2016, Denali Alaskan dropped "Alaskan" from its name to become Denali Federal Credit Union.
- July 1, 2018, membership is reported at more than 75,000 members and assets of more than $660 million.
- On Oct. 1, 2018, Denali merged with Nuvision Federal Credit Union based in Huntington Beach, Calif. The combined credit unions manage $2.2 billion in assets, 31 branches in California, Alaska, Arizona, Washington and Wyoming, and serve more than 175,000 members. Moving forward, Denali will operate as a division of Nuvision FCU and will be led by Nuvision CEO Roger Ballard.

== NCUA insurance of member accounts ==
As of October 3, 2008, National Credit Union Administration increased member account insurance from the National Credit Union Share Insurance Fund to $250,000 (from $100,000). In May 2009, the member account insurance amount of $250,000 was extended to 2013. On September 27, 2010, the NCUA made permanent the $250,000 limit.
