= USA Federal Credit Union =

Credit union based in San Diego, California

United Services of America Federal Credit Union
- Type: Credit union
- Industry: Financial services
- Founded: 1953
- Successor: Navy Federal Credit Union
- Headquarters: San Diego, California, United States
- Area served: Department of Defense personnel and their families
- Key people: Mary Cunningham, President/CEO; William Fox, Chairman
- Products: Savings; checking; consumer loans; mortgages; credit cards; investments
- Number of employees: 200
- Website: usafed.org

United Services of America Federal Credit Union (often referred to as USA Federal Credit Union or USA Fed) was a credit union headquartered in San Diego, California, chartered and regulated under the authority of the National Credit Union Administration (NCUA) of the U.S. federal government.

As of April 2009, USA Federal Credit Union had over $600 million USD in assets, and over 61,000 members.

USA Fed was one of nineteen credit unions based in San Diego, California.

== History ==
USA Federal Credit Union began in November 1953 with ten members as N.T.C. San Diego Employees Federal Credit Union. The employee-organized federal credit union was initially formed to serve the civilian employees of Naval Training Center San Diego. In 1955, all military personnel working at N.T.C. were added to the field of membership. As the credit union grew, the field of membership expanded internationally allowing for USA Fed's presence in the Pacific Rim.

From 2004 until 2007, the credit union marketed itself as USA Federal, unveiling a unified brand image across printed collateral materials and their online presence.

In 2008, the credit union began promoting the use of the shortened name USA Fed. On March 26, 2010, USA Fed announced to members that their official web site address would be changing to usafed.org.

On September 22, 2010, USA Fed announced plans to merge with Navy Federal Credit Union, stating that joint operations would begin October 4, 2010 under the Navy Federal banner.

== Membership ==
USA Fed's field of membership was set by the NCUA. As with all credit unions, membership in USA Federal is limited to individuals sharing the common bond defined in its credit union charter. Membership in USA Fed is limited to:

- All Department of Defense (DoD) uniformed personnel — Army, Navy, Air Force, Marine Corps and Coast Guard, retirees and annuitants
- All Department of Defense reservists — Army, Navy, Air Force, Marine Corps and Coast Guard, — regardless of drill status — retirees and annuitants
- All Army and Air National Guard personnel — regardless of drill status — civilian employees, retirees and annuitants
- All DoD Officer Candidate programs: midshipmen and cadets at the United States Naval Academy, United States Military Academy, United States Air Force Academy, United States Coast Guard Academy and the United States Merchant Marine Academy; personnel in Officer Candidate programs
- All DoD civilian employees
- U.S. government employees assigned to DoD installations
- DoD contractors assigned to U.S. government installations
- Select Employee Groups (SEGs)
- Family members, including grandparents, parents, spouses, siblings, grandchildren, children (including adopted, foster and stepchildren) and household members

== Organization ==
USA Fed was chartered with NCUA. Like all credit unions, USA Fed was governed by a board of volunteers, elected by and from its membership.

== Services ==
USA Fed offered the typical suite of account services offered by most financial institutions, including savings accounts, checking accounts, IRA accounts, and certificates. The savings product is named "Share Savings" to reflect the fact that a member's initial savings deposit ($5) literally represents their share of ownership in the credit union. USA Fed also offers members consumer loans, credit cards, mortgages and home equity lines of credit, as well as some small business services. USA Fed's Credit Union Service Organization (CUSO), CUSO Financial Services, L.P. (CFS), offers more extensive investment services, online brokerage services, and insurance.

By June 30, 2010, USA Fed closed their Las Vegas, Nevada branch, one of several inherited from another credit union they absorbed years ago, bringing the total branched to 19. As of March 9, 2009, USA Fed has 20 branches and 23 ATMs, located both inside the United States (California and Nevada) and abroad (Japan and Korea).

== Scholarship programs ==
In 1987, the Board of Directors at USA Federal established a Student Scholarship Program awarding five scholarships to college-bound high school seniors.

In 2001, following the untimely death of the USA Federal CEO, the Board renamed the Scholarship Program the Martin P. Cassell Scholarship Program in his honor.

In 2006, the Board of Directors established The CDR Timothy R. McMaster, USN, Scholarship Program in memoriam of a distinguished Board Member who provided 22 years (1984–2006) of volunteer service to USA Federal Credit Union. One scholarship will be awarded to a college-bound high school senior who is the child of an active duty military member.

== Community involvement ==
USA Fed was a long-time supporter of San Diego Fleet Week, where Director of Military Affairs and former prisoner-of-war, Jim Bedinger, has served in several officer positions, including Treasurer for the San Diego Fleet Week Foundation.

Since 2004, USA Fed has been a sponsor of Walk on the Wild Side, an event benefiting the San Diego Zoo.
