= Sacramento Credit Union =

- Type: Cooperative
- Industry: Banking
- Founded: 1935
- Headquarters: Sacramento, California
- Key people: Bhavnesh Makin, President/CEO
- Total assets: $754 million
- Number of employees: 100
- Website: www.sactocu.org

Sacramento Credit Union (SCU) is a full service credit union in Sacramento, California. The credit union was founded in 1935, and is licensed by the State of California and is federally insured up to $250,000 per account by the National Credit Union Share Insurance Fund.

== History ==
Sacramento County Employees' Credit Union opened in 1935 in an abandoned church building located at 715 Seventh Street. Both quarters and staff were shared with the Southern Pacific Employees' Credit Union to reduce operating expenses. At the time, credit unions offered members the services of saving and borrowing money. By 1945, the SCU membership had grown to 289 members, and annual profits were reported as $458.00. In the early 1970s, property was purchased, and the present day main office was constructed at 800 H Street.

The field of membership continued to grow, eventually extending beyond the County of Sacramento employment group, so the company changed its name to Sacramento Credit Union in 1985. Shortly thereafter, SCU was selected by the Sacramento Metro Chamber of Commerce to provide credit union services to their membership.

Sacramento Credit Union is governed by a board of directors that establishes and reviews policy. The Directors are also credit union members, elected by the membership and serving on a voluntary basis. The Supervisory Committee, independent of the Board of Directors, oversees the safety and soundness of the credit union. This committee is elected in the same manner, also serving without pay.

Sacramento Credit Union maintains the standards of a traditional member-owned cooperative while providing modern products and technology. The credit union is a full service financial institution offering personal service through its branch network and the convenience of banking via a vast ATM network, as well as online banking.
