= Cooperative Development Foundation =

- Company type: Charitable organization
- Founded: 1944
- Headquarters: Arlington, Virginia
- Key people: Terry Lewis, chair Steven Thomas, executive director
- Revenue: 3,402,428 United States dollar (2022)
- Total assets: 11,289,391 United States dollar (2022)
- Website: cdf.coop

The Cooperative Development Foundation (CDF) is a 501(c)(3) charitable organization engaged in cooperative development in the United States. CDF administers revolving loan funds, provides grants, and fosters economic development through the formation of cooperatives. CDF is partnered with the National Cooperative Business Association.

== History ==
The Cooperative Development Foundation was founded in 1944 as The Freedom Fund. The organization initially assisted in the development and reconstruction of cooperatives in Europe after World War II. CDF wrote the check that created the Cooperative for American Remittances to Europe which provided economic relief for Europe.

The Freedom Fund changed its name to the Cooperative Development Foundation in the 1980s and turned its focus to domestic cooperative development, though it still supports international efforts.

== Programs ==
CDF administers the Kagawa Fund, a fund providing gap financing to housing cooperatives, and the Jacob Kaplan Fund for the development of senior housing cooperatives. The Howard Bowers Fund provides scholarships for training the staff and boards of food cooperatives.

United Co-op Appeal, CDF's workplace giving program, raises funds for 18 organizations promoting cooperative development with the support of the Nationwide Foundation. Organizations that benefit from the fund include ACDI/VOCA, CHF International, the CDF Fund, Cooperative Development Institute, Cooperative Development Services, the Cooperative Emergency Fund, the Cooperative Fund of New England, the Federation of Southern Cooperatives/Land Assistance Fund, the CooperationWorks! Scholarship Fund, the ICA Group, the MSC Fund, the Jim Jones Fund, the NCBA Fund, the National Network of Forest Practitioners, NRECA International Foundation, Northwest Cooperative Development Center, the Shirley K. Sullivan Fund, and Prospera (formerly the Women's Action to Gain Economic Security).

CDF played a key role in organizing relief efforts by cooperatives following the 9/11 attacks. In the aftermath of the Asian tsunami and Hurricane Katrina, CDF raised close to $200,000 for economic recovery.

CDF also administers the Cooperative Hall of Fame, that annually recognizes individuals who have made outstanding contributions to cooperatives.
