= Denali Alaskan Insurance =

- Industry: Insurance
- Founded: 1983
- Successor: Denali Alaskan Federal Credit Union (May 2003)
- Headquarters: Anchorage, Alaska
- Key people: Robert M. Teachworth
- Services: commercial insurance personal line insurance

Denali Alaskan Insurance is an insurance agency based in Anchorage, Alaska, offering both commercial and personal lines of insurance. The company was first formed as Alaska Business Insurance (ABI) in 1983, selling commercial lines of insurance to its customers. The original owners who founded the company were Wayne Burger and Jim Campbell.

In May, 2003 the company was purchased by Denali Alaskan Federal Credit Union. The president of the Credit Union, Robert M. Teachworth, explained the purchase: "The addition of Denali Alaskan Insurance allows the Credit Union to offer additional services to members and Select Employer Groups".

The Credit Union changed the agency's name from ABI to Denali Alaskan Insurance at the time of the purchase, to reflect the fact that the agency offers both personal lines of insurance, such as home, auto and health insurance, as well as business insurance. Business insurance includes coverage for property, business liability, worker's compensation, builder's risk, professional liability, flood and earthquake, to name a few. They also specialize in commercial and personal aviation accounts and hunting and fishing guides and lodges.

Denali Alaskan Insurance maintained two offices; one at its Anchorage headquarters and one in Eagle River, a community north of Anchorage.

In June, 2011, the Credit Union opened offices of its Insurance and Home Loans business units in the Mat-Su Valley. As a result of this move, the Credit Union closed its Insurance office which had previously been located in Eagle River.

In February 2017, Denali Alaskan Insurance was acquired by Hub International.
