= Air Force Federal Credit Union =

American credit union

Soarion Credit Union
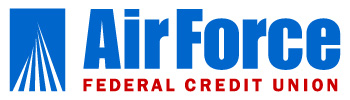
- Company type: Credit union
- Industry: Financial services
- Founded: 1952; 74 years ago
- Products: Savings; checking; consumer loans; mortgages; credit cards; investments; online banking; mobile banking
- Website: soarion.org

Soarion Credit Union, formerly known as Air Force Federal Credit Union (AFFCU), is a US credit union headquartered in San Antonio, Texas, chartered and regulated under the authority of the National Credit Union Administration in 1952. Soarion Credit Union's routing number is 314085504.

== History ==
Soarion Credit Union (Soarion), formerly known as AFFCU, and prior to that as Lackland Federal Credit Union, is a federal credit union that was founded in November 1952 by 10 airmen volunteers. In 1953, it was operating from a one-room office on Lackland Air Force Base. On April 2, 2024, AFFCU changed its name to Soarion Credit Union.

In 2006, Soarion joined the Co-op Financial Services, allowing access to over 30,000 ATMs for no surcharge. In the summer of the following year, Soarion joined the Shared Branching Network. This gave further access to more than 5,400 branches and kiosks domestically and internationally. On January 8, 2024, Soarion ceased participation in the CO-OP ATM and Shared Branching networks. Instead, it emphasized its participation in the Allpoint ATM network.

On June 29, 2012, Soarion changed from a single common bond credit union to a multiple common bond credit union and granted eligibility to members of the Airman Heritage Foundation. In May 2018, Soarion merged with Local 142 Federal Credit Union, a single-office credit union that served members of several local unions. In 2019, the entity opened its first Financial Center outside the state of Texas in Columbus, Mississippi.

As of April 2024, the credit union had more than $663 million in assets, and over 54,000 members worldwide.

== Services ==
Soarion offers online and mobile banking, savings accounts, checking accounts, certificates, consumer loans (personal loans, auto loans, student loans, credit cards, and mortgages). It also offers investment services and related supports, financial planning, and insurance. Soarion offers five scholarships worth $5,000 to high school seniors annually. It is a member of the Allpoint ATM network with over 55,000 surcharge-free machines worldwide.
