= CooperationWorks! =

- Company type: Cooperative
- Industry: Cooperative development
- Founded: 1999
- Headquarters: United States
- Key people: Deb Trocha, Chair
- Revenue: 167,725 United States dollar (2022)
- Total assets: 242,788 United States dollar (2022)
- Website: cooperationworks.coop

CooperationWorks! is a network of organizations promoting rural development through the formation of cooperatives in the United States. CooperationWorks! is organized as a cooperative of 21 member development centers. The co-op facilitates the coordination of cooperative development efforts and provides business expertise to its member organizations.

CooperationWorks! is partnered with the National Cooperative Business Association and the Cooperative Development Foundation.

== History ==
Legislation was signed into law in 1990 authorizing grants to establish a network of rural cooperative development centers throughout the United States. The development centers worked together on an informal basis for nine years. The Madison Principles, a set of standards for cooperative development, were developed in 1995 in Madison, Wisconsin. In February 1999, representatives from nine cooperative development centers on the U.S. met in Denver to found CooperationWorks!

In September 2009, the USDA awarded $2.9 million in grants to 15 members of CooperationWorks! to create jobs and foster economic development in rural communities.

== Members ==
- Arkansas Rural Enterprise Center
- California Center for Cooperative Development
- Common Enterprise Development Corporation
- Cooperative Development Institute
- Cooperative Development Services
- Democracy Collaborative
- Food Cooperative Initiative
- Fund for Democratic Communities
- Indiana Cooperative Development Center
- Iowa Alliance for Cooperative Business Development
- Kentucky Center for Agriculture and Rural Development
- Keystone Development Center
- Latino Economic Development Center
- Mississippi Center for Cooperative Development
- Montana Cooperative Development Center
- North American Students of Cooperation
- National Cooperative Development Association
- National Network of Forest Practitioners
- Nebraska Cooperative Development Center
- North Dakota Rural Electric and Telecommunications Development Center
- Northwest Cooperative Development Center
- Ohio Cooperative Development Center
- Rocky Mountain Farmers Union Cooperative and Economic Development Center
- South Dakota Value Added Agriculture Development Center
