= Dual chartering =

Dual chartering refers to the system by which credit unions in the United States can be chartered under either of two governmental authorities; by either the federal government or by the state government. This system exists because of the Federal Credit Union Act, which Congress passed in 1934.

- Federally chartered credit unions (those with “Federal Credit Union” in their names) are chartered under the authority of the National Credit Union Administration. Federal credit unions insure their members share accounts through the National Credit Union Share Insurance Fund (NCUSIF), which guarantees the safety and soundness of the credit union.
- State chartered credit unions may exist in states that allow for the chartering of financial institutions under the authority of the state. Unlike federally chartered credit unions, state chartered credit unions in some states may choose to insure their assets through either the NCUSIF, or through private insurers such as American Share Insurance (ASI).

== See also ==
- Credit union
- History of credit unions
