= SSFCU =

SSFCU may refer to:

- Security Service Federal Credit Union, a credit union based in Texas
- Suncoast Schools Federal Credit Union, a credit union based in Florida
