= Corporate credit union =

Type of credit union

A corporate credit union, also known as a central credit union, provides services to natural person (consumer) credit unions. In the credit union industry, they are sometimes referred to as "the credit union’s credit union". In the United States, corporate credit unions may either be chartered by the National Credit Union Administration (NCUA), or under state authority if permitted under that state's financial services laws.

Corporate credit unions are owned by the credit unions that choose to do business with them and provide short term (federal funds) and long term investments (in government approved instruments). Corporate credit unions also provide financial settlement services through the clearing of payments (check clearing), ACH (Automated Clearing House), electronic funds transfers (EFT) and ATM transaction services and networks.

Originally, most states operated their own corporate credit union, which had strong ties to the credit union league operating in that state. Many corporate credit unions also provided consumer services to the employees and official family members of credit unions in cases where local or Federal laws prevented people employed by or having an interest in the operation of a financial institution as a means of fraud prevention. The majority of modern corporate credit unions no longer perform a consumer function.

Through the 1980s, the corporate credit union industry underwent a consolidation movement due to limited resources in the face of increasing demands or because of institution failures (ex. CapCorp, a Washington DC–based corporate credit union that failed in the 1990s). There has also been a move by the stronger corporate credit unions to cross state lines and offer their services to credit unions that were previously outside their scope of business.

The largest corporate credit union in the United States was U.S. Central Credit Union. U.S. Central Credit Union and the second largest corporate credit union, Western Corporate Federal Credit Union, were placed in conservatorship by the NCUA on March 20, 2009. On September 24, 2010, NCUA regulators also seized three wholesale credit unions located in Connecticut, Illinois and Texas.

== See also ==
- NCUA Corporate Stabilization Program
- Credit union league
- Credit union service organization
- Reinsurance
