= U.S. Central Credit Union =

American corporate credit union

U.S. Central
- Company type: Corporate credit union
- Industry: Financial services
- Founded: 1974
- Fate: Defunct, after being placed into conservatorship
- Headquarters: Lenexa, Kansas, United States
- Key people: François G. Henriquez, II, President & CEO
- Total assets: $27.116 billion (2008)
- Website: uscentral.coop

U.S. Central Federal Credit Union (commonly abbreviated as USCU and USFCU) was the largest corporate credit union in the United States. Unlike consumer driven credit unions (referred to as "natural person" credit unions in the industry), U.S. Central provided its services only to other corporate credit unions, in effect acting as the "corporate credit union's credit union". The organization was founded in 1974. The organization had to be shut down in 2009 due to the 2008 financial crisis. Eventually, Credit Suisse was forced to pay $400 million to resolve claims that it sold faulty mortgage-backed securities to U.S. Central Federal Credit Union.

U.S. Central did not serve consumers directly, a role fulfilled by consumer credit unions, it was instead established to serve the credit union industry by providing opportunities for investments through government approved instruments and providing liquidity (credit) needs to regional and state corporate credit unions which need them. U.S. Central also provided other industry standard services such as payment systems, electronic funds transfer services and item processing. The organization also provided economic services and forecasts specific to the credit union industry. Many of its operations and services paralleled that of a central bank, except it serves corporate credit unions rather than commercial banks.

U.S. Central Federal Credit Union was located in Lenexa, Kansas.

In January 2009, the National Credit Union Administration injected $1 billion into U.S. Central. On March 20, 2009, NCUA placed U.S. Central Credit Union into conservatorship.

The NCUA was unable to obtain a buyer for the services and began winding down its operations. The credit union was officially shut down October 29, 2012.

== See also ==
- NCUA Corporate Stabilization Program
