= Pentagon Federal Credit Union =

American federal credit union

- Trade name: PenFed Credit Union
- Type: Credit union
- Industry: Financial services
- Founded: 1935; 91 years ago
- Headquarters: 7940 Jones Branch Drive, McLean, Virginia, 22102, United States
- Number of locations: 50
- Area served: Air Force, Army, Coast Guard, Department of Homeland Security, Department of Defense, defense-related companies, the Veterans of Foreign Wars and their families
- Key people: Edward B Cody, Board of Directors Chairman; James Schenck, President and CEO
- Products: Savings; checking; consumer loans; mortgages; credit cards; investments
- Total assets: ▲$34,823,233,611(2023)
- Subsidiaries: Pentagon Federal Credit Union Foundation (dba PenFed Foundation)
- Website: penfed.org

Pentagon Federal Credit Union, widely known by its abbreviated name PenFed, is a United States federal credit union headquartered in McLean, Virginia, chartered and regulated under the authority of the National Credit Union Administration (NCUA). PenFed is the nation's third largest federal credit union, with assets of $34.8 billion and more than 2.8 million members as of December 2023.

The credit union also operates a charitable foundation known as the Pentagon Federal Credit Union Foundation, or more widely the PenFed Foundation that is headquartered in Alexandria, Virginia.

In addition to a variety of loans, savings, and deposit accounts, PenFed also offers credit cards and other financial services.

== Membership ==
Pentagon Federal Credit Union historically had a limited membership to individuals sharing the common bond defined in its credit union charter, mostly membership in organizations related to national defense. In 2018, PenFed acquired the New York-chartered Progressive Credit Union, which had failed due to taxi medallion loans in New York City but which had an open field of membership charter allowing anyone nationwide to join.

A list of some past eligible memberships include the following:

- Active duty members from the U.S. Army, U.S. Navy, U.S. Marine Corps, U.S. Air Force, U.S. Space Force, and U.S. Coast Guard.
- Reserve and National Guard members.
- Retired members of Active Duty, Reserves, and the National Guard.
- Current and retired civilian employees of the Department of Defense.
- Current and retired agents of the Department of Homeland Security
- Current and retired employees of the United States Public Health Service
- Employees and volunteers of the American Red Cross
- Members of the National Military Family Association
- Members of the Air Force Association
- Members of the United States Coast Guard Auxiliary
- Members of the Military Officers Association of America
- Members of Paralyzed Veterans of America
- Members of the United States Army Warrant Officers Association
- Members of the Marine Corps League
- Members of the Navy League of the United States
- Members of the Reserve Officers Association
- Members of Jewish War Veterans of the United States of America
- Members of Veterans of Foreign Wars
- Members of Vietnam Veterans of America
- Pentagon building employees
- Employees of the Transpotomac Plaza or Canal Center in Alexandria, VA
- Individuals who are assigned to, work at, or receive benefits from, any defense or military-based institution
- Family members of those in the field of membership, including: grandparents, parents, spouse, siblings, children (including adopted, foster and stepchildren), grandchildren, and household members
- Family members and employees of Pentagon Federal Credit Union itself

== Competition ==
PenFed is among a few financial services companies that specialize in serving the military—it competes with other military credit unions, such as Navy Federal Credit Union, as well as with some large banks, including Bank of America-Military Bank and USAA.

== Locations ==
Branches are located in the Washington, D.C., area (including Maryland and Virginia); California; Florida; Georgia; Hawaii; Nebraska; New Jersey; New Mexico; New York; North Carolina; Texas; and at military bases in Guam, Japan, Portugal, and Puerto Rico.

Pentagon Federal operates several call centers in Omaha, Nebraska; Papillion, Nebraska; Eugene, Oregon; and San Antonio, Texas.

In 2003, Pentagon Federal joined Allpoint, a surcharge-free network of automated teller machines.

In 2025, Pentagon Federal opened its first branch location on St. Thomas in the US Virgin Islands. Grand opening is scheduled for January 27, 2026.

== Expansion ==
In 2017, Pentagon Federal initiated merger talks with Scranton, Pennsylvania-based Valor Credit Union. Valor reported net losses of $2.4 million and $2.25 million in last year's second and third quarters, which initiated talks of merger with PenFed. The merger was approved by Valor members, and on April 1, 2017, Valor officially merged with PenFed.

On January 1, 2019, an emergency merger took effect and Progressive Credit union merged with PenFed. Progressive Credit Union held taxi medallion loans that led to the credit union's declining revenues. The merger gave PenFed and open charter, allowing anyone nationwide to join the once only military affiliated member credit union.

In February 2019, McGraw-Hill Federal Credit Union announced plans to merge with PenFed, completing to convert customers to those of PenFed on May 1, 2019. The former McGraw-Hill branch in East Windsor, New Jersey, currently operates as a PenFed branch as of September 2019.

In December 2020, Post Office Credit Union in Madison, Wis., voted in favor to merge with PenFed.

In April 2021, due to its deteriorating financial performance Aspire Federal Credit Union in Clark, N.J merged with PenFed. the merger was completed on April 1, 2021, and was originally approved on February 22, 2021, by regulators.

== Corporate Social Responsibility ==
Pentagon Federal Credit Union Foundation
- Trade name: PenFed Foundation
- Type: Subsidiary
- Industry: Foundation (nonprofit)
- Founded: 2001; 25 years ago
- Headquarters: 2930 Eisenhower Ave, Alexandria, Virginia, 22314, United States
- Key people: Deborah Lee James, Chair of the Board of Directors; James Schenck, CEO
- Parent: Pentagon Federal Credit Union (dba PenFed Credit Union)
- Website: penfedfoundation.org

The PenFed Foundation (formally known as the Pentagon Federal Credit Union Foundation) was founded in 2001 by leadership from PenFed Credit Union.

The mission of the PenFed Foundation for Military Heroes is to empower military service members, veterans and their communities with the skills and resources to realize financial stability and opportunity.

The PenFed Foundation has helped more than 140,000 military families since 2001.

In April 2019, four-star retired general John W. “Mick” Nicholson Jr. became president of the PenFed Foundation, serving in this capacity until January 2022.

In March 2020, the PenFed Foundation became the first veteran service organization to launch a COVID-19 emergency relief program open to all service members and veterans and received 6,000 applications in four days.

In June 2020, CNN included PenFed Foundation in its list of nonprofits to support during the COVID-19 pandemic.

The PenFed Foundation was recognized as one of Survey Monkey's top 4 organizations providing COVID-19 relief.

The PenFed Foundation was also honored as the Nonprofit of the Year in July 2020 by the Northern Virginia Chamber of Commerce.

In August 2020, Business Insider recommended PenFed Foundation as one of 8 nonprofits to donate to during the COVID-19 pandemic.

In August 2020, PenFed Foundation was also named a Top 20 Nonprofit Champion by Military Spouse Magazine.
