= Michael Shadid =

Lebanese physician

Michael Shadid

Michael Abraham Shadid (Arabic: مايكل أبراهام شديد 1882 – August 13, 1966) was a Lebanese physician who founded the first medical cooperative in Elk City, Oklahoma, in 1931. He was the first president of the Cooperative Health Federation of America, and an advocate for cooperative health care and preventive medicine.

== Early life ==
Shadid was born in 1882 in Marjayoun, then part of the Mount Lebanon Mutasarrifate in the Ottoman Empire (present-day Lebanon). He was the youngest of 12 children. He attended the American University's high school in Beirut. In 1898 he emigrated to the United States where he was a pack peddler and sold cheap jewelry and buttons door to door.

Shadid attended John Tarleton College in Stephenville, Texas, in 1902 and received a degree in medicine from Washington University in St. Louis in 1907. While in medical school, he joined the Socialist Party of America. He ran for congress as a New Deal Democrat, but was defeated by Sam Massingale.

Shadid married Adeeba Shadid and they had six children: Bess, Fred, Ethel, Alexander, Ruth, and Helen.

== Career ==
In 1923, Shadid left his successful practice in Carter, Oklahoma, and settled in Elk City. He found that farmers of the region did not receive adequate medical care and had no affordable hospital. He called a meeting of his farmer patients and proposed a cooperatively-owned clinic and hospital in Elk City. The Oklahoma Farmers' Union supported the measure and the hospital was opened by the Community Health Association, Inc., in August 1931.

The response from the medical community was icy. Although Shadid had been a member of the Beckham County Medical Society for over 20 years, the society expelled him. The Oklahoma Board of Medical Examiners attempted to revoke Shadid's license, and the Oklahoma State Medical Association tried to get a bill banning medical cooperatives passed in the Oklahoma State Legislature. The bill was defeated with the help of the Oklahoma Farmers' Union. The American Medical Association (AMA) declared that Shadid's cooperative was unethical because it put laypersons in charge of business decisions. The farmers' union took control of the hospital and the health plan in 1934. By 1939, Community Hospital had served 15,000 farmers in southwestern Oklahoma.

== Later life ==
Shadid traveled throughout the United States and Europe and gave speeches advocating for cooperative health care. He helped launch a health co-op in Deer Park, Washington, and assisted the organizing committee that led to the formation of Group Health Cooperative. Shadid helped found the Cooperative Health Federation of America in 1947, serving as the foundation's president from 1947 to 1949. In 1960, he founded Hospital Haramoon in the Lebanese village where he was born.

During the later years of his life, Shadid suffered from diabetes, resulting in the amputation of both legs. He traveled to Russia alone in a wheelchair to lecture on socialized medicine.

Shadid died in Kansas on August 13, 1966, and is buried in Oklahoma City at Fairlawn Cemetery. He was inducted into the Cooperative Development Foundation's Cooperative Hall of Fame in 1978.

== Works ==
- Shadid, Michael (1912). The Self-Physician: Or How to Get Well and Keep Well. Oklahoma City: Oklahoma Pioneer.
- Shadid, Michael Abraham (1939). A doctor for the people; the autobiography of the founder of America's first co-operative hospital. Elk City OK: Vanguard Press. ISBN 9780598920744. LCCN 39027470.
- Shadid, Michael A (1947). Doctors of today and tomorrow ... New York: Cooperative League of the USA. "Poor people get sick quicker, stay sick longer, need medical aid most, get it least. Some are poor because they are sick. Others are sick because they are poor."
- Shadid, Michael (1956). Crusading Doctor: My Fight for Cooperative Medicine. Boston: Meador Publishing Company. ISBN 0-8061-2344-3. LCCN 56001870.
- Michael A. Shadid Papers, Western History Collections, University of Oklahoma, Norman.
