= Value-Added Producer Grants =

US Department of Agriculture programs

The Value-added Producer Grants program was authorized by the Agriculture Risk Protection Act of 2000 and amended by the 2002 farm bill (P.L.107-171, Sec. 6401). The farm bill authorizes $40 million per year in grants for the development and marketing of value-added agricultural products, including organic agricultural production. Eligible applicants are independent producers, farmer and rancher cooperatives, agricultural producer groups, and majority-controlled producer-based business ventures.
