= Ed Callahan =

American civil servant (1929–2009)

Chairman, National Credit Union Administration
- In office October 1981 – May 3, 1985
- Preceded by: Lawrence Connell
- Succeeded by: Roger W. Jepsen

Personal details
- Born: March 23, 1929 Youngstown, Ohio
- Died: March 18, 2009 (aged 79) Sacramento, California
- Spouse: Linda Callahan
- Children: Eight
- Education: Marquette University
- Profession: Catholic educator, credit union CEO

Edgar F. Callahan (March 23, 1929 – March 18, 2009) was an American civil servant, who served as Chairman of the National Credit Union Administration (NCUA) under President Ronald Reagan from 1981 to 1985.

== Early life and career ==
Born in Youngstown, Ohio, Callahan graduated from Ursuline High School in 1946. He went on to play college football at Marquette University in Milwaukee, Wisconsin, where he received a bachelor's degree in mathematics in 1951 and a master's degree in educational administration in 1952.

From 1970 - 1975, Callahan was principal of Boylan Catholic High School, and in 1971 he became the first superintendent of the Rockford Area Catholic Schools. Prior to this, Callahan served a variety of positions at Boylan, including the first athletic director, first head coach in football, basketball, and chair of the mathematics department.

In 1975, Callahan became the Assistant Secretary of State for Illinois under Secretary Michael Howlett.

Immediately prior to his presidential appointment, Callahan served as director of the Illinois Department of Financial Institutions under Governor James R. Thompson. As director, he was responsible for the supervision of 2,000 consumer finance companies, 1,200 currency exchanges, and 1,000 Illinois-chartered credit unions.

== Chairman of the NCUA ==
In 1981, President Ronald Reagan appointed Callahan as Chairman of the National Credit Union Administration, which made him the highest-ranking credit union regulator in the country.

As chairman of the NCUA, Callahan was one of the president's key advisors on domestic economic policy. He is credited with guiding the credit union movement into deregulation, allowing it to take flight.

Callahan made three key decisions while at the helm of the NCUA: to deregulate saving and loan rates, to allow a credit union to serve multiple ‘groups’ with a common bond (which allowed membership in credit unions to grow exponentially since), and to challenge credit unions to capitalize their own share insurance fund. As a result of these decisions, many feel he single-handedly saved the U.S. credit union movement.

== Private sector career ==
After leaving the NCUA, Callahan went on to found Callahan & Associates in Washington, DC, the nation's leading provider of independent financial data concerning credit unions in the United States. The group publishes Callahan's Credit Union Report, which is a monthly publication that focuses on strategic concepts, thought-provoking ideas, and trends in the credit union industry. Callahan & Associates also seeks to promote the industry by facilitating cooperative endeavors among the nation's credit unions.

Callahan later became CEO of the San Francisco-based Patelco Credit Union. Due in large part to Callahan's leadership, Patelco grew from a regional credit union with $280 million in assets to a national one with more than $3.0 billion when he retired in 2002. Today, Patelco is currently the 14th largest credit union in America, with $4.2 billion in assets.

== Awards and accolades ==
Among the many accolades that Callahan was awarded, he was inducted into the Cooperative Hall of Fame in 2000 and was awarded the Wegner Lifetime Achievement Award in 2003 by the Credit Union National Association, which is the highest national honor given in the credit union industry.

At Callahan's retirement party on October 19, 2002, it was announced that more than $100 million had been pledged in his honor by the nation's credit unions to a newly created program, the Callahan Fund, at the National Credit Union Foundation. Proceeds from the investments of the fund support grant requests in the areas of cooperative development and financial literacy.

== Death and legacy ==
Callahan died on March 18, 2009, in Sacramento, California.

At his funeral on March 27, 2009, at the Cathedral of the Blessed Sacrament in Sacramento, it was announced that the Edgar F. and Kathleen M. Callahan Memorial Fund has been established at Marquette University in honor of him and his late daughter, Kathleen.
