= Albert McKnight =

American author, activist, and priest

The Reverend Albert J. McKnight CsSp
- Church: Catholic Church

Personal details
- Born: August 18, 1927 Brooklyn, New York
- Died: April 17, 2016 (aged 88) Bethel Park, Pennsylvania
- Parents: Albert and Althea McKnight
- Occupation: Pastor, activist, and author
- Education: St Mary's Seminary, Norwalk

Albert J. McKnight, CsSp (August 18, 1927 – April 17, 2016) was an author, activist, Black Catholic priest and member of the Spiritans known for his advocacy for Black liberation and cooperative economics.

He was the principal organizer of the Southern Cooperative Development Fund (SCDF), Southern Development Foundation (SDF), and the Southern Consumers Cooperative (SCC). In 1968, Ebony magazine described him as having staged "a peaceful economic revolution." McKnight’s work with cooperatives and on behalf of impoverished black communities in the South was legendary, ultimately organizing over 2,000 low-income citizens in cooperatives throughout the South, mostly in Louisiana.

== Biography ==
=== Early life and education ===
Born in Brooklyn on August 18, 1927, to Albert and Althea Holmes McKnight, the younger McKnight converted to Catholicism as a child, with his mother being a Methodist and his father a lapsed Catholic. He later entered the Congregation of the Holy Spirit in the 1940s as one of the nation's earliest Black Catholic male religious. He professed first vows at the Holy Ghost Novitiate in Ridgefield, Connecticut, and was ordained to the priesthood on June 6, 1952, at St Mary's (Ferndale) Seminary in Norwalk, Connecticut.

=== Priesthood ===
His first parish assignment was in 1957 at St Paul Catholic Church in Kaplan, Louisiana, where he observed rampant illiteracy and implemented counteractive measures. He then traveled to Nova Scotia in 1960 to attend classes on co-operative economics at the Coady Institute. Subsequently, he founded the Southern Consumers Cooperative (SCC), a network of Southern Black farmers.

==== Holy Ghost Catholic Church ====
After returning to Kaplan, McKnight served at various other parishes before being assigned to Holy Ghost Catholic Church in Opelousas, Louisiana, where he gained considerable fame as the SCC grew. Soon other developments emerged, including the Acadian Delight cooperative bakery, which received a $25,000 loan from President Lyndon Johnson's War on Poverty program. An ardent activist, McKnight also attended the March on Washington for Jobs and Freedom in 1963.

At Holy Ghost, McKnight also became known for his religious activism, emerging as a notable advocate of the Black Catholic Movement. He played a pivotal role as a founding member of the National Black Catholic Clergy Caucus (in which he would serve as the first executive director). He began a program of Black inculturation at Holy Ghost, including the removal of Eurocentric images and music, and replacing them with Black saints, gospel music, and the Black preaching idiom. He also helped develop the NBCCC's founding manifesto, which famously claimed that "The Catholic Church in the U.S. is primarily a White, racist institution.” He would later take part in the NBCCC's agitations for an African-American Catholic rite.

==== Cooperative economics ====
Meanwhile, he created the Southern Cooperative Education Fund (SCEF), which in 1967 received a half a million dollars to spread cooperative economics through the South. His new Southern Cooperative Development Fund (SCDF) received another half-million dollar grant from the Ford Foundation in 1969, which McKnight helped turn into a $30M operation with various subsidiary coops.

"Over a 25-year period, [McKnight] was in the vanguard of organizing 75 cooperatives, credit unions and minority businesses across the Southern United States."

McKnight was profiled in Ebony magazine in 1968, as he began advocating not only for economic uplift but political action as well. At the time, few African Americans had ever run for office, and McKnight became one of the first himself while encouraging others to also start their own campaigns. His activism against racism and economic oppression resulted in at least two arrests.

In 1969, McKnight and his collaborators received an invitation from Histadrut, a labor organization in Israel, to come observe their kibbutzes communities and collectivized farms (moshavim). McKnight, upon his return to the States, began mentoring a young Ronald Mason Jr., who would later go on to practice law and head a number of Black universities. With McKnight, he headed a number of subsidiaries within the larger Southern coop movement established by McKnight—including the new collective farms created under the Israeli model.

The farms would not survive long as a unified operation, due to various disputes. Likewise, several of the cooperative operations would not last beyond McKnight's period of direct influence. Controversy concerning how to spend grant funds split the leadership of the SCDF in the 1970s, and McKnight left coop activity entirely for a number of years thereafter.

In the late 1970s, President Jimmy Carter appointed McKnight to the board of the newly established National Cooperative Bank. Around the same time, he organized the first Zydeco festival in Louisiana, and his cooperative network provided the loan that helped establish the jazz and funk radio station WWOZ in New Orleans.

==== Return to Holy Ghost ====
After several years of economic work and activism, McKnight returned full-time to Holy Ghost in 1982, with the church having more than 10,000 members—making it the largest Black Catholic parish in the United States. His continued insistence on inculturation and activistic anti-racism led some Black parishioners to leave the parish, and prominent White citizens to protest to the local Church hierarchy. In 1987, when the local school board threatened to close a historically Black school, McKnight hosted 1,000 local African Americans to discuss the issue at Holy Ghost. They received a bomb threat, and the successful meeting was aired on CBS News's evening broadcast with Dan Rather. A later protest at the school board offices resulted in the arrest of McKnight and others, with McKnight being charged with incitement.

In 1988, Bishop Gerard Louis Frey controversially forced McKnight out of the parish, after the Spiritans gave the ultimatum that they would leave the diocese if this occurred. McKnight would later state that the episode threatened his religious career and he considered leaving the priesthood. Instead, he received support from his religious order's leaders and decided to remain a priest; nevertheless, he began growing his beard "until [he] received justice" from the diocese. The Holy Ghost Fathers would ultimately cede Holy Ghost Church and their other local parishes to the Society of the Divine Word.

==== Haiti ====
McKnight then moved into a nearby home with his ailing mother, before departing to Haiti to continue working. He later returned stateside and served as novice director for his province of the Spiritans. He asked to retire, again to Haiti, in 2005. There, he had helped establish a college the year prior, today known as the University of Fondwa.

=== Later life and death ===
He returned to the states in 2012 and was in residence in California and Pennsylvania before his death in 2016 at the age of 88. He was funeralized at Holy Ghost in Opelousas and buried at Assumption Catholic Cemetery in Carencro, Louisiana.

== Legacy ==
McKnight was inducted into the Cooperative Hall of Fame in 1987, while he was still living, and he received an honorary doctorate from Duquesne University, a school run by his religious order, in 1993.

He was honored upon his death by the Louisiana House of Representatives, and the NBCCC annually bestows the Albert McKnight Award to an exemplary Black Catholic priest in his honor.

== Works ==
- "Whistling in the Wind"
- "Black Christian Perspectives of Spirituality" (Black and Catholic, Catholic and Black : Readings, Resources, and Family Activities)
