= Ohio Credit Union System =

The Ohio Credit Union System is an Ohio-based American trade association for credit unions. The Ohio Credit Union System is composed of the Ohio Credit Union League (a credit union league), the Ohio Credit Union Foundation (a non-profit organization), OCULPAC (a lobbying organization), and OCUL Services Corp., a service & solutions supplier for credit unions. OCUS credit unions have over 2.6 million members and $16.9 billion in deposits and include both federal credit unions and credit unions chartered by Ohio.

OCUS is governed by a board of directors elected by its member credit unions. OCUS headquarters have been in Cincinnati, Ohio (1934-1945), Columbus, Ohio (1945-1998), Dublin, Ohio (1998-2008), and moved back to Columbus, Ohio, in 2008. Under OCUS, the State of Ohio is divided into thirteen chapters, with affiliated credit unions assigned to the chapters based on their geographic location.

In 2006, OCUS entered a four-year partnership with World Council of Credit Unions (WOCCU) and Bolivian credit unions. The partnership seeks to create an electronic banking network in Bolivia with funding from USAID Bolivia. Employees of the Ohio Credit Unions are providing expertise and sharing technologies with Bolivian credit unions.

The Ohio Credit Union Foundation (OCUF) funds financial literacy programs and disaster relief efforts. The foundation granted $60,000 to the PBS television program Biz Kid$.
