= Cooperative Development Services =

- Company type: Nonprofit organization
- Founded: 1985
- Headquarters: Madison, Wisconsin; St. Paul, Minnesota
- Key people: Kevin Edberg, Executive Director; Gary Sloan, Chair
- Website: cdsus.coop

Cooperative Development Services (CDS) is a nonprofit organization engaged in cooperative development in the United States. CDS works primarily with food cooperatives and senior housing cooperatives, providing consultation services and co-sponsoring conferences and programs for board members, managers and other professionals in the cooperative sector.

CDS has staff in Madison, Wisconsin and St. Paul, Minnesota and is run by a 12-member board of directors.

== History ==
Cooperative Development Services was founded in 1985 by Rod Nilsestuen.

== Programs ==
Cooperative Board Leadership Development (CBLD) is a program providing support to the boards of food cooperatives. CBLD works with cooperatives to help define the role that Boards play in relation to staff.

Policy Governance is a system of board leadership that distinguishes between governance and management responsibilities. It is designed to provide management with authority while maintaining accountability for performance.

=== Forestry cooperatives ===
Cooperative Development Services assists in the development of sustainable forestry cooperatives and associations. Since 1998, CDS has been involved in the formation of 25 forestry cooperatives. CDS has received nearly $1 million in grant assistance from the USDA's rural cooperative development grants program. CDS is a founding partner in WoodWorks, a network of organizations that provide services to forestry cooperatives.

=== Food Co-op 500 ===
Food Co-op 500 is a program to increase the number of food cooperatives in the United States to 500 by 2015. As of 2009, there were approximately 300 food cooperatives in operation. The program is supported by CDS along with the National Cooperative Grocers Association and the National Cooperative Bank. CDS offers free outlines detailing the seven steps in forming a cooperative.

=== Renewable energy ===
CDS assists organizations with founding businesses and funding projects in the renewable energy industry. CDS has helped organizations with projects involving biodiesel and wind energy.

=== Value-added agriculture ===
CDS works with agricultural and livestock businesses to create revenue through value-added products. The organization assists businesses in obtaining grants such as the Value-Added Producer Grants available through the USDA.
