= National Credit Union Administration v. First National Bank & Trust Co. =

NCUA v. First National Bank & Trust
- Supreme Court of the United States

Argued October 6, 1997 Decided February 25, 1998
- Full case name: National Credit Union Administration v. First National Bank & Trust Co. et al.
- Citations: 522 U.S. 479 (more) 118 S. Ct. 927; 140 L. Ed. 2d 1

Case history
- Prior: First Nat. Bank & Tr. Co. v. Nat'l Credit Union Admin., 772 F. Supp. 609 (D.D.C. 1991), reversed, 988 F.2d 1272 (D.C. Cir. 1993); cert. denied, 510 U.S. 907 (1993); on remand, 863 F. Supp. 9 (D.D.C. 1994); reversed, 90 F.3d 525 (D.C. Cir. 1996); cert. granted, 519 U.S. 1148 (1997).
- Subsequent: None

Holding
- Respondents have standing under the APA to seek review of the NCUA's interpretation of disputed statute because their claim was within the "zone of interest" of the statute.

Court membership
- Chief Justice William Rehnquist Associate Justices John P. Stevens · Sandra Day O'Connor; Antonin Scalia · Anthony Kennedy; David Souter · Clarence Thomas; Ruth Bader Ginsburg · Stephen Breyer

Case opinions
- Majority: Thomas, joined by Rehnquist, Kennedy, Ginsburg; Scalia (except as to footnote 6)
- Dissent: O'Connor, joined by Stevens, Souter, Breyer

Laws applied
- Federal Credit Union Act

National Credit Union Administration v. First National Bank & Trust Co., 522 U.S. 479 (1998), is a 1998 legal case in which the Supreme Court of the United States ruled that banks had prudential standing to challenge regulations that permitted credit unions to enroll unaffiliated members.

== Background ==
The case involves the Federal Credit Union Act, which limits federal credit union membership to “groups having a common bond of occupation or association, or to groups within a well-defined neighborhood, community or rural district.” There are three permitted types of common bonds: occupational, associational, and community. Until 1982, federal credit unions formed along occupational lines consisted of the employees of one employer. In 1982, NCUA announced a multiple group occupational credit union policy that resulted in large, interstate, credit unions that offer banks competition for consumer products and services.

Because of their mutual form of ownership, credit unions are not subject to corporate taxes. Banks argue that since credit unions do not pay taxes, they may offer consumer banking products at prices lower than banks and thrifts. Credit unions do not come under the requirements of the Community Reinvestment Act, 12 U.S.C. §§ 2901 -2906, as they solely lend to their membership.

== Opinion of the Court ==
The Court affirmed First National Bank and Trust Company v. National Credit Union Administration which had remanded the case to the district court. This meant that, without legislation changing the language of the statute, a broad order could have been issued enjoining the admission of members to any federal occupational credit union who did not share the original single common bond of occupation. All parties to the suit, however, asked the court to delay acting while Congress considered legislation. Without legislation, it was feared that many of the large credit unions already in existence would face the likelihood that their stream of new members would slow to a trickle and, thus, their long term viability prospects diminish.

== Subsequent developments ==
P.L. 105-219 contains clauses to preserve all existing multiple bond arrangements and permit new members to be added to all current groups. It includes provisions to curb future growth of multiple-group credit unions—instructions to NCUA with respect to chartering single groups where possible and providing geographic components to affiliations. Groups of more than 3,000 would generally not be permitted to affiliate with an existing credit union. Multiple group credit unions could extend their membership to persons and organizations located within areas underserved by other depository institutions. From the Senate-reported version (S.Rept. 105-193), capital standards are prescribed—7% of net worth for a well-capitalized credit union—and a cap is placed on commercial loans—1.75% of net worth. This limits the total amount of member business loans over $50,000 that a well-capitalized credit union may carry to 12.25% of net worth.

Also from the version reported by the Senate Banking Committee, a sequence of prompt corrective actions is prescribed for implementation as a federally insured credit union's net worth declines below prescribed levels. There are also new auditing procedures and voting requirements for a credit union to convert to a bank or thrift charter.

The legislation mandates studies on the differences between the regulatory and tax treatment accorded credit unions and other federally insured financial institutions. It requires the federal banking agencies to detail their progress in efforts to streamline regulatory burdens. It also imposes a requirement that the Secretary of the Treasury recommend, within one year, legislative and administrative action to reduce and simplify the tax burden on small banking institutions: insured depository institutions having less than $1 billion in assets and banks having total assets between $1 and $10 billion.

== See also ==
- List of United States Supreme Court cases, volume 522
- List of United States Supreme Court cases
- Lists of United States Supreme Court cases by volume
