= ICA Group =

The ICA Group is an American not-for-profit entity specializing in consulting organizations wishing to become fully owned by the employees. The organization has a reliable work history with the NCBA. While ICA primarily provides consultation to worker cooperatives, it also offers support to employee stock ownership plans (ESOPs).

Note it should not be confused with another company of the same name, The ICA Group, a group of investors headed by Mr Ali Nawaz Shaikh.
