= Bureau of Federal Credit Unions =

United States federal agency (1934–1970)

Agency overview
- Formed: 1934
- Superseding agency: National Credit Union Administration
- Jurisdiction: Federal government of the United States

The Bureau of Federal Credit Unions was a federal agency in the United States that supervised and chartered federal credit unions from 1934 until 1970. The Bureau was created through the Federal Credit Union Act as part of the New Deal. It was self-financing and did not receive appropriations from general Treasury funds. In 1970, the Bureau was replaced by the National Credit Union Administration (NCUA).

== History ==
On June 26, 1934, President Franklin D. Roosevelt signed the Federal Credit Union Act into law as part of the New Deal. The Act sought to promote thrift in the aftermath of the Great Depression and allowed the establishment of federally chartered credit unions in the United States as part of the Federal Credit Union System.

Responsibility for administration of the Act shifted several times over the years. Initially, the Farm Credit Administration was responsible. Administration of the Act was transferred to the Federal Deposit Insurance Corporation (FDIC) in 1942 under Executive Order 9148. On June 29, 1948, Public Law 813 transferred administrative responsibility of the Act to the Federal Security Agency, which established the Bureau of Federal Credit Unions in the Social Security Administration. The Bureau migrated to the Department of Health, Education, and Welfare in 1953. By 1962, the Bureau regulated more than 21,000 federally chartered credit unions with assets equal to $3.43 billion.

During the Johnson administration, the Bureau conceived of and implemented Project Moneywise, a training program for community leaders in impoverished areas that taught money management alongside cooperative and credit union organization. The Project was funded by a $125,000 grant from Office of Economic Opportunity as a part of the War on Poverty.

In March 1970, as the number of credit unions in the U.S. approached 24,000, oversight of credit unions was transferred to the National Credit Union Administration (NCUA), an independent federal agency.

== See also ==
- Credit union
- Federal Credit Union Act
- National Credit Union Administration
