= Credit union service organization =

Credit union service organizations (CUSOs) are United States corporate entities that are owned by federally insured credit unions and provide services to them. These are often used by credit unions to share common services between several credit unions to create economies of scale. The services are limited by regulation but include administrative, professional, management and technology services.

Under US federal law and the National Credit Union Administration regulations Part 712, federally chartered credit unions may make an investment in or a loan to a CUSO. Aggregate investments in CUSOs by federally chartered credit unions may not exceed 1% of paid in and unimpaired capital, and aggregate loans to CUSOs may not exceed 1% of paid in and unimpaired capital. (State chartered credit unions will follow state law and, in some instances, these limitations may be different.)

Every CUSO must be subject to a legal opinion to ensure the proposed structure is permissible and does not engage in unauthorized activities and to ensure that potential liabilities are limited to the funds invested or loaned to it. Furthermore, every CUSO must explicitly allow the National Credit Union Administration the right to review its books and records, which must be maintained according to GAAP.

== Permitted services ==
Credit unions may only invest or make a loan to CUSOs that primarily serve credit unions and credit union members and that perform a permitted service. The permitted services fall into several categories which are delineated in the regulation and include checking and currency services, clerical, professional and management services, business loan origination, consumer mortgage origination, electronic transaction services, financial counseling services, fixed asset services, insurance brokerage or agency, leasing, loan support services, record retention, security and disaster recovery services, securities brokerage services, student loan origination, trust agency services, real estate brokerage services, credit card loan origination, and payroll processing services.

A CUSO in the US may be organized as a corporation, a limited liability corporation (LLC) or as a limited partnership (LP), where the credit union participating as a limited partner only. Credit unions are not authorized to be general partner. No matter which organizational form is used, the liability of the credit union owners must be limited to their investment. Due to the flexibility and favorable tax treatment, LLCs are the most common organizational entity.

== Risk management ==
The usual method of splitting profits and loss is based on the percentage of ownership. However, many credit unions, using an old co-operative tradition, reward the users of the CUSO services by providing incentives to the owners to use them. CUSOs providing operational services use a tiered pricing structure that rewards heavy usage. In CUSOs providing financial services, return is sometimes based on the volume of business that is generated by members. There can be a pay or play component where a credit union that is a heavy user of the CUSO services contributes less capital or lower fees.

== Purpose ==
CUSOs are formed for all sorts of reasons. They can provide avenues for innovation and creativity that would not typically occur within the confines of a credit union. They can provide a revenue stream for credit unions that would not be available within the confines of a credit union. They can reduce service costs incurred within the traditional credit union. Some may do all three. Generally, these outcomes are the result of collaboration and the cooperative spirit that is inherent in the credit union industry.

Collaborating in CUSOs allows credit unions to capitalize on these outcomes and provide good member services. It gives the ability to provide better service, cheaper service, and new services that credit unions may not be able to provide. For example, not all credit unions have the capital to gain the expertise to originate business and commercial real estate loans. But, if several credit unions pool their resources they can afford to hire the right individuals and in turn provide a valuable service to their members.

== See also ==
- Corporate credit union
- Credit union league
