= Federal Credit Union Act =

1934 U.S. law establishing a national credit union system

- Acronyms (colloquial): FCUA

Codification
- U.S.C. sections created: 12 USC § 1751 et al.
- Agencies affected: National Credit Union Administration

Legislative history
- Signed into law by President Franklin D. Roosevelt on 26 June 1934

United States Supreme Court cases
- National Credit Union Administration v. First National Bank & Trust Co., 522 U.S. 479 (1998)

The Federal Credit Union Act is an Act of Congress enacted in 1934. The purpose of the law was to make credit available and promote thrift through a national system of nonprofit, cooperative credit unions. This Act established the federal credit union system and created the Bureau of Federal Credit Unions, the predecessor to the National Credit Union Administration, to charter and oversee federal credit unions. The general provisions in the Federal Act were based on the Massachusetts Credit Union Act of 1909, and became the basis of many other state credit union laws. Under the provisions of the Federal Credit Union Act, a credit union may be chartered under either federal or state law, a system known as dual chartering, which is still in existence today.

Credit union law in the U.S. built on earlier legislation such as that developed by Franz Hermann Schulze-Delitzsch in Germany and Alphonse Desjardins in Canada. Among the individuals responsible for formulating credit union legislation in the United States were Edward Filene, Pierre Jay and Roy Bergengren.

The Act is amended periodically to evolve and remain a modern credit union law. This contemporary law, coupled with the NCUA Board's commitment to reduce regulatory burden, enables federal credit unions to offer a variety of services to meet the financial needs of their members. For example, in addition to basic passbook share, many federal credit unions offer share drafts, share certificates, and credit cards.

Federal credit unions organized and operated in accordance with the Federal Credit Union Act are considered entities of the United States government and are tax-exempt under 501(c)(1).

== See also ==
- History of credit unions
