= Credit Union Service Centers =

Organization of credit unions

Credit Union Service Centers (commonly known as shared branching) is an organization of credit unions that allows members of participating credit unions to process transactions at any participating branch. Members are generally free to conduct normal transactions and day-to-day operations away from their home branch. As of November 2023, the network included 5,700 participating locations. While mostly composed of US-based credit unions, the network is international. Shared branches are useful for domestic or international traveling, changing credit unions, and using a credit union that is closer to a customer than their own branch.

== Transactions ==
The types of transactions that can be done at a shared branch can vary. Some may have fees based on an established schedule. The types of transactions generally available to customers include:

- Deposits
- Withdrawals
- Loan payments
- Making transfers between accounts
- Purchasing money orders, traveller's checks, and official checks

== Restrictions ==
Shared branches do not act as replacements for a customer's own branch. Different branches have some restrictions on what cannot be done at that branch. The most common restrictions include:

- Opening or closing accounts
- Applying for loans or credit cards
- Changing customer account information
- Potentially complex transactions
- Resolving issues with a transaction
