= National Credit Union Share Insurance Fund =

Provides deposit insurance to protect the accounts of credit union members

The National Credit Union Share Insurance Fund provides deposit insurance to protect the accounts of credit union members at federally insured institutions in the United States. Created in 1970, the Share Insurance Fund is administered by the National Credit Union Administration, an independent federal financial regulator. The Share Insurance Fund is funded completely by participating credit unions, and not one penny of insured savings has ever been lost by a member of a federally insured credit union. The Share Insurance Fund is backed by the full faith and credit of the United States government.

As of December 2016, Share Insurance Fund insured an estimated $1 trillion in member shares in more than 5,800 federally insured credit unions.

== Funding, premiums and dividends ==
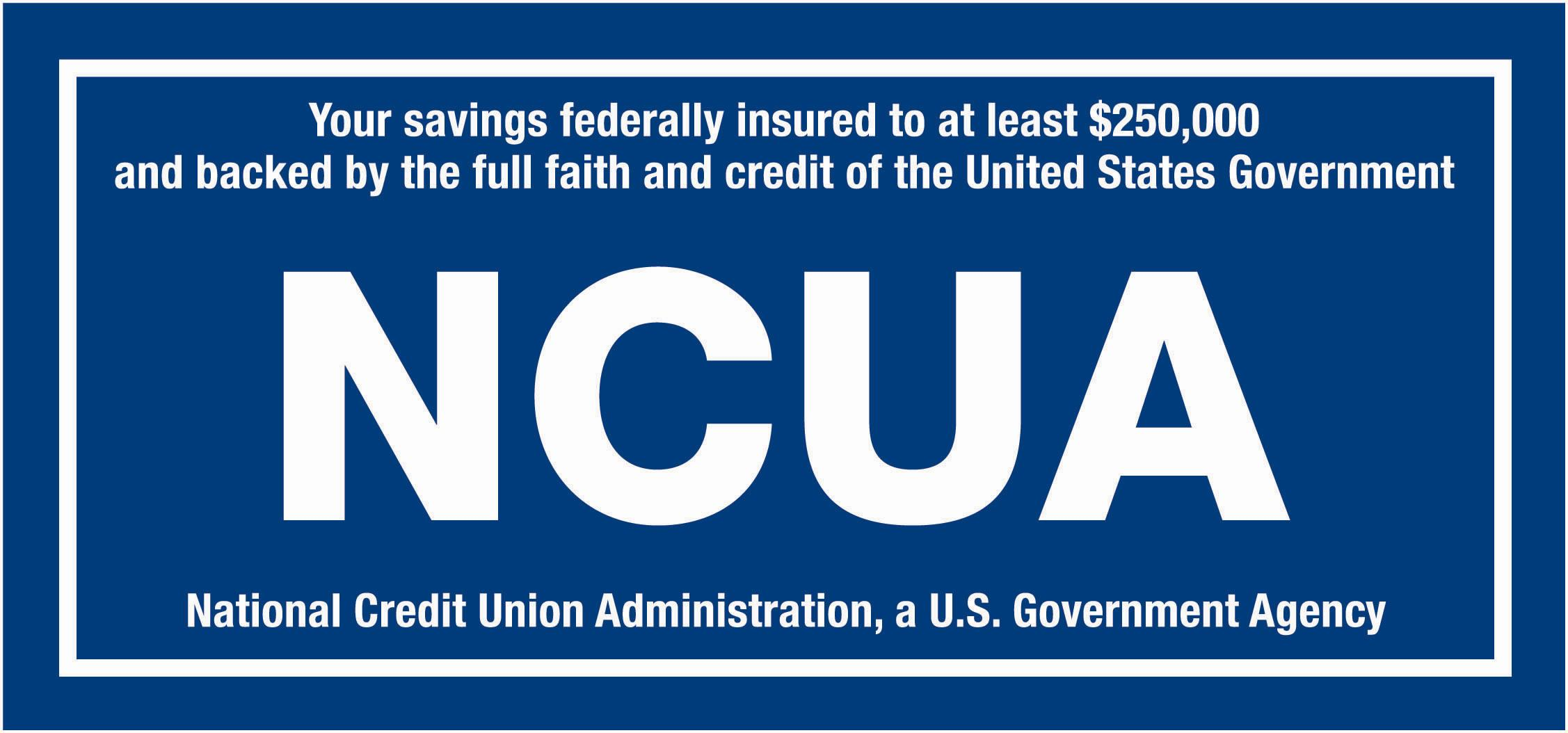
This sign, displayed at all insured credit unions, informs members that their savings are insured by the NCUA.

In 1970, Congress, approved, and then President Richard M. Nixon signed, Public Law 91-206, creating the National Credit Union Administration as an independent federal financial regulator. Soon after, Congress established the National Credit Union Share Insurance Fund and made NCUA responsible for its administration.

As of December 31, 2025, the Share Insurance Fund had $24.1 billion in total assets and $18.3 billion in contributed capital. Each federally insured credit union is required to deposit and maintain 1 percent of its insured shares in the fund. The Federal Credit Union Act requires the NCUA Board to set a target equity ratio of at least 1.20 percent and no more than 1.50 percent of total insured deposits. It is NCUA Board policy that the normal operating equity ratio is 1.30 percent.

The majority of the fund is invested in United States treasury securities, with a portion of the earnings being used to fund NCUA's operations. NCUA gets about $200 million of its current budget from the Share Insurance Fund, with the remainder coming from operating fees charged to regulated credit unions.

In the event that the equity ratio of the fund falls below 1.20 percent, the Federal Credit Union Act requires the NCUA Board to charge credit unions a premium or to develop and implement a restoration plan for the fund. The NCUA Board has discretion whether to charge a premium when the equity ratio is between 1.20 percent and 1.30 percent.

NCUA has assessed a Share Insurance Fund premium three times since the Fund was recapitalized in 1984: 1991, 2009 and 2010.

== NCUSIF insured accounts ==
The Share Insurance Fund protects members' accounts in federally insured credit unions in the event of a credit union failure. The fund insures the balance of each members' account, dollar-for dollar, up to the standard maximum share insurance amount of $250,000. NCUA insurance covers all types of member shares received by a credit union including:

- Share draft accounts (aka "checking accounts").
- Share savings that can be added to or withdrawn from at any time.
- "Money market share" accounts, essentially high-interest share savings accounts (the name is similar to "money market funds" which are not insured).
- Share certificates (CDs), which generally require funds be kept in the account for a set period.
- Outstanding Cashier's Checks, Interest Checks, and other negotiable instruments drawn on the accounts of the credit union.

NCUA publishes a variety of resources for consumers to better understand insurance coverage on their deposits at federally insured credit unions, including:

- The Share Insurance Estimator, NCUA's interactive site which allows users to input data to compute the amount of Share Insurance Fund coverage available under different account scenarios, and
- NCUA's share insurance publications How Your Accounts Are Federally Insured and Your Insured Funds. Both publications are available in English and Spanish.
- A three-part YouTube series designed to educate depositors about the protection offered by the National Credit Union Share Insurance Fund.

The Share Insurance Fund also provides funding when a credit union is no longer able to continue operating, the credit union will be liquidated and the NCUSIF will pay member shares up to $250,000.

Since the passage of the Federal Deposit Insurance Reform Act of 2005 deposits were insured for up to $100,000 per insured account, or $250,000 for certain retirement accounts.

The standard share insurance limit was temporarily raised from $100,000 to $250,000 in October 2008, initially through December 31, 2009. In May 2009, that temporary increase was extended through December 31, 2013. This increase was made permanent by the Dodd–Frank Wall Street Reform and Consumer Protection Act in July 2010.
