= National Credit Union Administration =

Independent U.S. federal agency for insuring credit unions

- Official seal

Agency overview
- Formed: March 10, 1970
- Preceding agency: Bureau of Federal Credit Unions
- Jurisdiction: Federal government of the United States
- Headquarters: Alexandria, Virginia
- Employees: 1,149 (2020)
- Annual budget: $316.8 million (2021)
- Agency executives: John Crews, Chairman; Nate Kreoger, Acting Chief of Staff
- Website: www.ncua.gov

The National Credit Union Administration (NCUA) is an American government-backed insurer of credit unions in the United States, one of two federal government agencies that provide deposit insurance to depositors in U.S. credit unions, with the other being the Federal Deposit Insurance Corporation (FDIC) which insures commercial banks and savings institutions. The NCUA is an independent federal agency created by the United States Congress to regulate, charter, and supervise federal credit unions.

With the backing of the full faith and credit of the U.S. government, the NCUA operates and manages the National Credit Union Share Insurance Fund, insuring the deposits of more than 142 million account holders in all federal credit unions and the overwhelming majority of state-chartered credit unions. In addition to the Share Insurance Fund, the NCUA operates three other funds: the NCUA Operating Fund, the Central Liquidity Facility (CLF), and the Community Development Revolving Loan Fund (CDRLF). The NCUA Operating Fund, along with the Share Insurance Fund, finances the agency's operations.

As of December 31, 2024, there were 4,455 federally insured credit unions, with assets totaling $2.31 trillion, and net loans of $1.65 trillion. The NCUA exclusively insures credit unions, whereas commercial banks and savings institutions are insured by the Federal Deposit Insurance Corporation.

== Organization ==
The NCUA is governed by a three-member board appointed by the president of the United States and confirmed by the Senate. The president also chooses who will serve as Chairman. No more than two members may be members of the same political party. Board members serve six-year terms, and cannot be reappointed to succeed themselves, unless initially appointed to fill the remainder of an unexpired term. Board members may, however, continue to serve until their successor is confirmed and takes office.

=== Board members ===
The current board members as of August 24, 2026:

Position	Name	Party	Took office	Term expires
Chair	John Crews	Republican	August 19, 2026	August 2, 2031
Vice chair	Vacant (Note: Todd M. Harper was fired by President Trump. He is contesting his firing in court.)	—N/a	—	April 10, 2027
Member	Vacant (Note: Tanya F. Otsuka was fired by President Trump. She is contesting her firing in court.)	—N/a	—	August 2, 2029

The NCUA is administered through three regional offices, each responsible for specific states and territories.

Region	Headquarters	States/territories
Eastern Region	Alexandria, VA	Connecticut, Delaware, the District of Columbia, Maine, Maryland, Massachusetts, Michigan, New Hampshire, New Jersey, New York, Ohio, Pennsylvania, Rhode Island, Vermont, Virginia, and West Virginia.
Southern Region	Austin, TX	Alabama, Arkansas, Florida, Georgia, Indiana, Kentucky, Louisiana, Mississippi, North Carolina, Oklahoma, Puerto Rico, South Carolina, Tennessee, Texas, and the U.S. Virgin Islands.
Western Region	Tempe, AZ	Alaska, Arizona, California, Colorado, Guam, Hawaii, Idaho, Illinois, Iowa, Kansas, Minnesota, Missouri, Montana, Nebraska, Nevada, New Mexico, North Dakota, Oregon, South Dakota, Utah, Washington, Wisconsin, and Wyoming.

== History ==
As part of the New Deal, President Franklin D. Roosevelt signed the Federal Credit Union Act into law in 1934. The law allowed the chartering of federal credit unions in all states. The federal law sought to make credit available and promote thrift through a national system of nonprofit, cooperative credit.

At first, the newly created Bureau of Federal Credit Unions was housed at the Farm Credit Administration. Regulatory responsibility shifted over the years as the bureau migrated from the Federal Deposit Insurance Corporation to the Federal Security Agency, then to the Department of Health, Education, and Welfare.

In the 1940s and 1950s, credit unions grew steadily, reaching a membership of more than six million people at over 10,000 federal credit unions by 1960.

=== 1970s ===
The former seal of the NCUA, used from 1971 to 2017

The growth in credit unions resulted in an overhauling of the Bureau of Federal Credit Unions to form the modern independent federal agency that presently regulates the industry.

In 1970, the renaming to National Credit Union Administration was made possible in part by the creation of the National Credit Union Share Insurance Fund (NCUSIF) to insure credit union deposits. The NCUSIF was created without any tax dollars, capitalized solely by credit unions.

By 1977, services available to credit union members expanded, including share certificates and mortgage lending. In 1979, a three-member Board replaced the NCUA administrator. Congress added the finishing touches to this new administration with the addition of the Central Liquidity Facility, the lender of last resort for all credit unions.

The decade of the 1970s saw substantial growth for existing credit unions, with membership doubling and assets tripling to over $65 billion.

=== 1980s and 1990s ===
The high interest rates and unemployment in the early 1980s brought insurance losses. The NCUSIF experienced strain, and credit unions lobbied Congress to recapitalize the Fund. In 1985, the plan became law, and federally insured credit unions recapitalized the NCUSIF by depositing 1 percent of their shares into the NCUSIF. The fully capitalized National Credit Union Share Insurance Fund has "fail safe" features. In 1991, when equity level dipped below 1.23 percent, the Board charged credit unions a premium to insure deposits. The enhancement of member services in the 1980s accompanied deregulation and increased flexibility in merger and field of membership criteria. Previously, membership in credit unions was generally limited to select groups with a pre-existing common bond, often employees of a particular company or trade. Changes since 1998 as a result of H.R. 1151, the Credit Union Membership Access Act, opened up membership eligibility to include much larger and loosely defined groups.

During the 1990s and into the 21st century, credit unions grew steadily in assets, shares and members. Failures remained generally low, and the Share Insurance Fund maintained a healthy equity level.

=== 2000s and 2010s ===
During the 1990s and into the beginning of the 21st century, U.S. credit unions continued to develop as a whole. The NCUSIF also continued to thrive due to very few credit union failures. The 2008 financial crisis exerted a strain on all institutions in the financial services sector – including credit unions. As a result, the Board charged NCUSIF premiums in 2009 and 2010.

Ultimately, five of the largest wholesale corporate credit unions (Constitution Corporate, Members United Corporate, Western Corporate, Southwest Corporate, and U.S. Central Corporate) in the United States were rendered insolvent after investing in troubled mortgage-backed securities that became overwhelmed with unprecedented declines in value.

In response to the growing corporate credit union crisis, the NCUA took the following actions:

- Collaborated with the U.S. Treasury Department and Congress to establish the Temporary Corporate Credit Union Stabilization Fund (Stabilization Fund) to stabilize the U.S. credit unions, protect the NCUSIF and ensured credit unions, not taxpayers, paid the costs of the Stabilization Fund over time.
- Re-securitized the unsuccessful mortgage backed securities after liquidating the five failed corporate credit unions. With a government-backed guarantee, the securities were sold to raise nearly $30 billion.
- A temporary share guarantee was established for deposits at corporate credit unions.
- Bridge corporate credit unions were established to ensure services continued to be provided to consumer credit unions during the transition and resolution timeframe.
- Worked together with bridge corporate credit union members and to ensure a seamless transition of services to new entities.

In addition to the corporate credit union crisis, the NCUA dealt with the failure of a number of consumer-owned credit unions, which weakened as a result of spikes in home foreclosures, business failures, and unemployment.

To protect against the failure of more credit unions, the NCUA implemented a 12-month examination cycle for federally insured credit unions to detect problems in individual credit unions before they became insurmountable. NCUA also stepped up administrative actions wherever necessary to ensure prompt compliance. By year-end 2009, more than 96 percent of credit unions met the statutory definition of "well capitalized."

On December 8, 2017, President Donald Trump issued an executive order revising the Seal for the National Credit Union Administration.

On August 20, 2019, the D.C. Circuit Court of Appeals upheld much of the NCUA's 2016 field-of-membership regulations changes, and on June 29, 2020, the Supreme Court of the United States denied an appeal to review the NCUA's 2016 field-of-membership rule.

=== 2020s and beyond ===
On March 10, 2020, the NCUA celebrated its 50th anniversary.

On March 16, 2020, in response to the global coronavirus pandemic, the NCUA issued a Letter to Credit Unions that outlines several strategies credit unions may consider when determining how to address the challenges associated with COVID-19. Throughout the pandemic, the NCUA provided targeted regulatory flexibility, where appropriate, so federally insured credit unions could manage their operational and financial risks. Notably, the NCUA worked to bolster the Central Liquidity Facility and enhance its ability to serve as a liquidity backstop for the system during 2020. Following the regulatory enhancements provided by the Coronavirus Aid, Relief, and Economic Security (CARES) Act and changes to the agency's regulations by the NCUA Board, the facility experienced a significant increase in its membership and borrowing capacity.

Because the COVID-19 pandemic posed unique economic and financial challenges to rural and underserved communities, the NCUA committed the majority of its 2020 Community Development Revolving Loan Fund allocation to COVID-19 assistance.

In 2021 and beyond, the NCUA's goals include advancing economic equity and justice within the credit union movement and build on the agency's ACCESS program. Plans call for enhancing support for minority depository institutions, ensuring compliance with fair lending laws, advancing initiatives to close the wealth gap, and proactively considering future challenges like climate change to mitigate risks posed by rising seas, climbing temperatures, and devastating wildfires.

== Insurance coverage ==
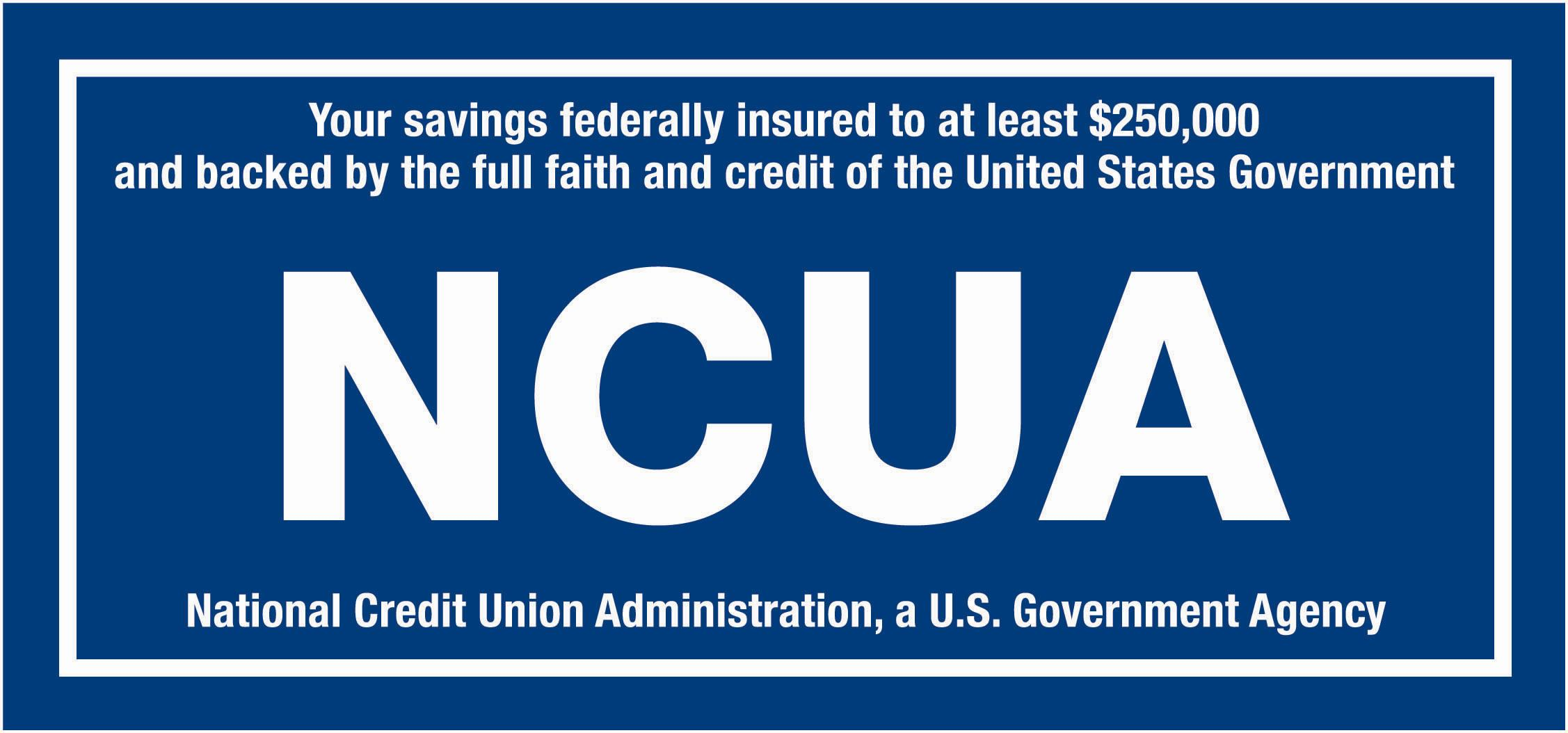
This sign, displayed at all federally insured credit unions, informs members that their savings are insured by the NCUA.

The National Credit Union Share Insurance Fund (NCUSIF) is the federal fund created by the United States Congress in 1970 to insure members' deposits in federally insured credit unions. On July 22, 2010, the Dodd–Frank Wall Street Reform and Consumer Protection Act was signed into law and included permanently establishing NCUA's standard minimum share insurance amount at $250,000. The NCUA operates and manages the NCUSIF, insuring the deposits of more than 111 million account holders in all federal credit unions and the overwhelming majority of state-chartered credit unions.

Credit unions may also offer an array of additional financial services which are not covered by federal insurance.

== Leadership ==
Since 1979, the following persons have served as NCUA chair:

No.	Portrait	Chairpersons	Term started	Term ended	Notes
1		Lawrence Connell	1979	1981	
2		Edgar F. Callahan	1981	1985	
3		Roger W. Jepsen	1985	1993	
4		Norman E. D'Amours	1993	2000	
5		Dennis Dollar	2001	2004	
6		Jo Ann M. Johnson	2004	July 2008	
7		Michael E. Fryzel	July 29, 2008	August 2009	
8		Debbie Matz	August 24, 2009	May 1, 2016	
9		Rick Metsger	May 2, 2016	January 22, 2017	
acting		J. Mark McWatters	January 23, 2017	June 23, 2017	
10		J. Mark McWatters	June 23, 2017	April 8, 2019	
11		Rodney E. Hood	April 8, 2019	January 20, 2021	
acting		Todd M. Harper	January 20, 2021	July 11, 2022	
12		Todd M. Harper	July 11, 2022	January 20, 2025	
13		Kyle S. Hauptman	January 20, 2025	August 10, 2026	
14		John Crews	August 24, 2026	Present	

== See also ==
- Title 12 of the Code of Federal Regulations
- Credit Union National Association
- NCUA Corporate Stabilization Program
- NCUA v. First National Bank & Trust
- List of financial supervisory authorities by country
