= Credit unions in the United States =

Member-owned financial cooperatives

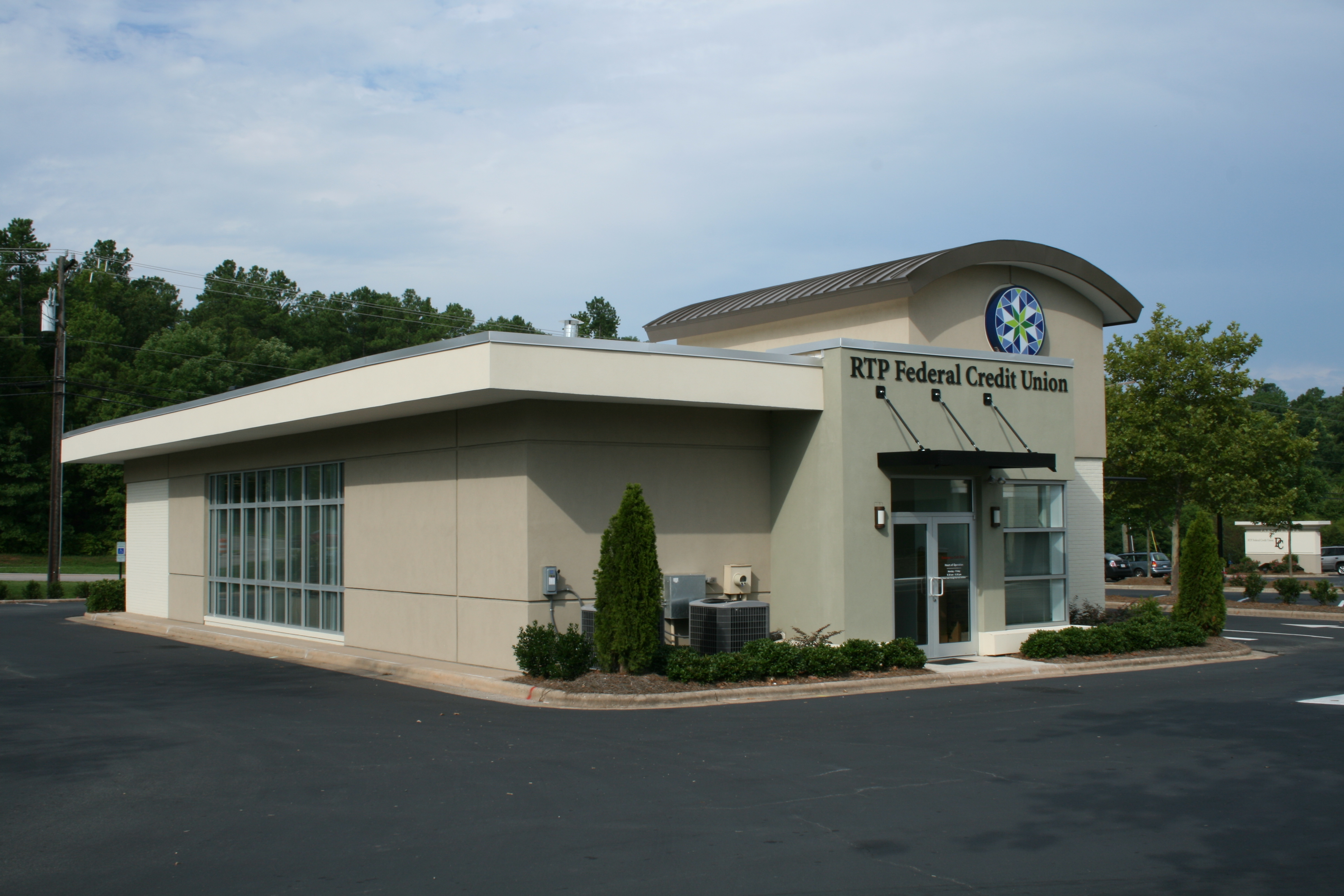
RTP Federal Credit Union in Research Triangle Park, North Carolina

In the first quarter of 2026, 4,250 federally insured credit unions served 145.8 million members. U.S. credit unions are not-for-profit, cooperative, tax-exempt organizations. The clients of the credit unions become partners of the financial institution and their presence focuses in certain neighborhoods because they center their services in one specific community. As of March 2020, the largest American credit union was Navy Federal Credit Union, serving U.S. Department of Defense employees, contractors, and families of servicepeople, with over $125 billion in assets and over 9.1 million members. Total credit union assets in the U.S. reached $1 trillion as of March 2012. Approximately 236,000 people were directly employed by credit unions per data derived from the 2012 National Credit Union Administration (NCUA) Credit Union Directory. At the end of the first quarter of 2026, federally insured credit unions held $2.48 trillion in assets and $1.73 trillion in loans.

Due to their small size and limited exposure to mortgage securitizations, credit unions weathered the 2008 financial crisis reasonably well. However, two of the biggest corporate credit unions in the United States (U.S. Central Credit Union and WesCorp) with combined assets of more than $57 billion were taken over by the National Credit Union Administration on March 20, 2009.

== History ==
St. Mary's Bank of Manchester, New Hampshire, holds the distinction as the first credit union in the United States. Assisted by a personal visit from Canadian credit union pioneer Alphonse Desjardins, St. Mary's Cooperative Credit Association was founded by French-speaking immigrants to Manchester from the Maritime Provinces of Canada on November 24, 1908. As the leader of St. Marie's church, Monsignor Pierre Hevey was instrumental in establishing this credit union. Attorney Joseph Boivin managed the credit union, as a volunteer, out of his home in the evenings. America's Credit Union Museum now occupies the location of Boivin's home, where St. Mary's Bank first operated.

Pierre Jay, a central banker and Edward Filene, a Bostonian merchant and philanthropist, were instrumental in establishing enabling legislation in Massachusetts in 1908.

Filene's philanthropy, combined with the practical implementation efforts of his associate Roy Bergengren were critical to the emergence of credit unions across the United States. Unlike the credit unions of Germany or Quebec, most credit unions in the US emerged from an employer-based bond of association. In addition to the traditional information and enforcement advantages resulting from the fact that members shared the same workplace, the employer-based bond permitted credit unions to use future paychecks as collateral.

The Credit Union National Extension Bureau, the forerunner of the Credit Union National Association, was formed as a confederation of state leagues at a meeting in Estes Park, Colorado, in 1934. Attendees at the meeting included Dora Maxwell who would go on to help establish hundreds of credit unions and programs for the poor in her lifetime and Louise McCarren Herring, whose work to form credit unions and ensure their safe operation earned the title of "Mother of Credit Unions" in the United States.

The number of credit unions reached their peak in 1969 with 23,866 institutions and total assets of $16 billion.

A museum on the history of credit unions, America's Credit Union Museum, is located in Manchester, New Hampshire. It opened in 2002.

In 2025, the Republican-led Congress began to seriously consider removing the federal tax-exempt status of credit unions to make cuts to the federal budget. The initial One Big Beautiful Bill Act, which would have included the provision, passed the House of Representatives without including an attempt to alter or eliminate the tax-exempt status. This provision was however excised in the bill's revised and then passed form.

== Constitution and regulation ==
Credit unions in the United States may either be chartered by the federal government ("federal credit unions") or a state government. The states of Delaware, South Dakota, and Wyoming do not regulate credit unions at the state level; in those states, a credit union must obtain a federal charter to operate. All federal credit unions and 95% of state-chartered credit unions have "share insurance" (deposit insurance) of at least $250,000 per member through the National Credit Union Share Insurance Fund (NCUSIF). This deposit insurance is backed by the full faith and credit of the United States government and is administered by the National Credit Union Administration. As of December 2006, the NCUSIF had a higher insurance fund capital ratio than the fund for the Federal Deposit Insurance Corporation (FDIC). U.S. credit unions also typically have higher equity capital ratios than U.S. banks.

As of the end of 2016, the National Credit Union Share Insurance Fund insured more than $1 trillion in deposits at 5,785 not-for-profit cooperative US credit unions. For comparison, the FDIC insured more than $13 trillion in deposits at 5,980 banks and thrift institutions. The NCUA and the FDIC are both independent federal agencies backed by the full faith and credit of the US government.

== Membership restrictions ==
In the United States, as elsewhere, credit unions were historically formed around a single church, place of work, labor union, or town. Membership was limited to those who were in the field of membership. The Federal Credit Union Act of 1934 limited membership to "groups having a common bond of occupation or association, or to groups within a well-defined neighborhood, community or rural district."

A 1982 Interpretive Ruling and Policy Statement (IRPS) 82-4 allowed many credit unions to grow their memberships and expand into multiple states. Credit union membership reached 71 million members by 1997, more than double the number of members in 1991. This expansion prompted banks to challenge the 1982 regulation as illegal, a challenge upheld in a 1998 U.S. Supreme Court decision, NCUA v. First National Bank & Trust. Within five months, both houses of Congress passed a bill signed by President Clinton to overturn the Court's decision.

Legally, and for tax purposes, credit unions in the US are considered to be non-profit organizations. Banks argue that this status exempts credit unions from many federal and state taxes, giving credit unions a competitive advantage. As of 2003, U.S. governmental regulatory agencies require that credit unions restrict their membership to defined segments of the population, such as people who live, work, worship, or attend school in a well-defined geographic area; employees of specific companies or trades; members of specific non-profit groups, including labor unions, alumni associations, conservation or other advocacy organizations, lodges, churches, or the like; or a particular occupational group, such as teachers, doctors, etc. In the US this is referred to as a credit union's "field of membership", and internationally the term bond of association is used.

Credit unions may typically be chartered to serve a specific employee or associational group or groups (often called a Select Employee Group or "SEG Charter"), all members of a trade, industry, or profession (a "TIP Charter"), or have a "Community Charter" (typically a field of membership of anyone who lives, works, goes to school, or attends religious services in a particular city, county, or counties). When a credit union converts to a Community Charter from a SEG Charter or TIP Charter, it can continue to serve its existing members as well as anyone who lives, works, worships, or attends school within its new geographical field of membership, but cannot admit new members from its former SEG(s) or TIP (unless the group in question is located within "the new community credit union's boundaries"). Similarly, a credit union that converts to a TIP or SEG charter from a different charter type can no longer admit new members from its old field of membership.

Typically, members' families – such as immediate family or household members – can also join the credit union. In the United States, the National Credit Union Administration or a state regulator – depending upon whether or not the credit union is chartered by the federal government or by a state – decides whether or not to approve or deny proposed field of membership expansions or charter conversions to other credit union charters.

Mergers of smaller credit unions with disparate membership bases often result in a credit union with a wide variety of ways to qualify to join; thus, a credit union may have a much broader "field of membership" than that credit union's name would imply.

Credit unions generally follow the principle of "once a member, always a member", which allows a member with a current credit union membership to remain a member even if they would otherwise no longer qualify to be such, such as leaving the company with whom they initially gained membership or moving outside the credit union's defined geographic area. However, many credit unions reserve the right of expulsion against a member who causes a financial loss. Some credit unions also have expelled members, including elected Board and Supervisory Committee volunteers, for making whistleblower complaints against credit union management.

== Underserved and low-income areas ==
Federal credit unions may apply to the NCUA for Low-Income Credit Union (LICU) status. To qualify for LICU status, the majority of the credit union's members must be considered "low-income" based on specific requirements set by the NCUA. This LICU status allows the credit unions to benefit from certain NCUA programs to enhance their capacity to serve underserved populations who may otherwise lack access to credit or other financial services. In addition, some state regulators also provide for similar low-income designations.

Unlike banks, which were caught redlining underserved areas in the 1970s, credit unions are not subject to federal "community reinvestment" requirements, essentially because credit unions, by their nature and mission of "people helping people", already meet the financial needs of a broad spectrum of people that fall within their fields of membership, and may play an active role in community development and growth. Credit unions are exempt from the Community Reinvestment Act, a U.S. federal law that encourages banks to provide services in low- and moderate-income areas.

In 2006, U.S. credit unions approved 69% of mortgage applications they received from low- and moderate-income individuals, while other U.S. mortgage lenders approved only 47%, according to data collected in compliance with Home Mortgage Disclosure Act. The same data shows that U.S. credit unions approved 62% of minority members' mortgage applications, versus a 51% for other U.S. mortgage lenders. That data also shows that 25.2% of all U.S. credit union mortgage originations were for low- or moderate-income borrowers, versus 20.6% at other U.S. mortgage lenders. However, the NCUA has long discouraged U.S. credit unions from giving members loans that they may not be able to repay, and has forbidden other types of predatory lending and abusive credit practices. Federal credit unions are also forbidden from charging prepayment penalties on loans.

== Interest rates ==
United States credit unions typically pay higher interest rates on deposits and charge lower interest rates on loans than banks. Because members are part owners of credit unions, interest is typically called dividends and deposits are typically called shares. Credit unions therefore often have a higher “cost of assets” (i.e., interest expense as a percentage of average assets) than commercial banks, with aggregate U.S. credit union cost of assets being higher than the aggregate U.S. bank cost of assets in eight of the thirteen years between 1995 and 2007.

In order for credit unions (and banks) to maintain capital reserves and stay solvent, their revenues (from loans and investments) must meet or exceed their operating expenses (interest paid on deposits) and dividends.

A credit union's policies governing interest rates and other matters are set by a volunteer Board of Directors elected by and from the membership itself.

== Leagues and associations ==
Credit unions in the United States have traditionally used a state/national trade association relationship that aligns credit unions with state credit union leagues, followed by national affiliation with the Credit Union National Association (CUNA) of Madison, Wisconsin. Federal credit unions may also be members of the National Association of Federal Credit Unions (NAFCU). Credit unions can also participate in a credit union service organization (CUSO) that provides shared resources to member credit unions such as call centers, lending teams, and data centers. Participating in a CUSO allows credit unions to provide additional services to customers such as business and commercial real estate lending.

Credit unions with a specific focus on serving low- and moderate-income people and communities, typically designated as low-income by the NCUA, often join the New York, New York-based National Federation of Community Development Credit Unions (Federation), a national trade association providing investments, technical assistance, education and training and advocacy for community development credit unions (CDCUs) nationwide.

== Credit unions vs banks ==
Establishing an account at a credit union usually requires a smaller deposit than that of a bank; credit unions usually require $5–$30 to open an account, while major banks sometimes require $50–$100 deposit. The required minimum deposit to join a credit union is called a share and establishes the depositor as a member with full ownership rights.

Tension has always existed between member-owned cooperative credit unions and for-profit banks in the United States. When credit unions were first organizing in the US in the early 20th century, the banking industry was opposed, remaining so ever since.

Due to their status as not-for-profit, member-owned financial institutions with no source of secondary investment capital, credit unions in the US are exempt from federal and state income taxes (but not from other forms of tax, such as payroll, sales, or property taxes). Credit union members themselves pay income tax on dividends earned through financial participation in the credit union; this is similar to the taxation structure enjoyed by many banks incorporated under Subchapter S of Chapter 1 of the Internal Revenue Code.

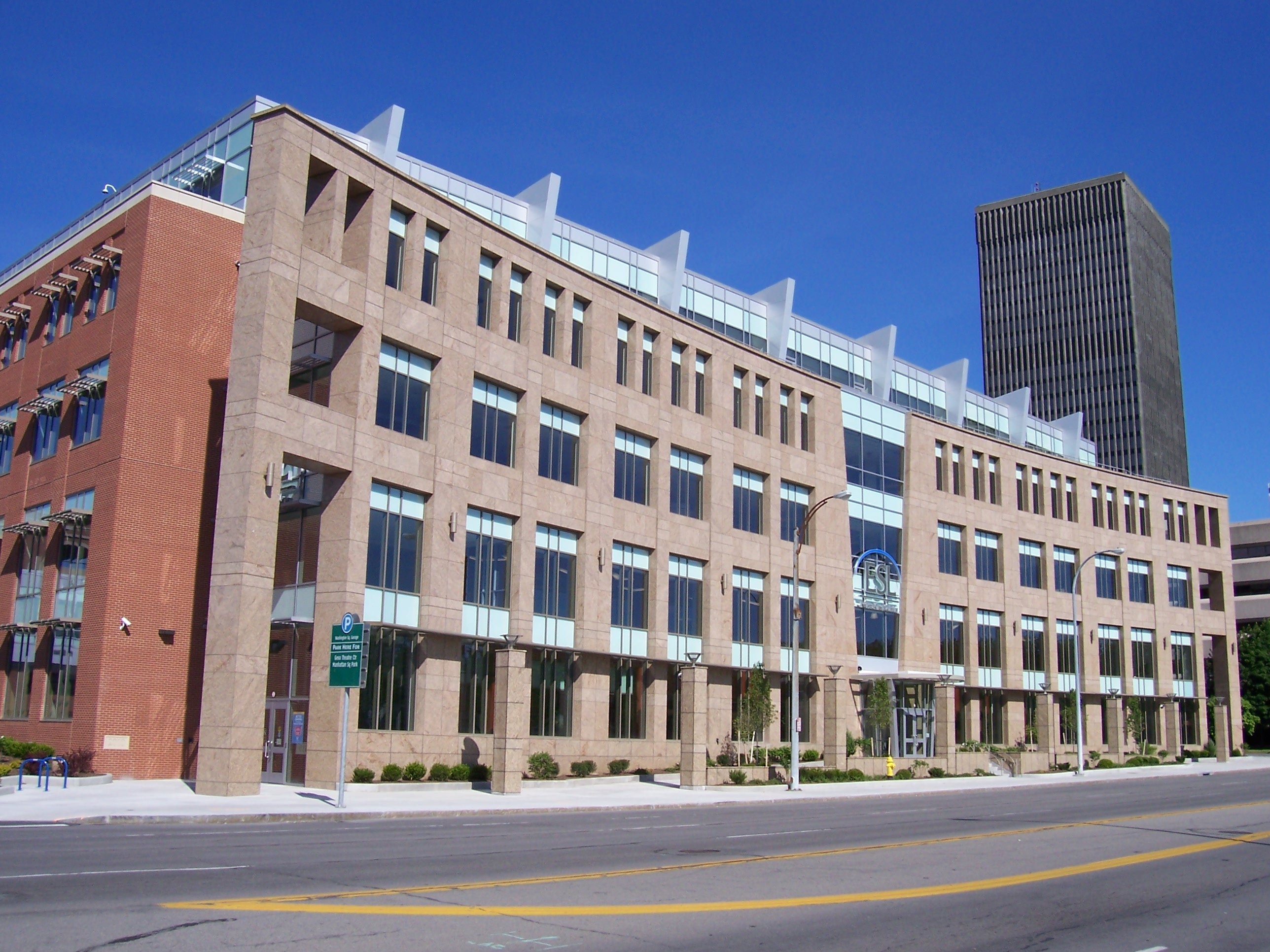
ESL Federal Credit Union in Rochester, New York

To extend their member service reach, many credit unions participate in shared ATM and branch networks. Many credit unions participate in the CO-OP Network, which allows members of participating credit unions to use nearly 30,000 ATMs without fees or surcharges. Shared branching is a cooperative venture whereby members of one credit union can perform basic transactions at no additional cost at any branch owned by other credit unions within the network.

Bank holding companies and their affiliates aggressively compete to provide services to credit unions through their ATMs networks, corporate checking accounts, and certificate of deposit programs. In 2007, the American Bankers Association (ABA) barred credit union employees from attending ABA-sponsored educational seminars. This includes online classes that require registration. Based on the pretext that the ABA only wants to serve its members, the ABA continues to try to weaken credit unions and take back the market share that credit unions currently hold.

== Credit union-to-bank conversions ==
Since 1995, over 30 US credit unions have converted from credit union charters to bank charters. These conversions are generally initiated by a credit union's leadership team, rather than from the rank-and-file membership, and have created sharp controversy within the credit union industry. Some have questioned whether these conversions are in the best interests of the credit union members, and have compared them to the mutual savings bank conversion raids of the 1980s.

Like the mutual savings raids, credit union conversions have been very lucrative for executives and directors of converting credit unions. CU Financial, a consulting firm that helps credit union management execute these conversions, has explained in marketing materials that if a credit union with $50 million in capital converts to a stock bank, under certain conditions a payoff in the "$1.2 million range for each director is not out of the question," while executives might also expect additional stock compensation that "could lead to a $10 million-plus ownership stake for a capable CEO".

Members of at least six credit unions have organized to oppose their management's conversion proposals, objecting that this insider enrichment comes at the detriment of credit union members. They point out that while insiders have made windfall profits, most members have lost their ownership stake without compensation, and face worse rates and fees after the conversion. Comparisons of interest rates show that credit unions that have converted to banks now charge their members more for loans, and pay less for savings. Member groups have included Save Columbia Credit Union, Save First Basin Credit Union, Save Tech CU, and DFCU Owners United.

The National Center for Member Trust is a consumer protection non-profit organization "formed to support the member-owners of credit unions that are trying to convert to banks." The Coalition for Credit Union Charter Options is an advocacy group for converting credit unions. UC Berkeley Professor of Financial Institutions James Wilcox is an expert who has released a number of studies on the issue. His findings are summarized in "Credit Union Conversions: Ripe for Abuse... and Reforms", published in the Credit Union Times in July 2006.

== See also ==
- American Credit Union Mortgage Association
- Credit unions in Canada
- Credit unions in the United Kingdom
- History of credit unions
- List of credit unions in the United States
