= Timeline of Manchester, New Hampshire =

Coordinates: 42.990833°N 71.463611°W

The following is a timeline of the history of the city of Manchester, New Hampshire, United States.

== Prior to 19th century ==
- 1722 - John Goffe settles in Old Harry's Town, in the British Province of New Hampshire.
- 1723 - A cabin was built and gradually a small settlement grew up.
- 1727 - Tyngstown (or “Tyng’s Township”) established.
- 1736 - The first sawmill was erected.
- 1751 - Tyngstown rechartered as "Derryfield."
- 1788 - Province becomes part of the State of New Hampshire.
- 1796 - Derryfield Social Library founded.

== 19th century ==
- 1807 - Canal built by Samuel Blodgett.
- 1810
  - Derryfield renamed "Manchester."
  - Amoskeag Cotton & Woolen Manufacturing Company incorporated.
- 1823 - Population: 761.
- 1839
  - Amoskeag Representative newspaper begins publication.
  - First Congregational Society incorporated.
  - First Baptist Church organized.
- 1840 - Population: 3,235.
- 1841
  - First Unitarian Church built.
  - Valley Cemetery laid out.
- 1842 - Ann Bamford begins working in the Underground Railway
- 1843 - Mennell's Circulating Library in business (approximate date).
- 1844 - Manchester Athenaeum established.
- 1846
  - City incorporated.
  - Manchester High School established.
- 1849 - Manchester and Lawrence Railroad begins operating.
- 1850
  - Manchester Daily Mirror newspaper begins publication.
  - City Missionary Society established.
- 1851 - City hosts state fair.
- 1852 - Manchester Gas Light Co. established.
- 1854
  - Manchester City Library established.
  - Manchester Locomotive Works formed.
- 1855 - First Presbyterian Church organized.
- 1860 - Population: 8,841.
- 1863 - Union Leader newspaper begins publication.
- 1869
  - Hillsborough County seat relocated to Manchester from Amherst.
  - Cathedral of St. Joseph founded.
  - St. Joseph Cemetery in operation.
- 1870
  - Turnverein organized.
  - Population: 23,509.
- 1874 - Ash Street School built.
- 1875 - Women's Aid Home organized.
- 1880
  - Manchester Opera House Company organized.
  - Ste. Marie Church founded.
  - Population: 33,592.
- 1883 - Union Publishing Co. incorporated.
- 1885 - Young People's Christian Union organized.
- 1886 - Devonshire Mills incorporated.
- 1887
  - People's Baptist Church organized.
  - Novelty Advertising Co. incorporated.
- 1889 - Saint Anselm College established in neighboring Goffstown.
- 1890
  - Elliot Hospital founded.
  - Population: 44,126.
- 1891 - Swedish Baptist Church organized.
- 1892
  - Beech Street Grounds baseball stadium in operation.
  - Sacred Heart Hospital founded.
- 1893 - Stark Park dedicated.
- 1894
  - Manchester Children's Home organized.
  - Eureka Shoe Co. incorporated.
- 1895
  - Manchester Historical Association established.
  - Varick Park sports complex in operation.
- 1897 - Weston Observatory built.
- 1898
  - Manchester Institute of Arts and Sciences founded.
  - Manchester Camera Club organized.
- 1900 - Population: 56,987.

== 20th century ==
- 1906 - Strand Theatre in business in the former Opera House.
- 1910
  - Population: 70,063.
  - Centennial celebration of city founding.
- 1911 - Adath Yeshurun synagogue built.
- 1912 - Empire Theater built.
- 1913 - Textile Field sports stadium built.
- 1914 - Palace Theatre and Public Library built.
- 1922 - Manchester Central High School renamed, adding "Central".
- 1923 - Manchester High School West established.
- 1927 - Manchester Airport established.
- 1929 - Currier Gallery of Art founded.
- 1932 - New Hampshire School of Accounting and Secretarial Science (now Southern New Hampshire University) founded.
- 1935 - Amoskeag Mills close.
- 1942 - Grenier Army Airfield dedicated.
- 1945
  - State Trade School at Manchester founded.
  - Utility Worker's Credit Union formed.
- 1950 - Zimmerman House designed by Frank Lloyd Wright.
- 1954 - WMUR begins broadcasting.
- 1960 - Manchester Memorial High School opens.
- 1963 - John F. Kennedy Memorial Coliseum opens.
- 1964 - The Derryfield School established.
- 1966 - Grenier Air Force Base closes.
- 1971 - McIntyre Ski Area opens.
- 1972 - Hampshire Plaza building constructed.
- 1973 - Manchester Transit Authority founded.
- 1974 - New Hampshire Symphony Orchestra formed.
- 1977 - Mall of New Hampshire opens.
- 1980 - Population: 90,936.
- 1982 - Manchester School of Technology established.
- 1985 - University of New Hampshire at Manchester established.
- 1988 - Sister city relationship established with Taichung, Taiwan.
- 1990 - Franco-American Centre founded.
- 1992
  - City Hall Plaza building constructed.
  - Sister city relationship established with Neustadt an der Weinstraße, Germany.
- 1998
  - City website online (approximate date).
  - Islamic Society of Greater Manchester founded.
- 1999 - Robert A. Baines becomes mayor.

== 21st century ==
- 2000
  - Massachusetts College of Pharmacy and Health Sciences Manchester campus opens.
  - Holy Family Academy established.
- 2001
  - Civic arena opens.
- 2005
  - Fisher Cats Ballpark opens.
  - Segway Fest held.
- 2006
  - Manchester Daily Express newspaper begins publication.
  - Murder of Michael Briggs, an on-duty police officer.
- 2010
  - Ted Gatsas becomes mayor.
  - Population: 109,565.
- 2018 - Joyce Craig becomes mayor.
- 2024 - Jay Ruais becomes mayor.

== Images ==
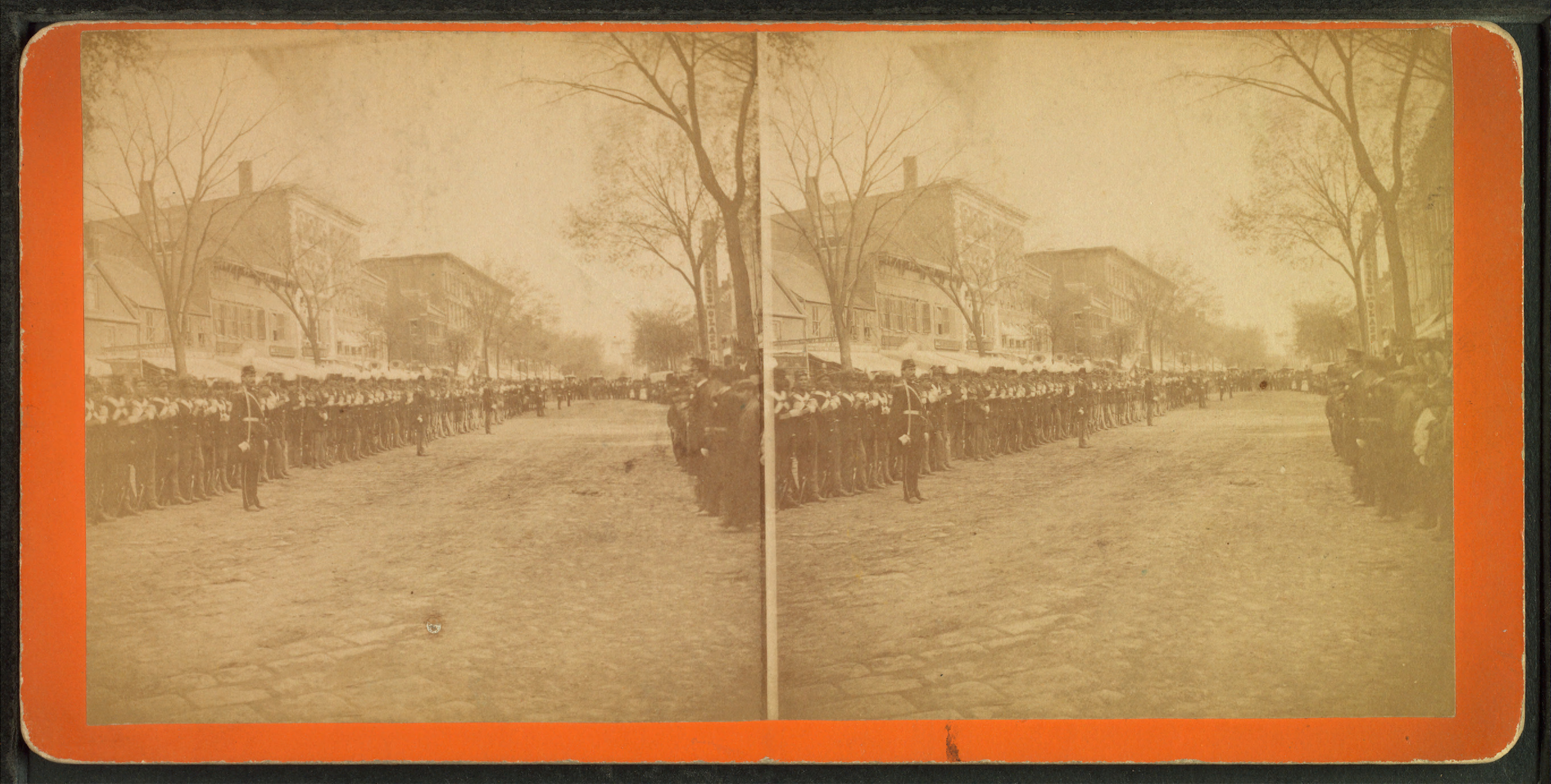
Military parade, Manchester, 1874

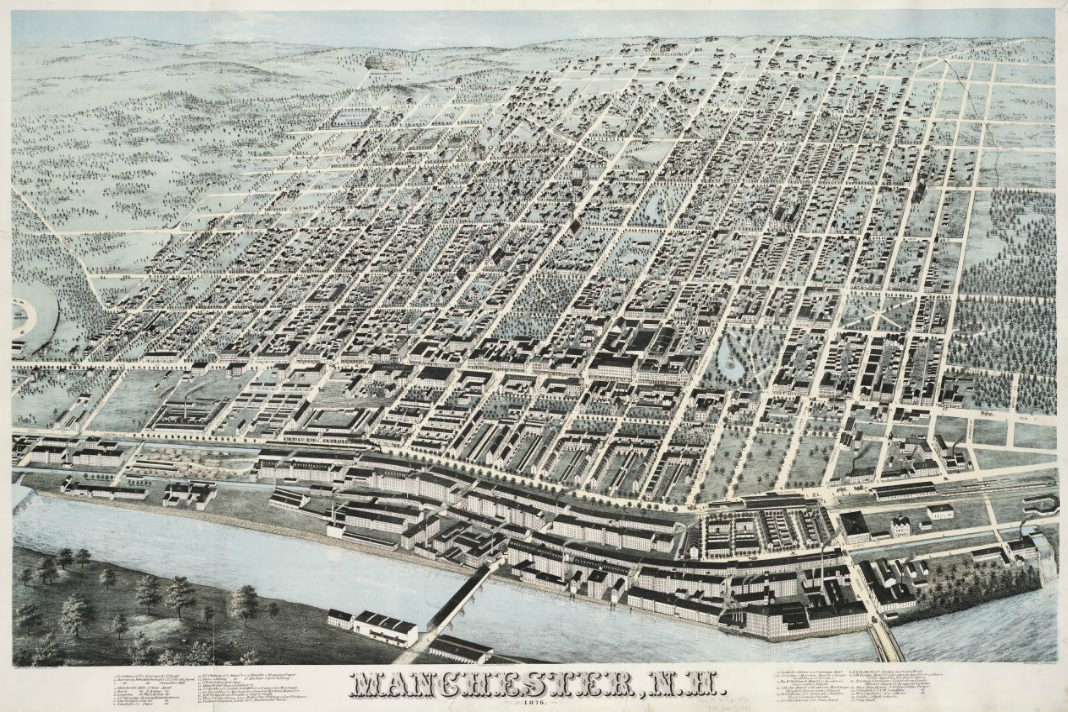
Map of Manchester, 1876

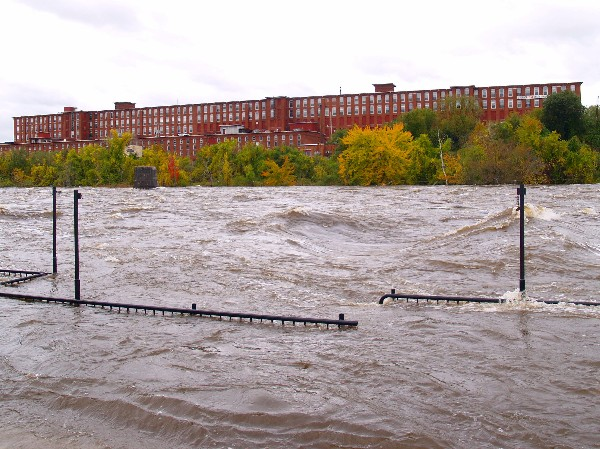
Merrimack River flood, 2005

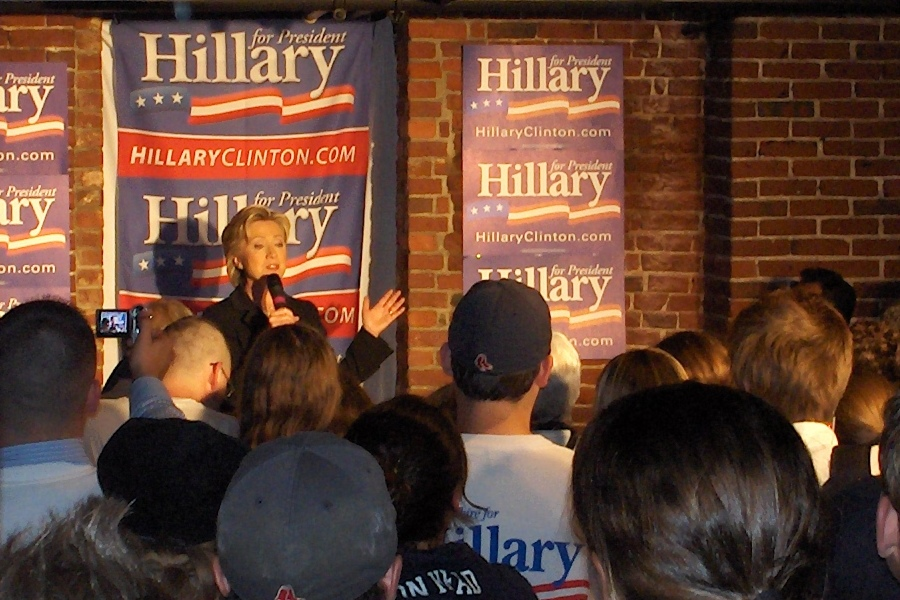
Candidate Hillary Clinton in Manchester, 2007

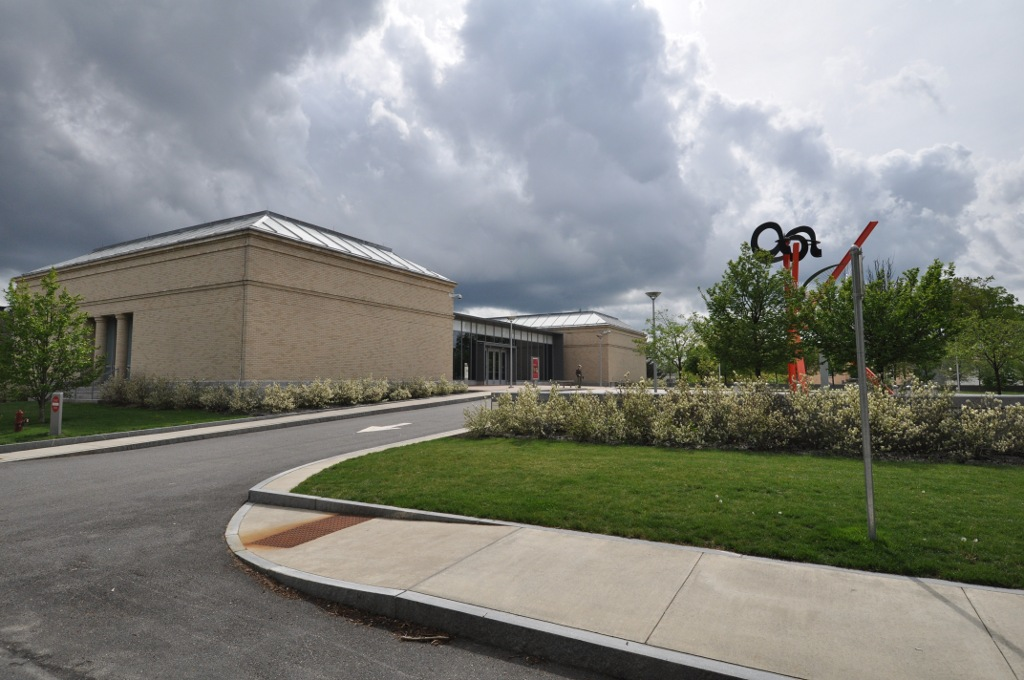
Currier Museum renovated, 2008

== See also ==
- Manchester history
- List of mayors of Manchester, New Hampshire
- Neighborhoods in Manchester, New Hampshire
- National Register of Historic Places listings in Hillsborough County, New Hampshire

== Bibliography ==
Published in the 19th century

- Jedidiah Morse; Richard C. Morse (1823), "Manchester", A New Universal Gazetteer (4th ed.), New Haven: S. Converse
- Samuel Newell Bell (1863). Index Catalogue of the Manchester City Library. Printed by C.F. Livingston.
- "Manchester", Appletons' Hand-Book of American Travel: Northern and Eastern Tour, New York: D. Appleton & Company, 1872
- "Manchester City". New Hampshire Register. Claremont, NH: Claremont Manufacturing Company. 1872.
- Maurice D. Clarke (1875), Manchester: a Brief Record of its Past and a Picture of its Present, Manchester, N.H.: J.B. Clarke, OL 23317139M
- Pocket Business Directory and Industrial and Social Statistics of the City of Manchester, N.H., 1879, Manchester: Temple & Farrington, 1879, OL 23367208M
- Manchester Directory: 1883. Boston: Sampson & Murdock. 1882.
- "City of Manchester", Leading Manufacturers and Merchants of New Hampshire, New York: International Pub. Co., 1887
- George Fox Bacon (1891), Manchester and its Leading Business Men, Boston: Mercantile Publishing Co., OL 23365091M
- 1846 Semi-Centennial Compendium of Historical Facts, Manchester, N.H.: Frank H. Challis, 1896, OL 13988380M
- Contributions to the History of Derryfield, New Hampshire: a Paper Read Before the Manchester Historic Association, Manchester, N.H.: William Ellery Moore, 1896, OL 14050532M

Published in the 20th century

- Manchester Directory: 1906. Boston: Sampson & Murdock. 1905.
- "Manchester", United States (4th ed.), Leipzig: K. Baedeker, 1909, OCLC 02338437 – via Internet Archive
- "Manchester (New Hampshire)" . Encyclopædia Britannica. Vol. 17 (11th ed.). 1910. pp. 549–550.
- Manchester Historic Association (1910), Centennial Celebration of Manchester, N.H., Manchester NH, OCLC 7811124, OL 23285372M
- "Manchester", Handbook of New England, Boston: Porter E. Sargent, 1916, OCLC 16726464
- Manchester Directory. Boston: Sampson & Murdock. 1921.
- Federal Writers' Project (1938). "Manchester". New Hampshire: a Guide to the Granite State. American Guide Series. Boston: Houghton Mifflin. hdl:2027/mdp.39015021583557 – via HathiTrust.
- Haebler, Peter. "Nativist Riots in Manchester: An Episode of Know-Nothingism in New Hampshire." Historical New Hampshire 39 (1985): 121–37.
- George Thomas Kurian (1994), "Manchester, New Hampshire", World Encyclopedia of Cities, vol. 1: North America, Santa Barbara, Calif.: ABC-CLIO, OL 1431653M (fulltext via Open Library)
- David G. Stahl (Fall–Winter 1995), "Becoming American: Manchester's Jewish Community", Historical New Hampshire, New Hampshire Historical Society
- Hareven, Tamara K., and Randolph Langenbach. Amoskeag: Life and work in an American factory-city (UPNE, 1995) The Amoskeag textile factory in Manchester was the largest in the world; this is the story of its workers. online

Published in the 21st century

- "New Hampshire: Manchester", New England (3rd ed.), Lonely Planet, 2002, p. 476+, OL 24765202M
