= French in New Hampshire =

The presence of the French language and the New England variety of French, in New Hampshire, has been around since the foundation of the state. Workers in the area even developed their own dialect of French.

After English, French is the second-most spoken language in the state, and is spoken particularly in the north, near the Quebec border. Throughout the state, for most of New Hampshire’s history and until very recently, French was automatically taught in most schools, with some Catholic and other private schools even teaching some subjects in French exclusively. According to the 2016-2020 American Community Survey, Franco-Americans (of French, French-Canadian or Acadian origin) make up the largest percentage of New Hampshire's population at 20.8%, and 5.8% of the population speaks French at home in Coös County.

== Government ==
=== The American and French Canadian Cultural Exchange Commission ===
Established in 1973, the commission was concerned with the links between New Hampshire and the French-speaking countries and regions of the world. It was composed of eleven members, appointed by the Governor and Council for a seven-year term, who live in the state and speak French. The state statute establishing the commission was repealed in 2010.

=== Relations with French-speaking Canada ===
Since 1964, New Hampshire and Quebec have entered into at least five direct agreements in the following areas: public safety, culture, environment and transportation. New Hampshire also participates in the annual Conference of New England Governors and Eastern Canadian Premiers, where Quebec and New Brunswick use French by official status.

== Commerce ==
=== Domestic ===
==== La caisse populaire Ste-Marie ====
St. Mary's Bank in Manchester has the distinction of being considered the first credit union in the United States. At the request of Bishop Pierre Hevey of Ste. Marie Church, concerned about the financial situation of the members of his French-Canadian working-class congregation, Alphonse Desjardins went to Manchester to describe the credit union movement. At the end of his lecture, his audience decided to form "La Caisse Populaire Ste- Marie", which followed the Desjardins model. This Caisse Populaire opened on November 24, 1908, at the home of Joseph Boivin, the man elected as volunteer director, and the America's Credit Union Museum stands there today. Since that time, St. Mary's has grown, through the Great Depression where it remained open during the bank closures declared by President Roosevelt, to its 100th anniversary with bank assets of $652,287,000.

== See also ==
- Demographics of the United States
- American French
- French Americans
- French language in the United States
