= Granite State =

Granite State is the nickname of the U.S. state of New Hampshire.

It may also refer to:

- Granite State Challenge, television quiz game show on New Hampshire Public Television
- Granite State College, part of the New Hampshire state university system
- Granite State Communications, a private company in Weare, New Hampshire
- Granite State Credit Union, a state-chartered credit union based in Manchester, New Hampshire
- Granite State Electric Company, a New Hampshire subsidiary of Liberty Utilities
- "Granite State" (Breaking Bad), the 15th episode of the fifth season of the American television series Breaking Bad
- USS Granite State, the final name of a warship originally called USS New Hampshire (1864)
