= Canadian Americans =

Americans of Canadian descent

Américains canadiens (French)
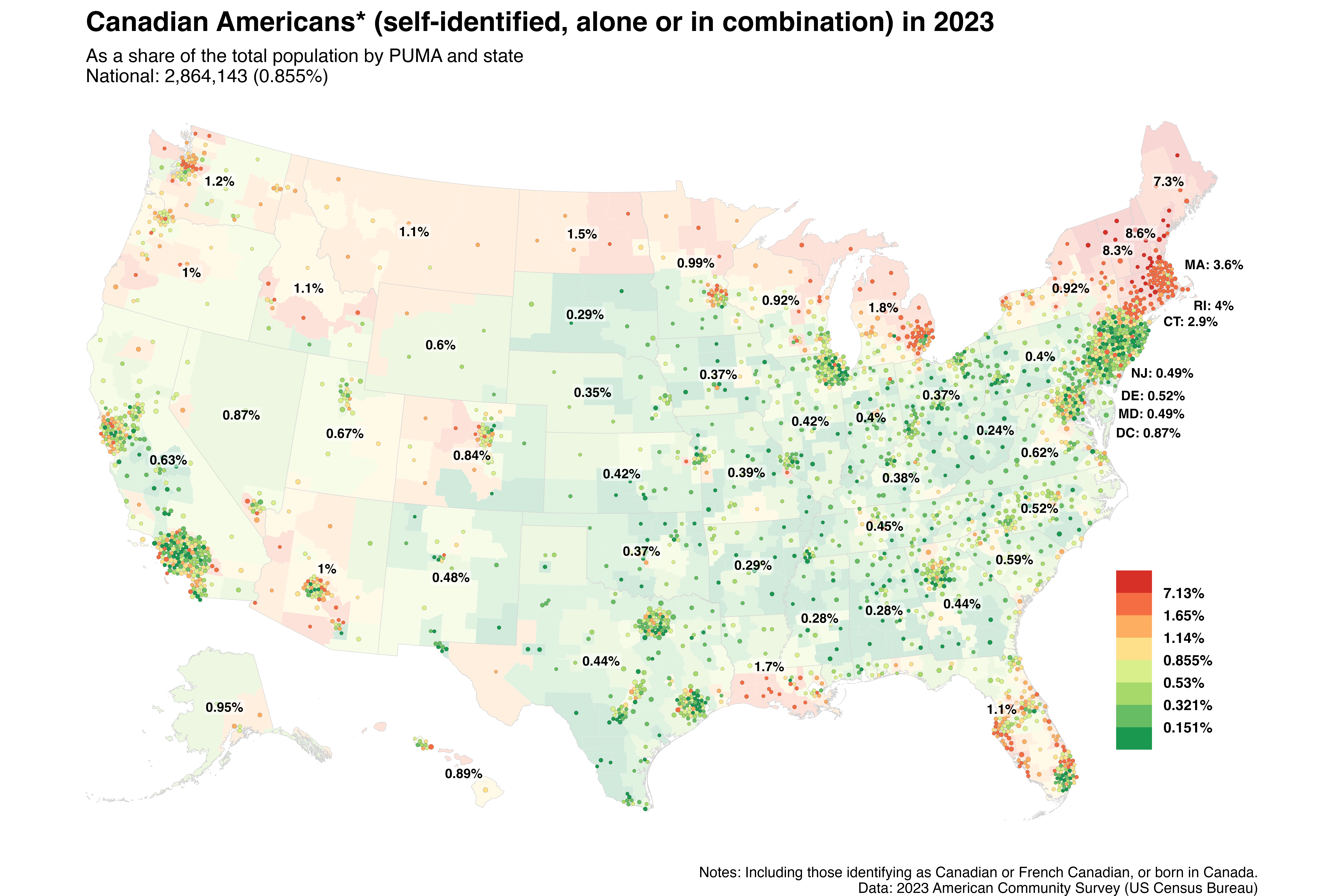
- Canadian ancestry by census division (2023)

Total population
- French Canadians : 255,600 alone or 933,700 incl. combination Canadians: 255,000 alone or 580,500 incl. combination

Regions with significant populations
- Portland, Maine; Boston; Concord; Hartford; New England; New York City; Washington; California; Washington, D.C.; Philadelphia; New Orleans; Orlando; Atlanta; Texas; Charlotte; Raleigh; Detroit; Columbus; Chicago; Milwaukee; Phoenix; Portland, Oregon; most urban areas

Languages
- English; French; Franglais

Religion
- Christianity

Related ethnic groups
- Americans, American Canadians, Canadians

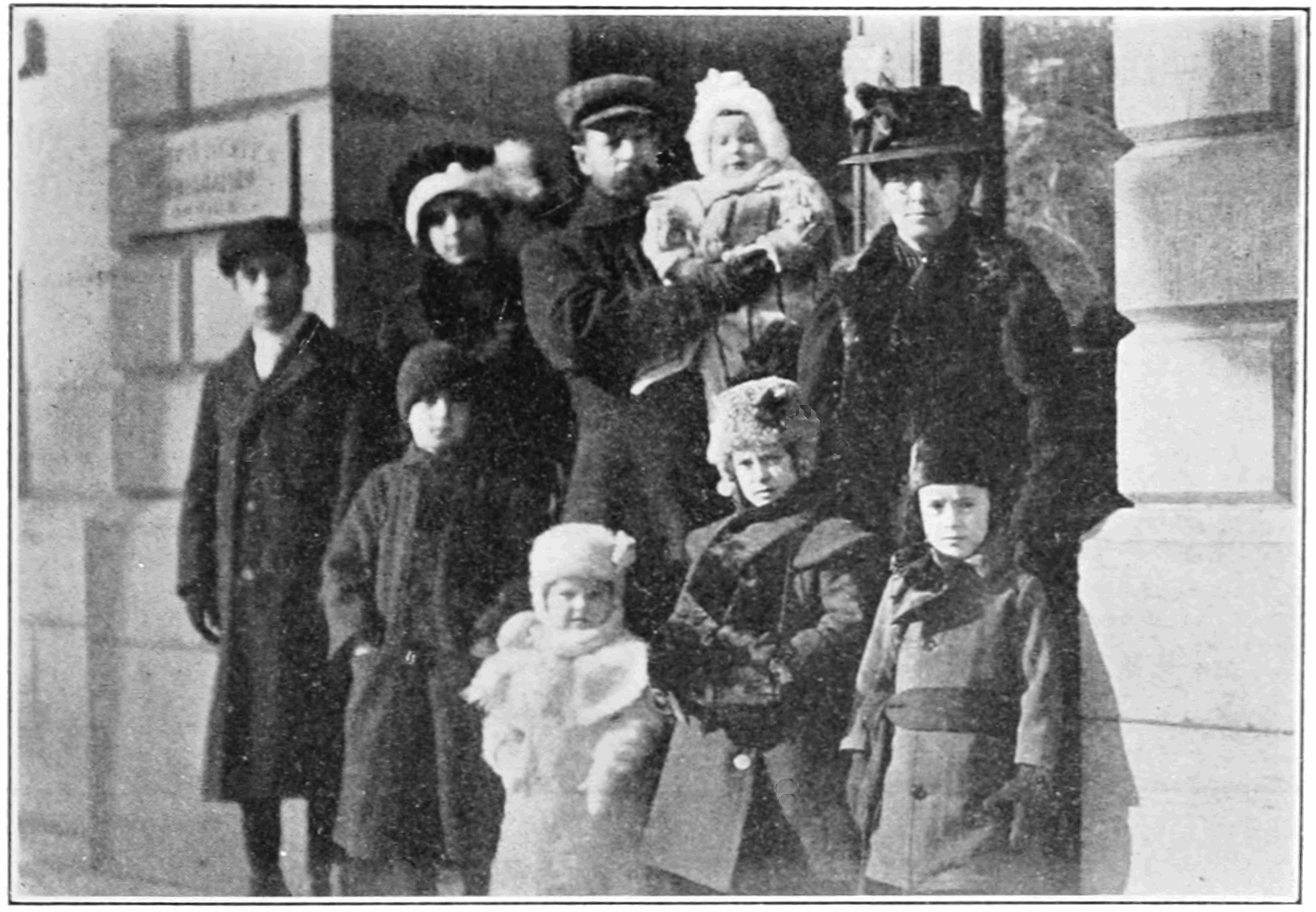
A French-Canadian family from Montréal in 1913

Canadian Americans (French: Américains canadiens) are American citizens (or in some uses residents) whose ancestry is wholly or partly Canadian, American Canadian origin, or citizens of either country who hold dual citizenship. Today, many Canadian Americans and American Canadians hold both US and Canadian citizenship.

The term Canadian can mean a nationality or an ethnicity. Canadians are considered North Americans due their residing in the North American continent. English-speaking Canadian immigrants easily integrate and assimilate into northern and western U.S. states as a result of many cultural similarities, and in the similar accent in spoken English. French Canadians, because of language and culture, tend to take longer to assimilate. However, by the 3rd generation, they are often fully culturally assimilated, and the Canadian identity is more or less folklore. This took place, even though half of the population of the province of Quebec emigrated to the US between 1840 and 1930. Many New England cities formed 'Little Canadas', but many of these have gradually disappeared.

This cultural "invisibility" within the larger US population is seen as creating stronger affinity among Canadians living in the US than might otherwise exist. According to US Census estimates, the number of Canadian residents was around 640,000 in 2000. Some sources have cited the number to possibly be over 1,000,000. This number, though, is far smaller than the number of Americans who can trace part or the whole of their ancestry to Canada. The percentage of these in the New England states is almost 25% of the total population.

In some regions of the United States, especially New England or the Midwest, a Canadian American often means one whose ancestors came from Canada.

== Canadian American Day ==
The Connecticut State Senate unanimously passed a bill in 2009, making June 24 Canadian American Day in the state of Connecticut. The bill allows state officials to hold ceremonies at the capitol and other places each year to honor Americans of Canadian ancestry.

== Aboriginal Canadian Americans ==
As a consequence of Article 3 of the Jay Treaty of 1794, official First Nations status, or in the United States, Native American status, also confers the right to live and work on either side of the border. Unlike the U.S., Canada has not codified the Jay Treaty. Canadian courts readily reject the Jay Treaty free passage of goods right.

== Study ==
Some institutions in the United States focus on Canadian-American studies, including the Canadian-American Center at the University of Maine, the Center for Canadian American studies at Western Washington University, and the University at Buffalo Canadian-American Studies Committee.

== See also ==
- American Canadians
- Category:American people of Canadian descent
- Category:Canadian emigrants to the United States
- Category:Canadian expatriates in the United States
- Canada–United States relations
- Franco-Americans
- French Canadians
- Little Canadas
- Quebec diaspora
