= Sainte Marie Roman Catholic Church Parish Historic District =

Historic district in New Hampshire, United States

- U.S. National Register of Historic Places
- U.S. Historic district
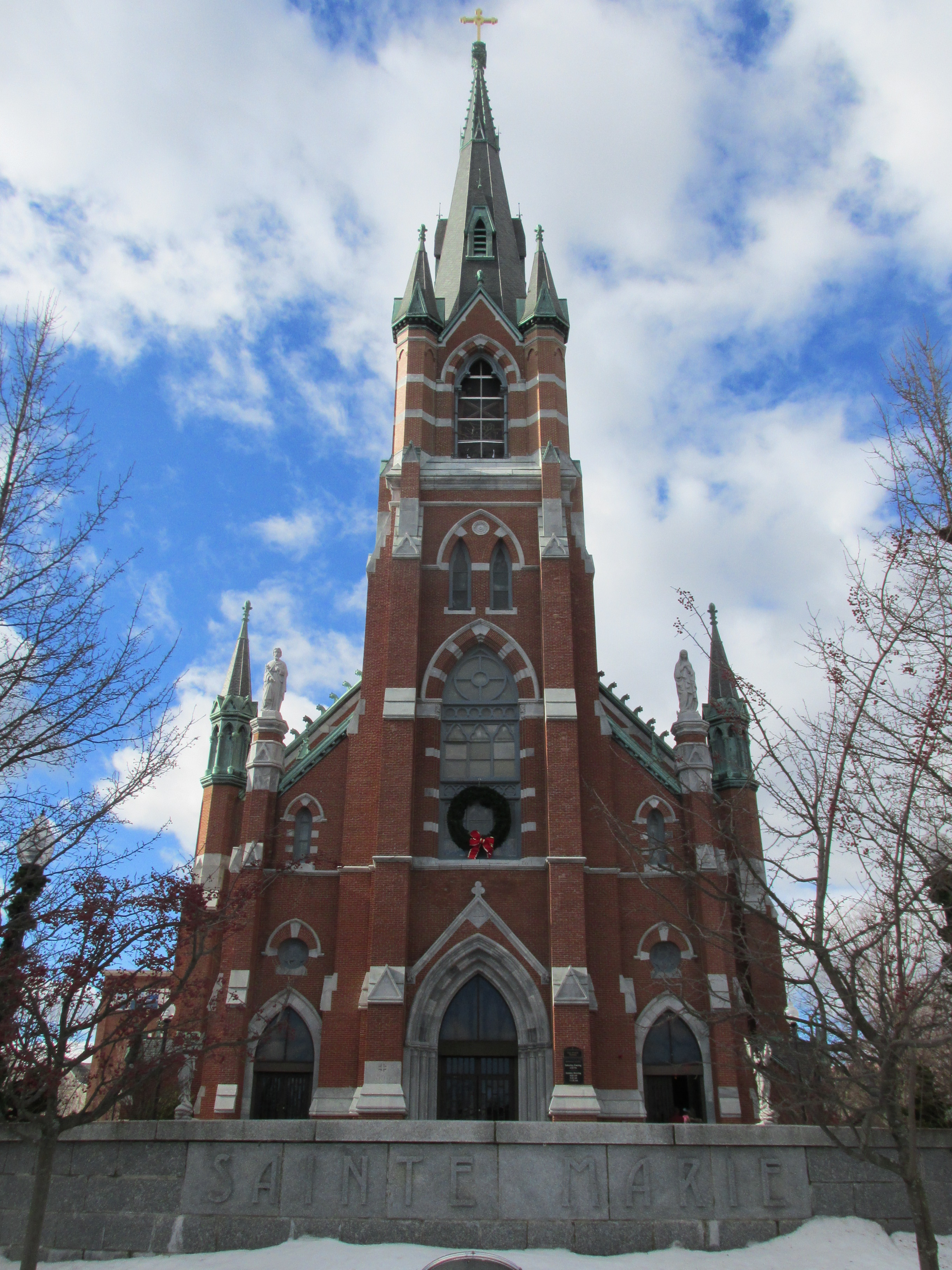
- Ste. Marie Church

- Location within New Hampshire Location within the United States
- Location: 350 & 378 Notre Dame Ave.; 133 Wayne St.; 279 & 281 Cartier St.; Manchester, New Hampshire
- Coordinates: 42.9923°N 71.4759°W
- NRHP reference No.: 100004416
- Added to NRHP: September 13, 2019

The Sainte Marie Roman Catholic Church Parish Historic District, located in the city of Manchester, New Hampshire, United States, includes seven red brick buildings dating from the late 19th century and 20th century. The district was placed on the National Register of Historic Places in September 2019.

Included within the district are:

- Holy Angels School and Convent, built in 1885. This building served as the parish elementary school, and most recently was home for over 40 years to the Ste. Marie Childcare Center which closed in June 2026. It now contains religious education classrooms, meeting spaces, and the youth group which meets on the top two floors.
- Ste. Marie Church, built during the 1890s, after a fire destroyed the original church. It houses four bells from Louviers, France, and features a 224-foot (68 m) spire
- Marist Brothers Home, built in 1905. This building is now known as Joseph House, and houses the sisters of Daughters of Mary, Mother of Healing Love.
- Sisters Home and convent, built in 1907. This building contains the Parish Offices, meeting rooms, and a perpetual adoration chapel.
- Rectory building, built in 1911
- Hevey School, built in 1911–12 and named for Monsignor Pierre Hevey, second pastor of Ste. Marie (A Gymnasium was added to the school in 1966. The school was also renovated at this time) This building was the parish high school, and later became Westside Catholic Regional School. Today it houses Holy Family Academy (New Hampshire), a private Catholic school serving students in grades 7-12.
- A concrete garage for priests who reside in the rectory was built in 1954

== See also ==
- National Register of Historic Places listings in Hillsborough County, New Hampshire
- America's Credit Union Museum, also located on Notre Dame Avenue in Manchester
- Ste. Marie Church (Manchester, New Hampshire)
- Holy Family Academy (New Hampshire), located in the Hevey School
- Monsignor Pierre Hevey, second pastor of Ste. Marie Parish
- Roman Catholic Diocese of Manchester
