= West Side, Manchester, New Hampshire =

Area in the city of Manchester, New Hampshire

Coordinates: 42°59′42″N 71°28′54″W

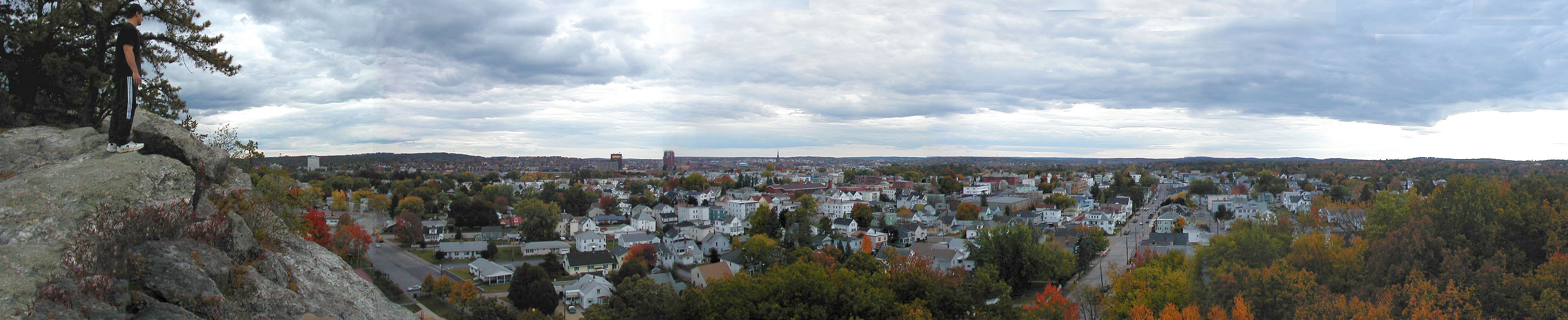
West Side neighborhood from Rock Rimmon cliffs

The West Side is a large area defining many neighborhoods in the city of Manchester, New Hampshire, in the United States. It consists of all parts of the city that lie west of the Merrimack River and includes the neighborhoods of Northwest Manchester, Rimmon Heights, Notre Dame, Piscataquog, Wolfe Park, and Mast Road. It lies just to the east of the community of Pinardville in the neighboring town of Goffstown.

While much of the West Side was historically dominated by French Canadian neighborhoods like Notre Dame and Rimmon Heights, the area was also home to other ethnic groups, including the city's largest German neighborhood in Piscataquog. It has become increasingly diverse, but is still largely associated with the city's French Canadian heritage.

Most of the developed areas of the West Side are high density urban neighborhoods, but the outer neighborhoods of Northwest Manchester, Wolfe Park, and Mast Road are medium to suburban.

== History ==
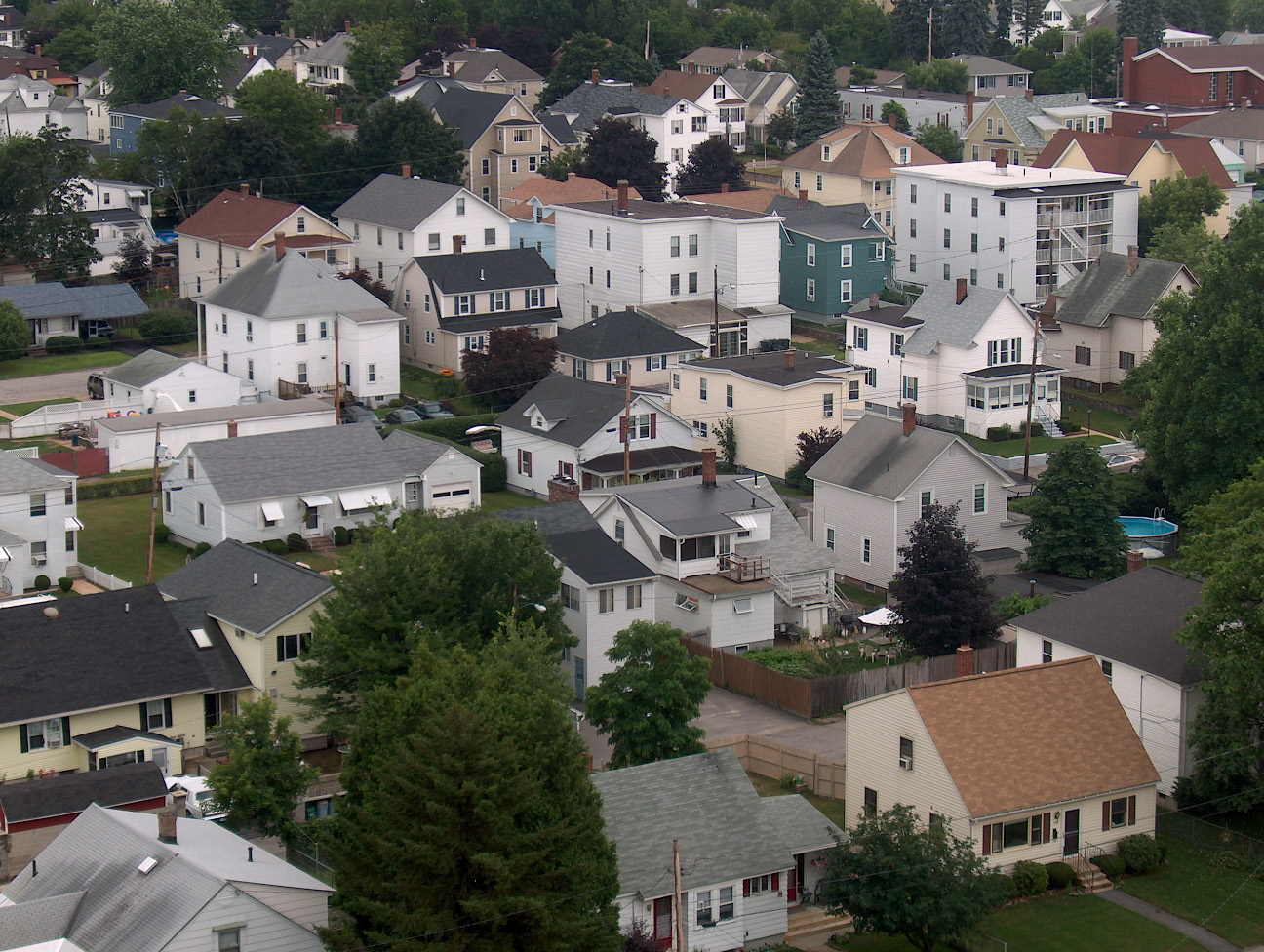
West Side neighborhood - closeup from Rock Rimmon

The lower area of Notre Dame, immediately west of present-day downtown Manchester, was originally known as McGregorville, after the McGregor family that built the first bridge in the city in 1792. The area later grew into a dense neighborhood called the Flat Iron District beneath Rimmon Heights and adjacent to the western side of the Amoskeag millyard.

Pisctaquog was originally part of the neighboring town of Bedford, and developed as an industrial area around the confluence of the Piscataquog and Merrimack rivers in the early nineteenth century. The contrast between the urban area, then known as 'Sqoug Village, and the otherwise rural town of Bedford led local residents to request annexation by the city of Manchester, which the General Court granted in 1853.

Rimmon Heights developed later in the nineteenth century when a streetcar line extended up the hill and along Kelley Street, which remains the center of economic activity in the neighborhood today. Mast Road and Wolfe Park also developed as more typical streetcar suburbs along the lines extending to Goffstown Village and the Bedford town line.

The two major economic centers on the West Side, Granite Square and the Flat Iron District, were entirely demolished between the 1960s and early 1980s as part of urban renewal projects. The much larger Flat Iron District was replaced with a suburban-style shopping center, which is now mostly vacant, an elderly housing high-rise and an expansion of Catholic Medical Center. A second elderly housing high-rise and semi-urban shopping center followed a fire, road widening and the construction of a highway interchange in the Granite Square area.

The West Side has begun to rebound from the effects of urban renewal in recent years. Rimmon Heights became the pilot neighborhood for the city's Neighborhood Initiatives in 2006. Around the same time, neighborhood centers in Wolfe Park and Rimmon Heights were rezoned to encourage traditional neighborhood development, and new landscaping and pedestrian amenities were provided along the Granite Street gateway to downtown and the West Side. The Piscataquog Trail, a recreational rail trail that opened in 2006, crosses much of the West Side and connects to downtown Manchester via a pedestrian bridge over the Merrimack River. Recent private development has included the expansion of Catholic Medical Center along both sides of McGregor Street, the planned new headquarters of St. Mary's Bank and conversion of a former Amoskeag mill into high-end housing in the Notre Dame area, as well as several smaller projects in Rimmon Heights.

== Areas of interest ==
- America's Credit Union Museum - museum housed in the original location of St. Mary's Bank, the first credit union in the United States
- Catholic Medical Center - hospital
- Majestic Theatre - community theater
- Lafayette and Simpson Parks - neighboring parks at the heart of the West Side overlooking downtown Manchester
- Manchester High School West - one of Manchester's high schools
- Piscataquog Trail - recreational rail trail through West Side from Pinardville to downtown Manchester
- Rock Rimmon - a large cliff with a view of most of Manchester
- Ste. Marie Church - a large Gothic Revival church that dominates the West Side
- West Side Arena - ice rink

== Parks ==
- Black Brook Park
- Cullerot Park
- Gossler Park
- Lafayette Park
- Martineau Park
- Piscataquog Park
- Raco-Theodore Park
- Rock Rimmon Park
- Simpson Park
- Sweeney Park
- Wolfe Park
