= Little Canada (term) =

Ethnic enclaves in the United States

Little Canada (French: le petit Canada) is a name for any of the various communities where French Canadians congregated upon emigrating to the United States, in particular New England, in the 19th and early 20th centuries. A variant of Canadian French known as New England French is still spoken in parts of New England.

== History ==
Some early emigrants relocated to the United States because they had chosen to side with the Americans during the American Revolution. Parish archives of Old St. Joseph's Church in Philadelphia record trips made by Jesuit Father Ferdinand Steinmeyer (Father Farmer) to the Revolutionary War depot near Fishkill, New York, where he baptized over a dozen children of French-Canadian and Acadian parents. Most of the men were members of the 1st Canadian Regiment of the Continental Army, recruited in 1775 by James Livingston in anticipation of an invasion of northeastern Quebec. As the expedition failed, they, their families, and the American militias were driven out of Canada.

Approximately 900,000 French-Canadians emigrated to the United States in the period of 1840-1930 as part of the Quebec diaspora. The vast majority of these francophones settled in the six New England states: Connecticut, Maine, Massachusetts, New Hampshire, Rhode Island and Vermont, as well as northern New York state.

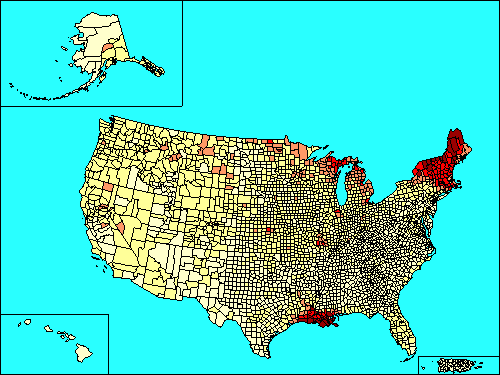
Distribution of French Americans according to the 2000 census

Emigrants moved to states close to Quebec, particularly those bordering the province, because of their generally impoverished condition and lack of jobs as a result of a poor economy over-reliant on agriculture. In the 19th century, the United States was one of the most industrialised and prosperous nations on earth. The emigrants left behind a traditional rural society to enter an industrial world. Centers of the New England textile and other manufacturing industries such as Lowell, Massachusetts; Gardner, Massachusetts; Holyoke, Massachusetts; Winooski, Vermont; Ludlow, Massachusetts; Manchester, New Hampshire; Lewiston, Maine; and Woonsocket, Rhode Island were major destinations for Quebec laborers.

French Canadians from other provinces often moved elsewhere: those from Ontario typically emigrated to Illinois and Michigan, while those from Manitoba and other Western provinces usually emigrated to Minnesota and Wisconsin. Minneapolis and Saint Paul, Minnesota, boasted a large French Canadian community in 1900.

One of the more famous "Little Canadas" was the West Side of Manchester, New Hampshire, a city with a large French-speaking population due to the recruitment of laborers in Quebec to work in the textile mills in the 19th and 20th centuries. "La Caisse Populaire Ste. Marie", or St. Mary's Bank, located in Manchester's Little Canada, was the first credit union chartered in the United States, specifically founded to serve the French Canadian population. The credit union, or "people's bank" ("la caisse populaire") was a financial institution pioneered in Quebec by Quebecers who had difficulty obtaining credit from banks controlled by anglophone Canadians.

The most noted resident of Manchester's "petit Canada" was Grace Metalious, author of the best-selling novel Peyton Place. Metalious denied her French Canadian heritage and mostly lived in non-French Canadian neighborhoods in Manchester, due to her mother's desire to avoid prejudice. During World War II, Metalious eventually had to live in Little Canada after her husband went off to war due to a housing shortage.

In contrast, novelist Robert Cormier of Leominster, Massachusetts, highlighted the culture of fictitious but representative Little Canadas in New England in many of his works, notably "Frenchtown Summer."

Revlon founder Charles Revson, of Russian-Jewish extraction, grew up in a cold-water tenement in Manchester's Little Canada.

Other prominent Little Canadas were found in Lowell, Massachusetts, the home of novelist Jack Kerouac, and Lewiston, Maine. Another notable Franco-American community sprang up in Fall River in southeastern Massachusetts. As a result, a number of cultural and charitable organizations, such as the Franco-American Civic League, the Club Richelieu, La Fédération Catholique Franco-Américaine de Fall River, and L'Association Culturelle Française de Fall River, were founded to foster French language and culture within the Franco-American community.

Today, New England French (essentially a variety of Canadian French) is spoken in parts of New England, in particular Maine.
