= Wolfe Park =

Wolfe Park may refer to

- Wolfe Park, a public park in Monroe, Connecticut
- Wolfe Park (Columbus, Ohio), a neighborhood in Columbus, Ohio
- Wolfe Park (Manchester, New Hampshire), a neighborhood in Manchester, New Hampshire
- Wolfe Park (Town of Chenango, New York), a public park and hiking trails with a waterfall

== See also ==
- Wolf Park, of Battle Ground, Indiana
