= Joseph Boivin =

Co-founder of first U.S. credit union

Attorney Joseph Boivin (September 21, 1866 – July 6, 1930) was a co-founder and first president of the first credit union established in the United States, Ste. Marie's Cooperative Credit Association.

== Early life ==
The son of Stanislas and Marie (Doucet) Boivin, Joseph Auguste Boivin was born September 21, 1866, in Coaticook, Quebec, Canada. Mr. Boivin contracted polio as a child and lost one leg to complications of the illness. He studied at Saint Hyacinthe College, Coaticook, and lived for several years in Saint-Hyacinthe, Quebec. Boivin immigrated to Manchester, New Hampshire, on October 1, 1883. He studied law in the offices of Burnham, Brown, Jones and Warren, and later with Judge George W. Prescott. He was admitted to the New Hampshire Bar in December 1899 and, subsequently, to the Hillsborough County Bar Association. He studied at St. Anselm College in neighboring Goffstown, where he also taught French.

== Career ==
In 1902, Boivin represented Manchester's Ward 9 at the constitutional convention. He served as treasurer for L'Association Canado-American. His law office was located in the Kennard Building, 314–315 Elm Street, Manchester, where he also served as a justice of the peace, insurance agent and real estate broker. He started the credit union on November 24, 1908, through a collaboration with Monsignor Pierre Hevey of Ste. Marie Church and guidance from Alphonse Desjardins, the Canadian credit union pioneer. Boivin volunteered his time in the evenings and, assisted by his wife Emma, an able and experienced bookkeeper, ran it out of his home at 420 Notre Dame Avenue in Manchester. America's Credit Union Museum now occupies the location of his home, where the credit union, now known as St. Mary's Bank, first operated.

Among his many accomplishments, Joseph Boivin served as a school board member and as Commissioner of the Water Department in Manchester. He was a member of the Council Hevey of Union St. Jean Baptiste l'Amerique and of L'Artisans Canadien-Francais, a French professional association. As he was a singer, melophile and Catholic, he sang in the choir at Ste. Marie Church on Notre Dame Avenue. His faith led him to counsel French-Canadian residents of Manchester in financial planning.

== Personal life ==
He married Miss Emma Gilbert of Lewiston, Maine, in September 1901; they had four children between 1902 and 1907: Dominique, Therese, Gilberte and Gertrude.

Boivin suffered with chronic nephritis for several months in 1930; he died at home (420 Notre Dame Avenue) on Sunday, July 6, 1930, of myocarditis. He is buried in the Boivin family lot at Mount Calvary Cemetery in Manchester.

== See also ==
- History of credit unions
- Pierre Hevey
- Edward Filene
- Alphonse Desjardins (co-operator)
- America's Credit Union Museum
