= Louise McCarren Herring =

American banker (1909–1987)

- Born: Louise McCarren; September 20, 1909; Clinton County, Ohio, USA
- Died: November 2, 1987 (aged 78); Cincinnati, Ohio, U.S.
- Resting place: Gate of Heaven Cemetery; Montgomery, Ohio, U.S.
- Education: University of Cincinnati
- Known for: Credit union pioneer
- Spouse: Arthur S. Herring (m. 1939)
- Children: 5

Louise McCarren Herring (September 20, 1909 – November 2, 1987), was an Ohio native, recognized as one of the pioneer leaders of the not-for-profit cooperative credit union movement in the United States. Herring is universally regarded in the United States credit union movement as being the “Mother of Credit Unions” for her work with the movement since its earliest days.

== Early life ==
Louise McCarren was born to Joseph and Julia (Mahoney) McCarren in Clinton County, Ohio. She graduated from the University of Cincinnati in 1932.

== Career ==
Herring worked in the personnel department of Kroger prior to 1933. Herring also served as the longtime manager of KEMBA (Kroger Employees Mutual Benefit Association) Credit Union in Cincinnati.

=== Banking career ===
Herring was one of the attendees at the 1934 Estes Park, Colorado, meeting that established the Credit Union National Association (better known as CUNA). Also attending the Estes Park meeting were Edward Filene, Claude Clark, and Dora Maxwell. Herring’s commitment to the value of credit unions elevated her to national leader of the movement. Herring is credited with helping to establish five hundred credit unions and was a supporter of the dual share insurance system, helping to establish the private National Deposit Guaranty Corporation, which is now known as American Share Insurance (ASI).

Herring served as the first paid executive secretary of the Ohio Credit Union League (now Ohio Credit Union System) which she co-founded. She was credited with organizing more than 500 credit unions in Ohio and the Midwest. She was a member of the consumer advisory council of the Federal Reserve Bank in Washington, D.C. She was president of the Communicating Arts Credit Union and treasurer of the Cincinnati Central Credit Union at the time of her death.

== Personal life ==
She married Arthur S. Herring on October 21, 1939. They had three sons and two daughters, William A., Joseph G., Robert C., Sister Carren and M. Catherine. She lived in Pleasant Ridge, Cincinnati. She was a member of the Church of the Nativity in Pleasant Ridge.

Herring died on November 2, 1987, at Good Samaritan Hospital in Cincinnati, Ohio. She was buried at the Gate of Heaven Cemetery in Montgomery, Ohio.

== Awards and legacy ==
In 1978, the Ohio legislature recognized Herring as the "Mother of the Ohio Credit Union Movement". Herring was inducted into the National Cooperative Business Association's Cooperative Hall of Fame in 1983. She was named to the Ohio Women's Hall of Fame in 1986. In 1987, she received the YWCA Career Achievement Award.

CUNA annually awards the Louise Herring Award for Philosophy in Action, which recognizes those credit unions which “demonstrate the exceptional effort to integrate credit union philosophy” (not for profit but for service) into the daily operations of their credit unions and recognize their commitment to superior service to their member/owners. The Ohio Credit Union System tri-annually awards the Louise McCarren Herring Lifetime Achievement Award to those individuals who have demonstrated a lifetime dedication to the advancement of the credit union movement in Ohio.

== See also ==
- History of credit unions
