= Granite State Credit Union =

State-chartered bank in Manchester, New Hampshire

Coordinates: 42°59′54.0″N 71°27′49.1″W

- Formerly: Utility Workers Credit Union
- Founded: 1945
- Headquarters: Manchester, New Hampshire
- Website: www.gscu.org

Granite State Credit Union (GSCU) is a state-chartered credit union based in Manchester, New Hampshire, with branches throughout the state.

GSCU is a member of the New Hampshire Credit Union League (NHCUL) and Credit Union National Association (CUNA).

== Membership ==
Originally chartered as Utility Workers Credit Union, the credit union initially served public service company employees and those of the Manchester Transit Authority.

The credit union was renamed in 1972. At that time, the charter was expanded so that anyone who lived in New Hampshire could be a member.

== Origins ==
The organization was founded by John Edward Grace (1911- 1974) of Manchester in 1945, with a deposit of $15 dollars. Grace had been previously employed as a Manchester, NH city bus driver. His strong leadership, based on the trust of the community he served, led to solid support for the credit union. His wife, Elizabeth ("Betty") Grace (1913- 2005) was instrumental in making Utility Worker's Credit Union a success. She served as the organization's only other employee in the role of "Bookkeeper," up to the time of Mr. Grace's unfortunate final illness that caused him to resign his post of Manager/Treasurer, a leadership position he enjoyed from 1945-1973.

A special exhibit at the America's Credit Union Museum on Notre Dame Avenue in Manchester, New Hampshire, includes a display panel dedicated to John Grace's life, personal artifacts, and a copy of a memoir of his life, Profile of the Life and Times of John Edward Grace (1911-1974): Credit Union Founder/Organizer, written by Patricia Cummings (his daughter) in 2006 and published by her company, , Concord, New Hampshire.

In late 2003 or early 2004, the Acorn Credit Union merged with Granite State Credit Union.

The credit union lends to businesses through Octant Business Services LLC, a credit union service organization in Marlborough, Massachusetts.
