= History of credit unions =

Credit unions are not-for-profit financial cooperatives. In the early stages of development of a nation's financial system, unserved and underserved populations had to rely on risky and expensive informal financial services from sources like money lenders, ROSCAs and saving at home. Credit unions proved they could meet demand for financial services that banks could not: from professional, middle class and poorer people. Those that served poorer urban and rural communities became an important source of microfinance.

The first working credit union models sprang up in Germany in the 1850s and 1860s, and by the end of the 19th Century had taken root in much of Europe. They drew inspiration from cooperative successes in other sectors, such as retail and agricultural marketing (see history of the cooperative movement). Similar institutions were independently developed somewhat earlier in Japan, in the early 19th century, by agrarian reformer and economist Ninomiya Sontoku. In these village unions, known as gojōkō (五常講), each person of the village union could borrow fund interest free for 100 days, while the entire membership shared the cost in case of default. The language related to credit unions can be confusing. In spite of the word 'credit' in their name, even the earliest credit unions usually offered both savings and credit services, and often payment and insurance services as well. And they were known by (and are still known by) a wide range of names, for example: 'people's banks', 'cooperative banks' and 'credit associations'.

Credit unions are best identified by their adherence to cooperative principles, especially related to membership and control. For example, after World War II many organizations were started by and/or controlled by governments in the developing world, and were described as 'credit unions' or 'cooperatives' by their promoters. However, government control, whether in a capitalist or communist political context, represents a fundamental repudiation of cooperative principles.

== Origins ==
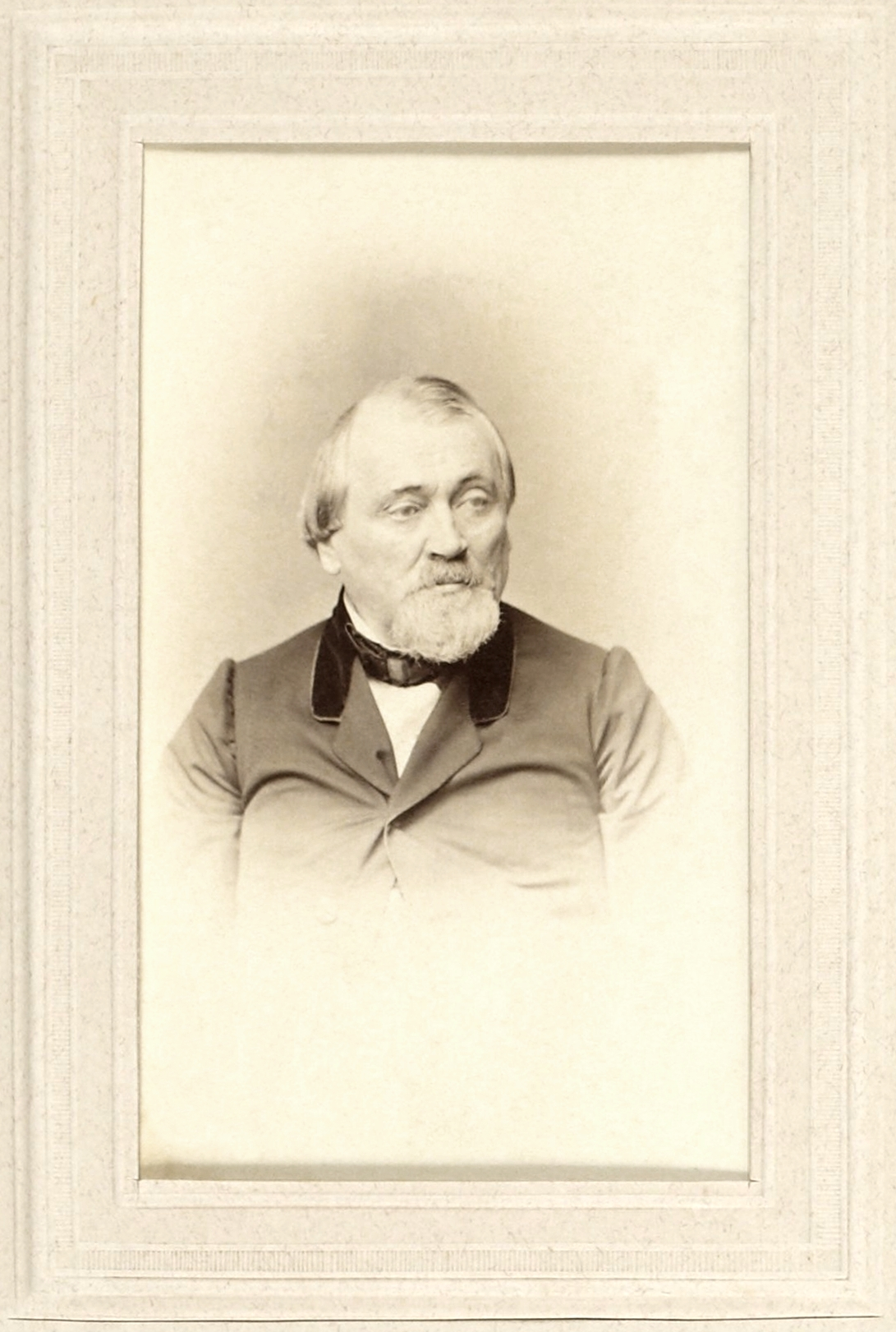
Hermann Schulze-Delitzsch

"Spolok Gazdovský" (The Association of Administrators or The Association of Farmers) founded in 1845 by Samuel Jurkovič, was the first cooperative in Europe (credit union). The cooperative provided a cheap loan from funds generated by regular savings for members of the cooperative. Members of cooperative had to commit to a moral life and had to plant two trees in a public place every year. Despite the short duration of its existence, until 1851, it thus formed the basis of the cooperative movement in Slovakia. Slovak national thinker Ľudovít Štúr said about the association: "We would very much like such excellent constitutions to be established throughout our region. They would help to rescue people from evil and misery. A beautiful, great idea, a beautiful excellent constitution!"

The first successful credit unions began in Germany under the leadership of cooperative pioneer Hermann Schulze-Delitzsch. These credit unions would be recognizable today, since they adhered to the basic aspects of the co-operative identity: that is, they were "based on the values of self-help, self-responsibility, democracy, equality, equity and solidarity. In the tradition of their founders, co-operative members believe in the ethical values of honesty, openness, social responsibility and caring for others." Schulze-Delitzsch is credited with developing the bond of association which still forms the legal basis for credit unions today.

Unlike many of his contemporaries, Schulze-Delitzsch recognized that the functions of retail lending and purchasing business inputs were best kept separate in the interests of sound cooperative management. In 1852 Schulze-Delitzsch consolidated the learning from two pilot projects, one in Eilenburg and the other in Delitzsch into what are generally recognized as the first credit unions in the world.

Schulze-Delitzsch was an excellent organizer and advocate for the credit union idea. "Wherever he went, new people's banks sprang up ... by 1859 there were 183 with 18,000 members in Posen and Saxony."

Schulze focused much of his attention on developing federations or trade associations to help protect the brand of these small organizations, ensure their stability and link them to the global banking system. As a member of the Prussian House of Representatives and the German Reichstag he secured passage of a national credit union law in 1871. By 1912 the people's banks he founded had 641,000 members.

== Rural credit unions ==
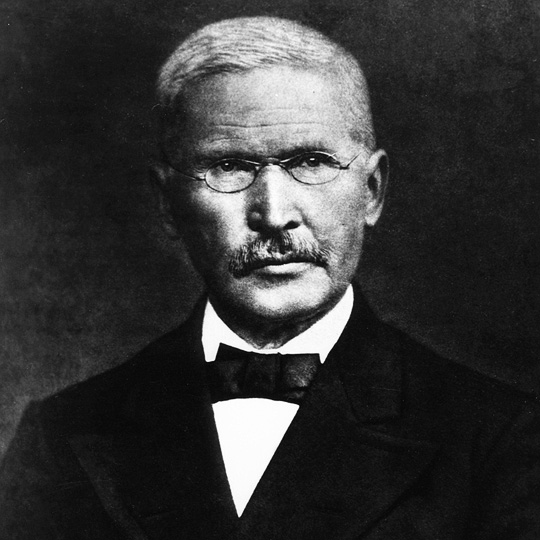
Raiffeisen was successively Bürgermeister of three German municipalities.

While Schulze's credit unions were situated in urban areas and served traders, shop owners and artisans, Friedrich Wilhelm Raiffeisen founded the first rural credit union in the village of Heddesdorf (now a suburb of Neuwied) in Germany. Raiffeisen's approach built on many aspects of Schulze's, but with significant modifications that had important implications for microfinance.

Most of these differences reflected the differences between the markets the two types of credit unions served. Members of Raiffeisen's credit unions were generally poorer than their urban counterparts. Many were ex-serfs, freed in various parts of Germany between 1800 and 1848. They had smaller, more seasonal and less predictable income flows. This made it difficult to rely on standard loan repayment arrangements. The small size of the credit unions, combined with extremely low educational endowments among the people, presented important management challenges.

While Schulze could rely largely on a commercial approach, Raiffeisen's approach addressed the unique problems of the rural poor largely by exploiting the strong bonds of solidarity (known today as social capital) and deep Christian values in the typical village. For example, to make up for the very small and irregular availability of cash in rural communities, credit unions expected their directors to serve in a voluntary capacity, with only the cashier receiving a small stipend. Priests, teachers and other educated villagers were often inspired to serve by the cooperative values advanced by Raiffeisen's movement.

The two leaders and their movements squared off in several bitter debates. Schulze repeatedly argued that because the Raiffeisen credit unions relied on only one paid staff person – a cashier – they were unsafe. The evidence never supported this allegation, however. And Raiffeisen strongly opposed efforts by Schulze to limit the liability of credit union members, because he felt that such limits would dilute bonds of association and the power of the rural banks to fund their loans from the savings of local members.

In spite of this acrimony, by 1913 over 2 million Germans were members of credit unions. Of these, 80% lived in communities with less than 3,000 people. Their participation contradicted the arguments of skeptics who argued that poor people couldn't be relied on to repay their loans, and that no bank could make a profit serving poor Germans.

== "A Totally Different Sovereign" ==
A key problem in microfinance is that it takes nearly ten times as much work and cost to assess, process and manage ten loans worth $1,000, as it does to assess, process and manage one loan worth $10,000. The total income for the financial institution from these two cases is likely to be similar if not identical. There is a cut-off in loan and deposit sizes below which banks lose money on each transaction they make. Poor people usually fall below this cut-off. In addition, most poor people have few assets that can be secured by a bank as collateral. As documented extensively by Hernando de Soto and others, even if they happen to own land in the developing world, they may not have effective title to it.

To address this problem, Schulze's credit unions introduced the concept of the bond of association. This type of bond, which drew on informal systems of lending like ROSCAs, was developed fully in Raiffeisen's village credit unions, helping to reduce the costs and risks of lending to people of good character but limited means. By bringing people together in pursuit of a common goal, it also strengthened local communities. An early credit union historian describes the impact this way:

It is quite true, as Dr. Johnson unkindly reminded Goldsmith, that it takes 240 poor men’s pence to make one capitalist’s sovereign. But once the sovereign is so put together, it is a totally different sovereign from that taken out of the rich man’s purse. It has behind it 240 wills, 240 pairs of watchful eyes, 240 thinking brains. It has, so to speak, become an animate sovereign, with prudence, energy, vigilance, diffused throughout all its parts. Every spring, every wire of the composite machine takes a personal interest in the collective doings, watching the other parts, guarding against loss and waste, correcting the slightest irregularity.

In other words, the Raiffeisen Banks capitalized on the social dynamics of rural neighbourhoods to overcome barriers to service delivery. A villager who chose not to repay a loan could face social disgrace, sanctions in church and/or severe economic consequences like losses of opportunities to work. In contrast to the credit unions, urban banks that lacked these local information and enforcement advantages could not profitably serve this market.

Bonds of association were an important innovation in microfinance, anticipating the solidarity lending methodology later made famous by Grameen Bank in Bangladesh.

== Federations and auditing associations ==
The federating approach marked a distinctive departure from conventional thinking about economies of scale in business. Traditional businesses achieved scale through a single, centralized head-office with power delegated to branches.

The cooperative model inverted this method, instead scaling up one of its founding principles: individual cooperation between members. Individual credit unions delegated specific powers for specific purposes to a federal body, with residual powers remaining in local hands. By respecting the principles of democratic control and subsidiarity credit union leaders were able to achieve vast economies of scale without surrendering local autonomy.

Compared to Schulze's urban credit unions, the village banks of Raiffeisen were smaller and had to rely on much more limited human resources. This made them very vulnerable to fraud and mismanagement, and (independently of any actual problems) very vulnerable to public skepticism.

To address these problems the credit unions formed auditing associations. "Some of the auditor's responsibility was simply auditing, but much took a more constructive role, providing the local cooperatives with helpful materials and eventually setting up formal training courses for cooperative managers." This dual role emerged from private sector incentives and was funded from within the movement, by user fees charged to the credit unions.

== Credit union movement spreads ==
Even before they had fully consolidated in Germany, credit unions began spreading across Europe.

In 1864 Léon d'Andrimont formed the first of many 'people's banks' in Belgium, in Liège.

In 1865 Luigi Luzzatti, the 'Schulze-Delitzsch' of Italy, founded the first credit union there: the People's Bank of Milan.

In 1872 the Co-operative Wholesale Society in England formed a retail deposit and loan department, which eventually transformed into The Co-operative Bank familiar there today.

In 1878 a network of 'people's banks' formed the Groupe Banque Populaire, and four years later the first credit union in the system now known as Crédit Mutuel was formed in Wantzenau, near Strasbourg.

In 1883 Leone Wollemborg, the 'Raiffeisen' of Italy, formed the first casse rurali in Loreggia.

Credit unions also spread to Austria, Switzerland, Hungary, the Netherlands and the Balkans by the 1890s.

By 1889 the movement had spread to Baroda state in British India, where the Anyonya Co-operative Bank Limited was formed.

== From Europe to America ==
The first credit union in North America, the Caisse populaire de Lévis in Quebec, Canada, began operations on Jan. 23, 1901, with a ten cent deposit. Founder Alphonse Desjardins, a reporter in the Canadian parliament, was moved to take up his mission in 1897 when he learned of a Montrealer who had been ordered by the court to pay nearly $5,000 in interest on a loan of $150 from a moneylender. Drawing extensively on European precedents, Desjardins developed a distinctive parish-based model for Quebec: the caisse populaire.

In the United States, St. Mary's Bank of Manchester, New Hampshire, holds the distinction as the first credit union. Assisted by a personal visit from Desjardins, St. Mary's Cooperative Credit Association (now named St. Mary's Bank) was founded by French-speaking immigrants to Manchester from the Maritime Provinces of Canada on November 24, 1908. As the leader of St. Marie's church, Monsignor Pierre Hevey was instrumental in establishing this credit union. Attorney Joseph Boivin managed the credit union, as a volunteer, out of his home in the evenings. America's Credit Union Museum now occupies the location of Boivin's home, where St. Mary's Bank first operated.

Pierre Jay, a central banker and Edward Filene, a Bostonian merchant and philanthropist, were instrumental in establishing enabling legislation in Massachusetts in 1908.

Filene's philanthropy, combined with the practical implementation efforts of his associate Roy Bergengren were critical to the emergence of credit unions across the United States. Unlike the credit unions of Germany or Quebec, most credit unions in the US emerged from an employer-based bond of association. In addition to the traditional information and enforcement advantages resulting from the fact that members shared the same workplace, the employer-based bond permitted credit unions to use future paychecks as collateral.

The Credit Union National Extension Bureau, the forerunner of the Credit Union National Association was formed as a confederation of state leagues at a meeting in Estes Park, Colorado, in 1934. Attendees at the meeting included Dora Maxwell who would go on to help establish hundreds of credit unions and programs for the poor in her lifetime and Louise McCarren Herring, whose work to form credit unions and ensure their safe operation earned the title of "Mother of Credit Unions" in the United States.

In 1932 Bergengren, at the invitation of Canadian priest and adult educator Moses Coady, drafted a model credit union law for the English-speaking province of Nova Scotia. The law was ratified in the provincial legislature the same year, and credit unions rapidly spread to the other Anglophone provinces. The development tools used by the Antigonish Movement led by Coady injected a much stronger populist tone in credit union development, and these methods were spread widely in the developing world after World War II.

Many credit unions formed under specific charters to serve workplace-defined memberships, like John Deere Employees Credit Union (now Veridian Credit Union) in 1934 and Roanoke Postal Employees Federal Credit Union (now Blue Eagle Credit Union) in 1948. Today, it's more common for credit unions to determine membership eligibility geographically by defining their service areas.

== Bibliography ==
- Friedrich Wilhelm Raiffeisen. The Credit Unions. Fifth (1887) edition, translated from the German by Konrad Engelmann. Raiffeisen Printing & Publishing Company, Neuwied on the Rhine, Germany, 1970
- Henry W. Wolff. People's Banks: A Record of Social and Economic Success. P.S. King & Son, London, 1910.
- Ian MacPherson. Hands Around the Globe: A History of the International Credit Union Movement and the Role and Development of World Council of Credit Unions, Inc. Horsdal & Schubart Publishers & WOCCU, Victoria, Canada 1999.
- J. Carroll Moody & Gilbert C. Fite. The Credit Union Movement: Origins and Development 1850-1980. Kendall/Hunt Publishing Company, Dubuque, Iowa, 1984.
- Moses Coady. Masters of Their Own Destiny. Harper & Brothers Publishers, New York, 1939.
- Roy F. Bergengren, Credit Union North America. Southern Publishers Inc., New York, 1940.
- Roy F. Bergengren, CUNA Emerges. Credit Union National Association, Madison, Wisconsin, 1935.

== See also ==
- Cooperative banking
- World Council of Credit Unions
- History of the cooperative movement
- Credit unions in the United Kingdom
