= Ann Bamford =

Irish abolitionist in the USA

- Born: C. 1780; Ireland
- Died: 1863; New Hampshire
- Known for: Anti-slavery work from 1842 to 1858

Ann Bamford (c.1780–1863) was a prominent abolitionist in New Hampshire in the mid-1800s.

== Biography ==
Ann Bamford was an Irish immigrant who emigrated to Canada before moving on to the United States with her husband. She was responsible for getting at least 42 enslaved people into Canada between 1842 and 1858 as part of the Underground Railroad. She lived in Manchester, New Hampshire, and is believed to have hidden the people in her home for several days at a time.

In her old age she lived with her daughter and son in law and was buried in Piscataquog Cemetery. Her work was mostly forgotten until members of the African community sent a query to a local newspaper, the Mirror and American, in October 1902 looking for information about her. There was a follow-up the following day triggered by the lack of awareness of her work by those who knew her. She is now remembered through a plaque erected at 860 Elm Street near her home on Manchester Street as part of Black History Month in 2022.
