= Quebec diaspora =

Immigrants from Quebec and descendants

The Quebec diaspora consists of Quebec immigrants and their descendants dispersed over the North American continent and historically concentrated in the New England region of the United States, Ontario, and the Canadian Prairies. The mass emigration out of Quebec occurred in the period between 1840 and the Great Depression of the 1930s.

== United States ==
Approximately 900,000 Quebec residents (French Canadian for the great majority) left for the United States between 1840 and 1930. They were pushed to emigrate by overpopulation in rural areas that could not sustain them under the seigneurial system of land tenure, but also because the expansion of this system was in effect blocked by the "Château Clique" that ruled Quebec under the British administration, who reserved new land developments for the English and the English system of colonization (see Eastern Townships). New England was the preferred destination due to its growing industrialization. About half of the emigrants are reported to have eventually returned to Canada. Often those who stayed organized themselves in communities sometimes known as Little Canadas. A great proportion of Americans of French ancestry trace it through Quebec. Others, particularly in the South, were from Acadia—the Cajuns—and from France directly. Until 1849, the Catholic Church was not allowed to purchase any land or establish any parishes in the Eastern Townships due to English Protestant laws and control. At the initiative of Father Bernard O'Reilley, an Association des Townships was set up in 1848 to promote settlement in the area. In the 1850s, the association purchased lands which it gave to young families of farmers to prevent them from leaving for the United States where it was believed they would ultimately be assimilated.

Certain early American centres of textile manufacturing and other industries attracted significant French-Canadian populations, like Lewiston and other bordering counties in Maine; Fall River, Holyoke, Fitchburg, and Lowell in Massachusetts; Woonsocket in Rhode Island; Manchester in New Hampshire and the bordering counties in Vermont. There was a significant number of French Canadians who moved to the Kankakee, Illinois area from the 1830s through the 1870s, including religious missionaries, establishing communities such as Bourbonnais, St. Anne, St. Georges, Papineau, and L'Erable. There are also sizeable populations of French-Canadian descent in Michigan and Minnesota—who began migrating there when the region was still part of New France.

The Museum of Work and Culture in Woonsocket, Rhode Island, details New England's Quebec diaspora which developed in the 19th and early 20th centuries.

Noteworthy among those whose parents settled in the United States are writer Jack Kerouac, baseball player Nap Lajoie, politicians Mike Gravel and Paul LePage, singers Rudy Vallée and Robert Goulet, Emil Beaulieau, historian Will Durant, and many more.

== Ontario ==
The largest proportion of French-Canadians outside Quebec trace their ancestry to Quebec (except in the Canadian Maritimes, which were settled by the Acadians). Ontario had been part of New France and settlements in the Detroit-Windsor area find their origins in that period.

The development of mining and forestry resources in the northeastern and eastern regions of Ontario at the end of the 19th century and early 20th century attracted a large workforce from Quebec. A great part of today's half a million Franco-Ontarians are the descendants of these Quebec emigrants. The Francophone population of Ontario is today still concentrated mainly in the northeastern and eastern parts of Ontario, close to the border with Quebec, although smaller pockets of Francophone settlement exist throughout the province in areas like Windsor, Welland and Penetanguishene.

== Canadian West ==
While a good number of emigrants were from Quebec or Ontario, it is often Franco-Americans who formed the nucleus of the population in several francophone communities of Western Canada. These populations today self-identify with their province of residence (Franco-Manitobans, Fransaskois, Franco-Albertans or Franco-Columbians).

== See also ==
- Canuck letter
- Diaspora
- French American
- French Canadian
- Little Canada
- The Rise and Fall of English Montreal
