= Granite State Electric Company =

Granite State Electric Company is a regulated company that provides electricity in parts of the American state of New Hampshire. Since 2012, it has been owned by Liberty Utilities. The company is headquartered in Salem, New Hampshire.
