= American Credit Union Mortgage Association =

U.S. trade organization

- Abbreviation: ACUMA
- Type: Trade association
- Legal status: 501(c)(6) nonprofit organization
- Headquarters: Middleton, Wisconsin, U.S.
- Region served: United States
- Website: www.acuma.org

The American Credit Union Mortgage Association (ACUMA) is a U.S. trade organization for credit unions that are involved in the origination and securitization of real estate loans. ACUMA hosts industry conferences, provides testimony and media commentary on real estate-related issues before the United States Congress, produces the ACUMA Pipeline magazine, and coordinates educational initiatives relating to housing finance. The organization is headquartered in Wisconsin.
