= Manchester Transit Authority =

Public transit agency in the U.S

- Founded: 1973
- Headquarters: 110 Elm Street; Manchester, New Hampshire
- Locale: Manchester, New Hampshire
- Service area: Greater Manchester, NH
- Service type: bus service, paratransit, express bus service
- Routes: 13
- Destinations: Greater Manchester, Concord & Nashua, NH
- Hubs: Veterans Park
- Annual ridership: 353,963 (2024)
- Fuel type: Diesel, biodiesel
- Chief executive: Michael Whitten
- Website: mtabus.org

The Manchester Transit Authority (MTA) is a public transportation provider in Manchester, New Hampshire, United States. It was founded in 1973 and operates 13 regular bus routes through the city, including a free downtown circulator. Buses typically operate on an hourly schedule and are arranged in a hub and spoke system that meets downtown at Veterans Park.

Service is generally limited to the city of Manchester, with a few lines extending into the neighboring towns of Bedford, Goffstown, Hooksett and Londonderry, and two express lines running to Concord and Nashua. Since July 2013, the MTA has offered weekday service between Concord and Manchester-Boston Regional Airport, with most trips also stopping at the Center of NH hub in downtown Manchester, from 3:30 a.m. until 12:45 a.m. The neighboring suburb of Bedford contributed funding to the MTA until 2010, and service coverage was significantly reduced within the town the following year. As of 2009, 97% of Manchester residents lived within one-quarter mile of an MTA bus line.

Original MTA logo (1974–2017), still in use on some buses and signage

The MTA is the public successor to Manchester's private bus service, which reached a peak annual ridership of 15.1 million in 1948, and the Manchester Street Railway that existed until 1940. The MTA was created by the City in May 1973, following requests by the private Manchester Transit bus provider for public subsidies. As of 2005, the MTA served an average of 1,905 riders each weekday, though ridership has grown since that time despite budget cutbacks by the city and subsequent service cutbacks. Ridership in 2011 had increased 21% over 2004, growing from 382,979 to 462,109 total rides. Service peaked for the decade in 2009 with 531,961 rides before falling as a result of service cuts in 2010 and recovering slightly in 2011. The general trend during the period, however, has been a growth in ridership. In recent years, the MTA has sought to expand its ridership with new routes, such as the Green DASH and Concord Express, that are aimed at riders who might otherwise choose to drive.

In addition to the 13 public transit routes, the MTA operates the StepSaver paratransit service and two free Shopper Shuttle routes that operate three days a week.

== Routes ==
The Green DASH downtown circulator operates for free as a weekday loop through the Millyard and Downtown every ten minutes during peak hours and every twenty minutes during off-peak hours. Originally, the buses were wrapped with historical images of Manchester. In an effort to boost ridership and publicize the service, the downtown circulator was rebranded as the Green DASH in 2011, and the buses were given a new, green color scheme that no longer obscures the windows and clearly marks them as a free loop bus. The free service is funded through a combination of federal grants and parking revenue. This marks the second attempt by the MTA at offering free transit downtown, following a fourteen-block free-ride zone that began in 1974 but has since been discontinued.

Route 1 operates as a Healthcare Shuttle connecting Elliot Hospital, Doctors Park on Tarrytown Road, Dartmouth-Hitchcock Clinic, Veterans Administration Hospital and the Manchester Mental Health, and is funded through a grant from the FTA.

The MTA also operates several Shopper Shuttles, which run only on select days of the week and are funded by private retailers, but which offer free service mostly targeted at senior citizens.

== Millyard People Mover ==
Several groups in Manchester have advocated for the creation of a modern streetcar system for the Downtown and Millyard areas. The idea was first raised in the early 1990s and was resurrected in 2012 when Dean Kamen proposed it. More concrete plans, proposing a public-private partnership with the New Hampshire Department of Transportation, were put together in 2018 by Kamen's company DEKA, proposing the name Millyard People Mover. The MTA has not yet allocated money for planning or studies as of 2021.
