= Neighborhoods in Manchester, New Hampshire =

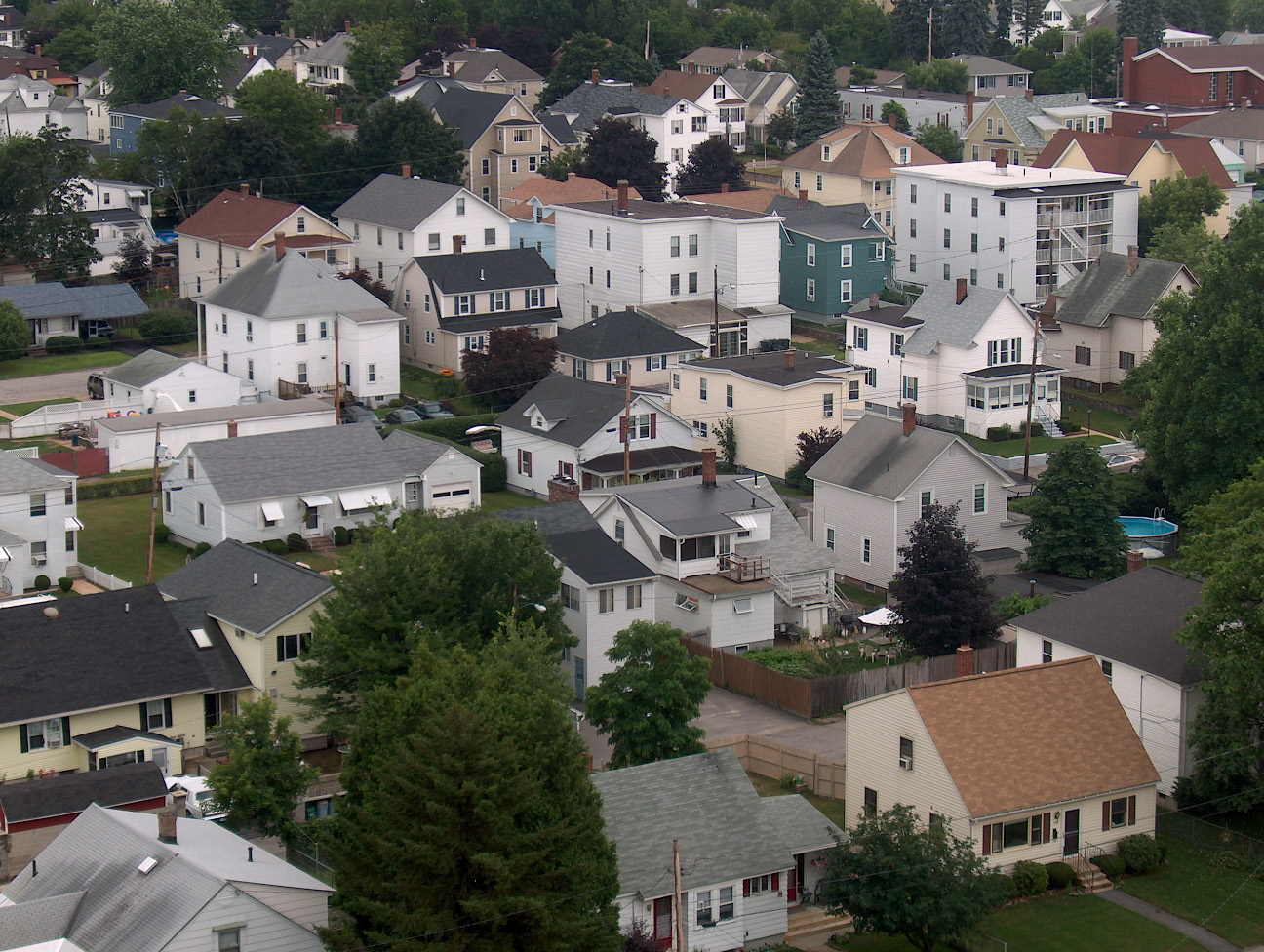
Rimmon Heights neighborhood, Manchester West Side - closeup from top of Rock Rimmon cliff

Manchester, the largest city in New Hampshire, is made up of 25 neighborhoods, according to the Manchester Planning Board in its 2010 master plan. Recognition of particular neighborhoods varies, with some having neighborhood associations, but none have any legal or political authority.

The major neighborhoods, historically, include Amoskeag, Rimmon Heights, Notre Dame/McGregorville and Piscataquog/Granite Square on the West Side; and the North End, Janeville/Corey Square, Hallsville and Bakersville on the East Side; along with Youngsville and Goffes Falls on the periphery of the city.

In 2007, the city began a Neighborhood Initiatives program to "insure that our neighborhoods are vibrant, livable areas since these are the portions of the city where most of the residents spend their time living, playing, shopping and going to school." The purpose of this initiative is to foster vibrancy and redevelopment in the neighborhoods, and to restore the sense of neighborhood communities that had been overlooked in the city for some time. The city began the program with street-scape and infrastructure improvements in the Rimmon Heights neighborhood of the West Side, which has spurred growth and investment in and by the community. Despite the success of the program in Rimmon Heights, it was unclear in recent years how similar programs would be implemented elsewhere in Manchester. The city announced plans for extending the Neighborhood Initiatives program to the Hollow neighborhood in February 2012.

== Downtown ==
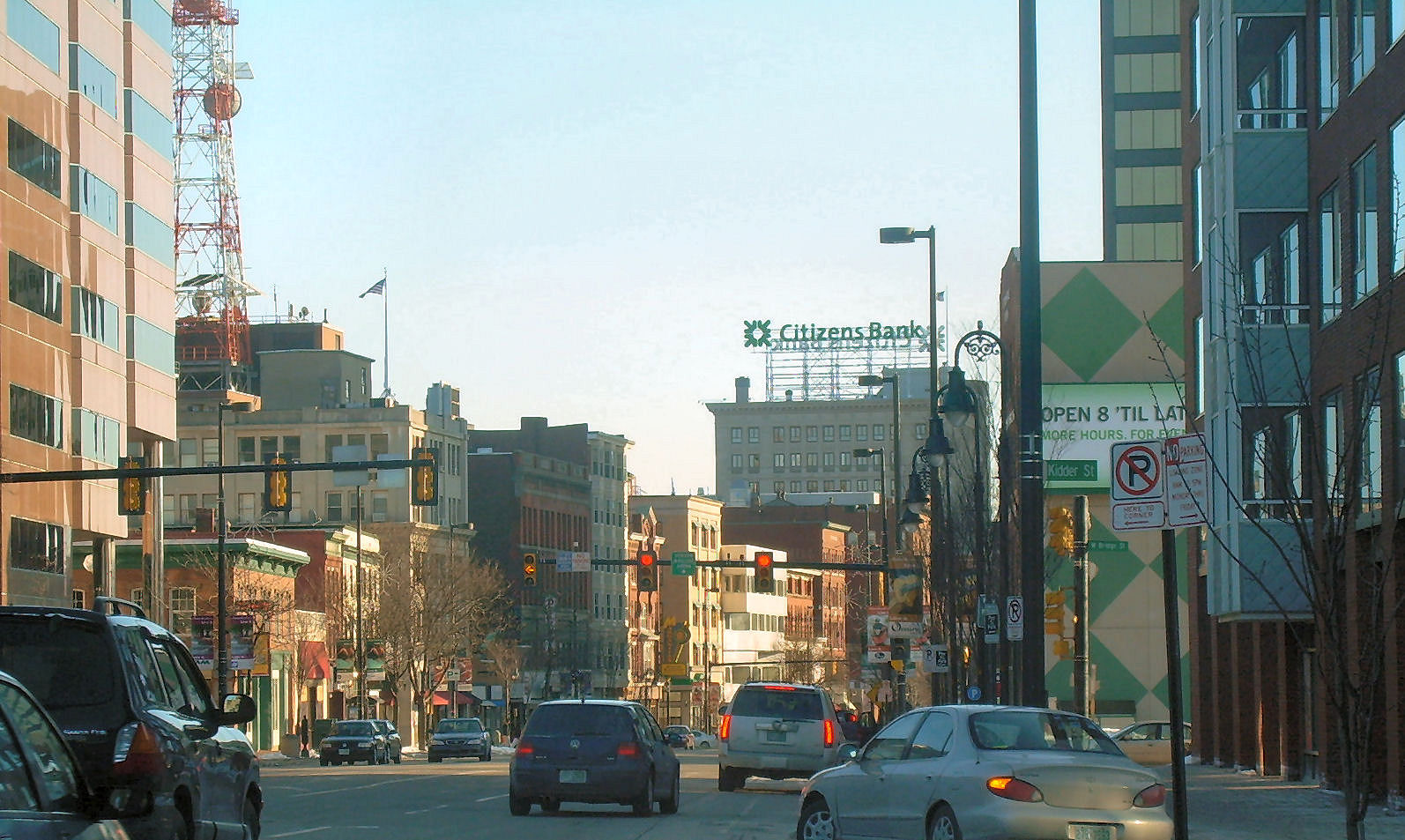
Elm Street from Bridge Street, 2009

Downtown Manchester is the historical, economic and cultural heart of the city, and a center of finance for the state. It is also the focal point for dining and nightlife in the greater Manchester area. Located along the east bank of the Merrimack River, Downtown consists of the downtown core centered along Elm Street between Bridge and Granite streets; the Millyard consisting of the former Amoskeag mills; the "NOB" (North of Bridge); and South Downtown between Granite Street and Queen City Avenue. Within these larger areas are smaller districts, such as the Gaslight and Warehouse districts in Downtown South, the Cultural District centered on the Victory Park Historic District in the Downtown Core, and the River's Edge in South Downtown.

Downtown suffered high vacancy rates following the closure of several downtown-based banks in the early 1990s. It has witnessed a resurgence in recent years, however, including the continual redevelopment of the Amoskeag Millyard and its residential Historic District, and the construction of the SNHU Arena and Northeast Delta Dental Stadium.

In response to the improvements area, Downtown experienced a 19.7% increase in residents between 2000 and 2010. The increasing popularity of downtown living has caused many properties originally built as tenement housing for mill workers in the 19th century to be converted to stylish, eclectic residential condominiums. Many new retail stores and higher education institutions have been uniquely retro-fitted into properties along Commercial Street and Canal Street.

The Millyard is also home to several corporate offices, including Dyn, Deka, Texas Instruments and Eversource Energy New Hampshire.

In addition to the growth in retail, dining, residential and entertainment venues, Downtown has also seen a growth in post-secondary and cultural institutions in recent decades. The Palace Theatre has anchored a revitalized Hanover Street since its reopening in 1973. The New Hampshire Institute of Art is located in the Victory Park National Historic District, and the University of New Hampshire at Manchester concentrated its campus in the Millyard between 1999 and 2001. In 2002, the Massachusetts College of Pharmacy and Health Sciences opened a secondary campus in the NOB.

Downtown is home to northern New England's tallest buildings. City Hall Plaza is the tallest New England building north of Cambridge, Massachusetts, followed closely by the all-black Brady Sullivan Plaza—shorter than City Hall Plaza by only a few feet—both of which are 20 stories high. Other prominent buildings in the Downtown skyline include Manchester's original "skyscraper," the New Hampshire headquarters of Citizens Bank located in the Amoskeag Bank building; Brady-Sullivan Tower, formerly known as New Hampshire Tower; the Carpenter Center; the Wall Street Tower; and Anthem Tower. Viewed from the west and from I-293, the vertical lines of these buildings are contrasted with the massive, horizontal Millyard below them along the banks of the Merrimack River.

== West Side ==
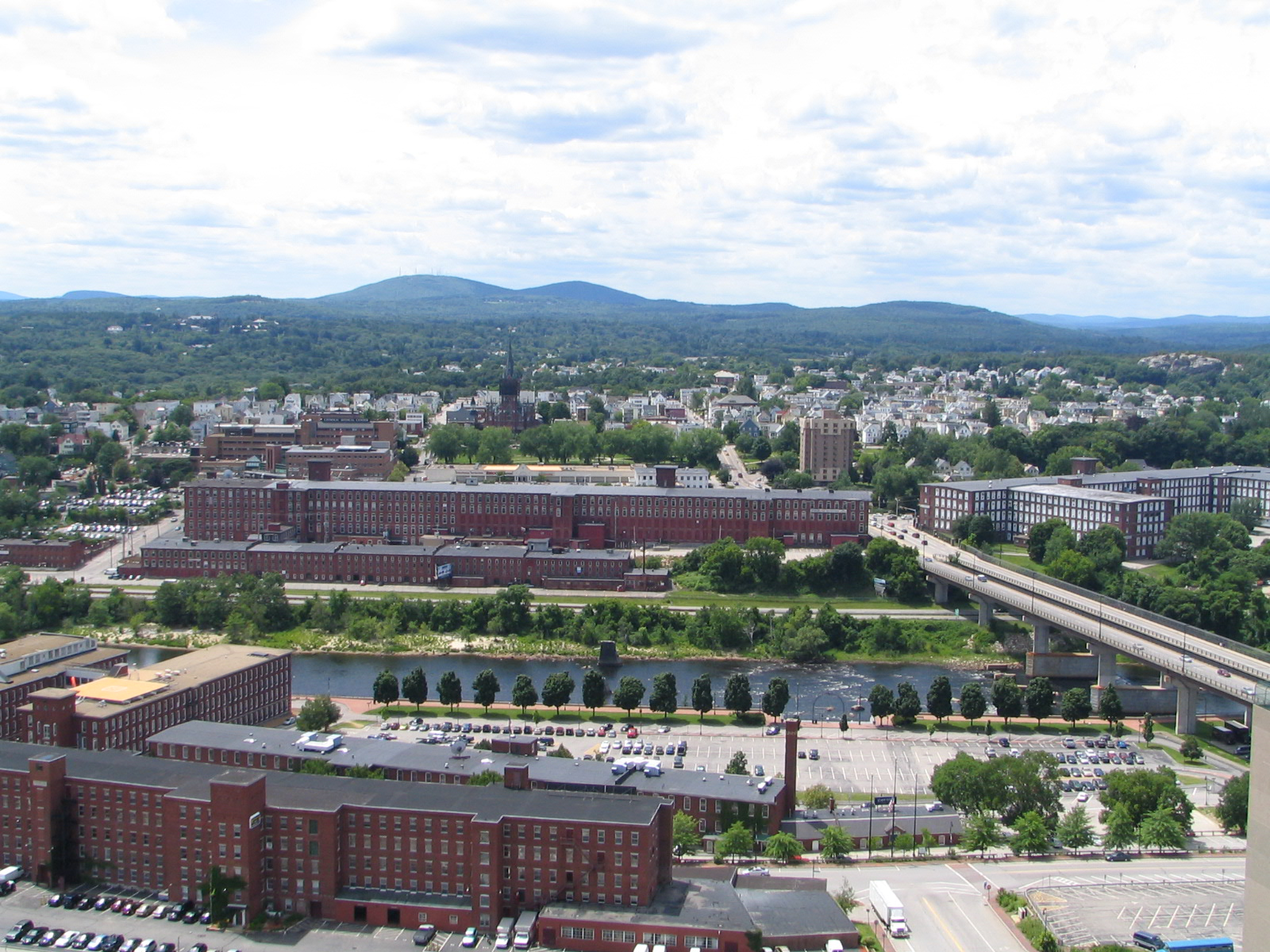
The Millyard (foreground) with Ste. Marie's Church and the West Side in the background

=== Mast Road ===
Mast Road is a mid-density, suburban neighborhood that developed along the original road to Goffstown and prewar streetcar line. St. Anselm College and Pinardville are located outside the city limits along the north edge of the neighborhood.

=== Northwest ===
Northwest is largely suburban neighborhood along Front Street, with the largest swaths of undeveloped land remaining in the city. The neighborhood includes former Amoskeag neighborhood, where the first mills in Manchester once stood. It is also home to the Hackett Hill, including the 602-acre Manchester Cedar Swamp Preserve, which is home to trees over 450 years old. Hackett Hill has been the site of a massive residential development since the early 2000s.

=== Notre Dame ===
Notre Dame is a dense, largely historically French-Canadian neighborhood below Rimmon Heights along McGregor Street and Notre Dame Avenue. Catholic Medical Center and Ste. Marie Church anchor the neighborhood.

=== Piscataquog ===
Piscataquog is a dense residential neighborhood centered on Granite Square and the Piscataquog River.

=== Rimmon Heights ===
Rimmon Heights is a dense, historically primarily French Canadian neighborhood anchored along Kelley and Amory streets. It is the pilot neighborhood for the City's Neighborhood Initiatives program, which began in 2007. Since that time, there have been infrastructure upgrades and retail growth in the neighborhood.

=== Wolfe Park ===
Wolfe Park is a largely suburban neighborhood with greater density around the prewar "A Street" streetcar line and Wolfe Park.

== East Side ==
=== Bakersville ===
Bakersville is located just south of downtown near Baker Brook and Baker Street, and has experienced recent redevelopment, including the Elliot at River's Edge Urgent Care Center. Bakersville Elementary school is located there.

=== Corey Square ===
Corey Square was historically known as Janeville. The angular streets of this densely populated city center neighborhood are unique in deviating from the city's grid.

=== Downtown ===
See Downtown section above.

=== Eaton Heights ===
Eaton Heights is a largely suburban neighborhood that developed along the prewar streetcar line along Hanover Street.

=== Green Acres ===
Green Acres is a largely post-war suburban neighborhood, and is home to Green Acres Elementary and McLaughlin Middle School.

=== Hallsville ===
Hallsville is one of the most densely populated neighborhoods in the city center. It is anchored around the Hollow area, where Massabesic Street breaks with the city's typical grid. The neighborhood is home to Elliot Hospital, Hallsville Elementary School, and the western terminus of the Rockingham Rail Trail.

=== Hanover Hill ===
Hanover Hill is a mid-density neighborhood east of Corey Square. The neighborhood offers commanding views of Downtown and the Uncanoonuc Mountains to the west. It is home to Derryfield Park, one of the signature parks in Manchester.

=== Highlands ===
The Highlands is a largely suburban neighborhood that developed along the prewar streetcar line to Pine Island Park.

=== Kalivas Union ===
Kalivas Union is one of the most densely populated neighborhoods in the city center, and includes much of Valley and Union streets.

=== North End ===
The North End is a historically affluent neighborhood with density and businesses along Webster Street, growing more suburban in the north. It is home to Stark Park, Webster Elementary School, and The Derryfield School. Southern New Hampshire University straddles the boundary between Manchester's North End and the South Hooksett section of the neighboring town of Hooksett.

=== Somerville ===
Somerville is a mid-density neighborhood south of Hallsvile anchored around Somerville and Wilson streets.

=== Southside ===
Southside is a largely postwar suburban neighborhood home to much of the city's suburban-style commercial and retail development along South Willow Street.

=== Straw/Smyth ===
Straw/Smyth is a historically affluent, residential neighborhood home to the Currier Museum of Art.

== Outside the I-93/293 belt ==
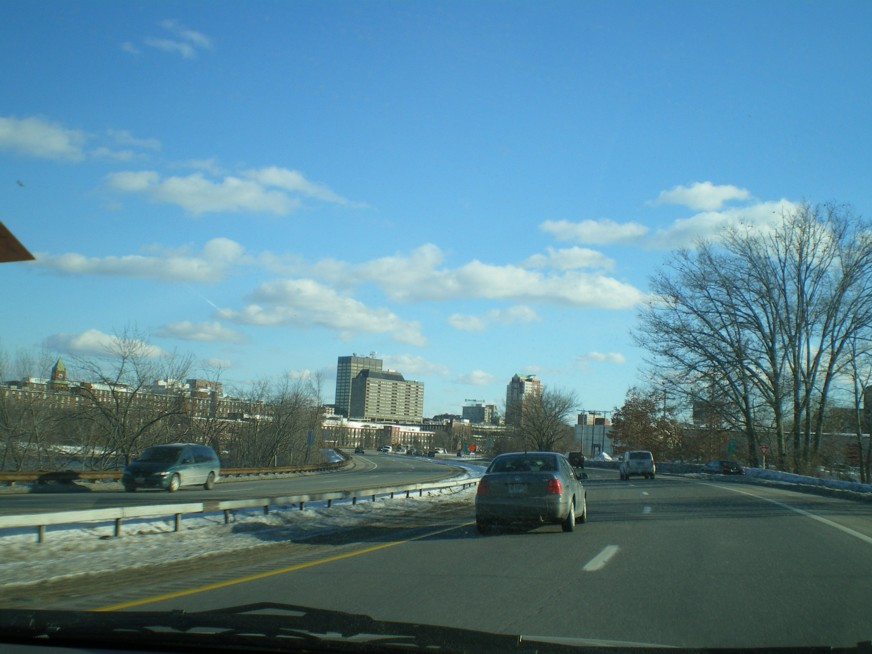
Approaching Downtown Manchester as viewed from the north from I-293

=== Wellington ===
Wellington Rd. Exit 1 Route 101 West

=== Youngsville ===
Candia Rd., Lake Massabesic

=== Southeast ===
Brown Ave. to the Litchfield border

=== Crystal Lake ===
Corning Rd., South Mammoth Rd area

=== Lower South Willow/Airport ===
Lower South Willow is the location of the Mall of New Hampshire and many big-box stores, as well as Manchester-Boston Regional Airport. It is a largely industrial area.

=== Goffes Falls ===
An older neighborhood centered on Cohas Brook, the location of the Goffe's Falls. It has seen much airport development in last 50 years.
