= Holy Family Academy (New Hampshire) =

Location
- 281 Cartier Street; Manchester, (Hillsborough County), New Hampshire 03102; United States
- 42°59′34″N 71°26′57″W

Information
- Type: Private Catholic
- Motto: Ad Veritatem per Fidem et Rationem (To the Truth through Faith and Reason)
- Established: 2000
- Head of school: Mark Gillis
- Chairman of the Board of Trustees: Joseph Williams
- Faculty: 11 full-time, 9 part-time teachers
- Grades: 7-12
- Enrollment: 99 (2019)
- Campus: Urban
- Website: http://www.holyfamilyacademy.org

Holy Family Academy is a co-educational private junior high / high school in Manchester, New Hampshire, teaching in the Roman Catholic classical tradition. In September, 2006, the school was named in the Catholic High School Honor Roll, which lists the top 50 Catholic high schools in the United States. It is independently operated within the Roman Catholic Diocese of Manchester.

Holy Family Academy was founded by a group of parents in 2000. It serves students from the seventh through twelfth grade and employs the Socratic method of teaching.

The school is accredited by the National Association of Private Catholic and Independent Schools (NAPCIS).
