= America's Credit Union Museum =

- Building at 418–420 Notre Dame Ave.
- U.S. National Register of Historic Places
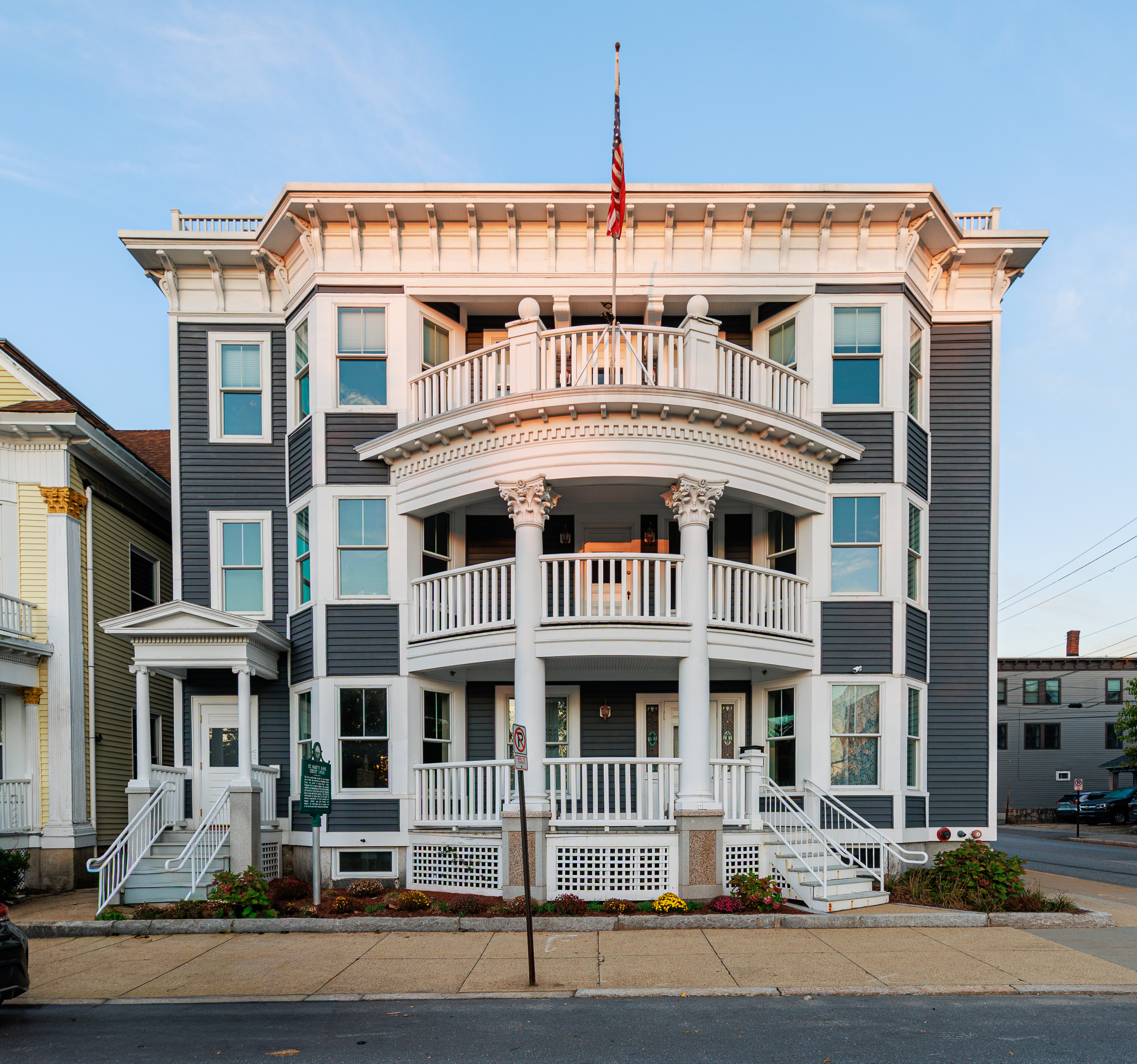

- Location within New Hampshire Location within the United States
- Location: 420 Notre Dame Ave., Manchester, New Hampshire
- Coordinates: 42°59′36″N 71°28′33″W
- Area: less than one acre
- Built: 1907
- Architectural style: Classical Revival
- NRHP reference No.: 96001467
- Added to NRHP: December 20, 1996

America's Credit Union Museum is located in Manchester, New Hampshire, on the site of the first credit union founded in the United States. The museum is housed at the original location for St. Mary's Cooperative Credit Association, renamed in 1925 to La Caisse Populaire Ste.-Marie, or "Bank of the People", St. Mary's. In 1996, the building was listed on the National Register of Historic Places as the Building at 418–420 Notre Dame Ave.

What is now the museum was formerly a three-story, three-family dwelling belonging to Joseph Boivin, the manager of the St. Mary's Cooperative Credit Association. Boivin started the credit union with the help of Monsignor Pierre Hevey and Alphonse Desjardins. The building was donated to the museum by Mr. & Mrs. Armand Lemire. To create the museum, the first two floors were converted into exhibit space about credit union history in the United States. The first floor pays tribute to the founding era of the credit union from 1908 to 1933. The second floor has historical artifacts beginning from 1934, featuring the Estes Park conference that created the Credit Union National Association, and the 1934 Federal Credit Union Act which enabled credit unions to be established in all states in the nation. The third floor contains an 85-person capacity meeting space with LCD projectors.

== See also ==
- National Register of Historic Places listings in Hillsborough County, New Hampshire
- Sainte Marie Roman Catholic Church Parish Historic District, and Ste. Marie Church (Manchester, New Hampshire), also located on Notre Dame Avenue in Manchester
- New Hampshire Historical Marker No. 208: St. Mary's Bank Credit Union / La Caisse Populaire Sainte-Marie
- History of credit unions
- Monsignor Pierre Hevey
- Edward Filene
