= Pierre Hevey =

Canadian-American Catholic priest and founder of credit unions (1831–1910)

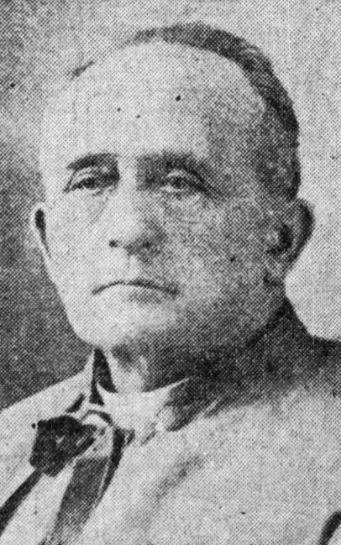
- Born: Pierre Hévey; October 21, 1831; Quebec, Canada
- Died: March 21, 1910 (aged 78); Manchester, New Hampshire, U.S.
- Occupation: Roman Catholic priest
- Known for: Establishment of first credit union in the United States

Pierre Hevey (October 21, 1831 – March 21, 1910) was a Canadian-born American priest, and second pastor of Ste. Marie Church in Manchester, New Hampshire, in the early 20th century. He played a key role in the establishment of the first credit union in the United States on November 24, 1908, to help his parishioners save money and access credit at a reasonable cost.

Hevey was born on October 21, 1831, in Quebec, Canada. He died on March 21, 1910, in the McGregorville neighborhood of Manchester.

== See also ==
- History of credit unions
- New Hampshire Historical Marker No. 208: St. Mary's Bank Credit Union / La Caisse Populaire Sainte-Marie

People

- Attorney Joseph Boivin
- Edward Filene
- Alphonse Desjardins

Places

- America's Credit Union Museum
- Ste. Marie Church (Manchester, New Hampshire)
- Sainte Marie Roman Catholic Church Parish Historic District
