= St. Mary's Bank =

First United States credit union

Coordinates: 42°59′35″N 71°28′25″W

- Formerly: La Caisse Populaire, Ste-Marie
- Company type: Credit union (Non-profit organization)
- Industry: Financial services
- Founded: 1908; 118 years ago
- Founder: Monsignor Pierre Hevey
- Headquarters: 200 McGregor Street, Manchester, New Hampshire, United States
- Number of locations: 13
- Key people: Ken Senus, President and CEO
- Products: Savings; checking; consumer loans; mortgages; credit cards; online banking; mobile banking; business banking
- Net income: $16.4 million
- Total assets: $1.53 billion
- Owner: Member-owned
- Members: 94,044 (2024)
- Number of employees: 282 (2024)
- Website: www.stmarysbank.com

St. Mary's Bank is an American credit union based in Manchester, New Hampshire. It was founded in 1908 and was the first credit union in the United States.

The credit union offers personal banking, business banking, savings, checking, investment, mortgages, home equity, auto loans, online banking, and debit and credit cards.

As of 2025, St. Mary's Bank has 13 branches, all in New Hampshire: five in Manchester, two in Nashua, and one each in Hudson, Londonderry, Milford, Portsmouth, North Hampton, and Concord.

== History ==
In 1908, Monseigneur Pierre Hevey, pastor of the parish at Ste. Marie Church in Manchester, began organizing a new financial institution with the goal to help the city's primarily Franco-American millworkers save and borrow money. He sought assistance from Alphonse Desjardins, who had organized several credit unions in Quebec, and from attorney Joseph Boivin, who volunteered his time and home as the first branch. On November 24, 1908, the business officially opened its doors in Manchester and became the first credit union in the nation. It received a charter from the New Hampshire General Court on April 9, 1909.

The institution was originally called St. Mary's Cooperative Credit Association. In 1925, it revised its name to La Caisse Populaire Ste.-Marie, or the Bank of the People, St. Mary's. French-speaking millworkers were the primary customers of St. Mary's, including children, who often had accounts at the credit union to deposit their wages from working in the mills.

By the mid-1950s, St. Mary's was serving several thousand members and had $6 million in assets. In 1970, St. Mary's Bank built and moved into its present main office at McGregor Street in Manchester.

The building where Joseph Boivin first managed the business of the credit union became America's Credit Union Museum in 2002 and is listed on the National Register of Historic Places. The building serves as a historical and educational site for the credit union movement. Boivin's office is recreated to demonstrate how he accepted deposits in a room in his home. An expansion, funded by $3.3 million in donations from credit unions around the United States, was announced in 2018. The expansion hosts the Ensweiler Research Library and CUNA Research Center.

== Assets ==
2024 assets	2019 assets	2017 assets	2015 assets	2014 assets	2008 assets
$1.53 billion	$1.045 billion	$1.010 billion	$890 million	$814 million	$713 million

== Legacy ==
St. Mary's Bank became overlooked in the history of credit unions in the United States, with Edward Filene, who championed the Massachusetts Credit Union Act of 1909 and the establishment of several credit unions, receiving recognition as the "father of the credit union." Indeed, Filene coined the term "credit union" to draw connections to the labor movement and with credit rather than lending. This led to a 1976 lawsuit, La Caisse Populaire Ste-Marie (St. Mary's Bank) v. United States, in which St. Mary's Bank had to prove that it was a credit union, as it does not use the term "credit union" in its name, and is governed slightly different from most of the credit unions that came after it.

Nonetheless, St. Mary's Bank likely inspired the passage of the Massachusetts Credit Union Act of 1909. Within New Hampshire, the credit union significantly changed the economic prospects of Franco-American immigrants, who previously struggled to access the banking system. St. Mary's was more willing to take smaller deposits from working immigrants, as well as to lend to immigrants. Additionally, St. Mary's offered services in French, including the local New England French spoken on Manchester's West Side. Today, St. Mary's offers services in other languages spoken by New Hampshire's immigrant population.

== See also ==
- History of credit unions
