= Dora Maxwell =

Dora Maxwell

Dora Maxwell (1897 – June 29, 1985) was an early credit union pioneer in New York state. Despite having to deal with intimidating bankers, she secured charters for hundreds of credit unions throughout the United States. In 1932 Maxwell replaced Basil B Mallicoat as the head of the CUNEB branch and new headquarters called "Eastern State Offices" located on Forty-Second Street in New York, New York. She was a delegate to the 1934 Estes Park conference which established the Credit Union National Association (CUNA) and worked as an organizer for the Credit Union National Extension Bureau, the movement's trade organization. In 1937, she worked alongside Thomas Doig to represent and promote CUNA Mutual Insurance, collect national dues, and generally represent CUNA in the field.

After CUNA's national headquarters was moved to Madison, Wisconsin, Maxwell was placed in charge of the Boston office. This allowed her to build up the CUNA-affiliated Massachusetts League and expand the leagues in New York and New Jersey. In 1940, she headed the CUNA Organization Service which was charged with finding "leads" on groups who might be interested in becoming credit unions. She would then connect these groups with their corresponding state credit union leagues.

In 1946, she joined the Madison, Wisconsin, office as director of the Organization & Education Department. Later in 1954, she led a nationwide radio and magazine advertisement campaign for CUNA Mutual.

She is the namesake of the Dora Maxwell Social Responsibility Award of CUNA, an award that recognizes credit unions for social responsibility projects within their communities.
