= Ste. Marie Church (Manchester, New Hampshire) =

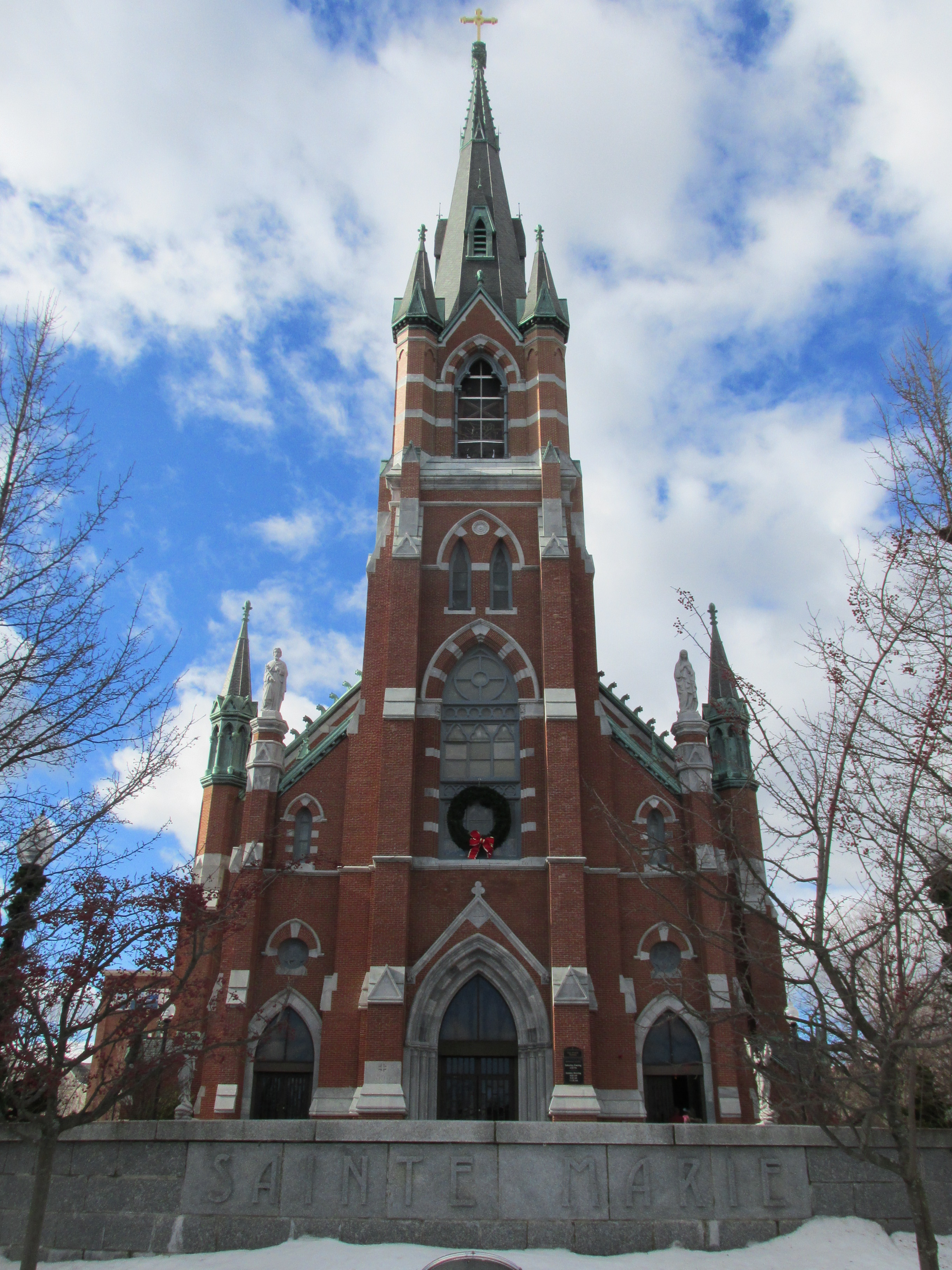
- Ste. Marie Church
- Ste. Marie Church
- 42°59′33″N 71°28′35″W
- Location: 378 Notre Dame Avenue, Manchester, New Hampshire
- Country: United States
- Denomination: Roman Catholic
- Website: www.enterthenarrowgate.org

History
- Founded: 1880

Administration
- Province: Ecclesiastical Province of Boston
- Diocese: Diocese of Manchester
- Deanery: Amoskeag

Clergy
- Bishop: Most Rev. Peter A. Libasci
- Dean: Very Rev. Christopher M. Martel
- Pastor: Rev. Maurice R. Larochelle Deacon Francis X. Burke

Ste. Marie Church is a Roman Catholic church on the West Side of Manchester, New Hampshire, in the United States. The church was founded to serve the needs of French-Canadian Catholic immigrants to New Hampshire. The Gothic Revival church building is a prominent feature on the Manchester skyline, and dominates the West Side skyline. The building is perched atop the plateau that makes up Rimmon Heights, and forms one of the focal points of the Notre Dame neighborhood, along with Lafayette Park across the street.

In 1908, while pastor of Ste. Marie, Monsignor Pierre Hevey organized the founding of St. Mary's Bank, which is still based at the foot of the hill beneath the church. Today, Ste. Marie is known, among other things, for its popular Midnight Mass each Christmas Eve, Easter Vigil, and Pentecost Vigil. In September 2019, the church, and the other buildings on campus were added to the National Register of Historic Places as part of the Sainte Marie Roman Catholic Church Parish Historic District.

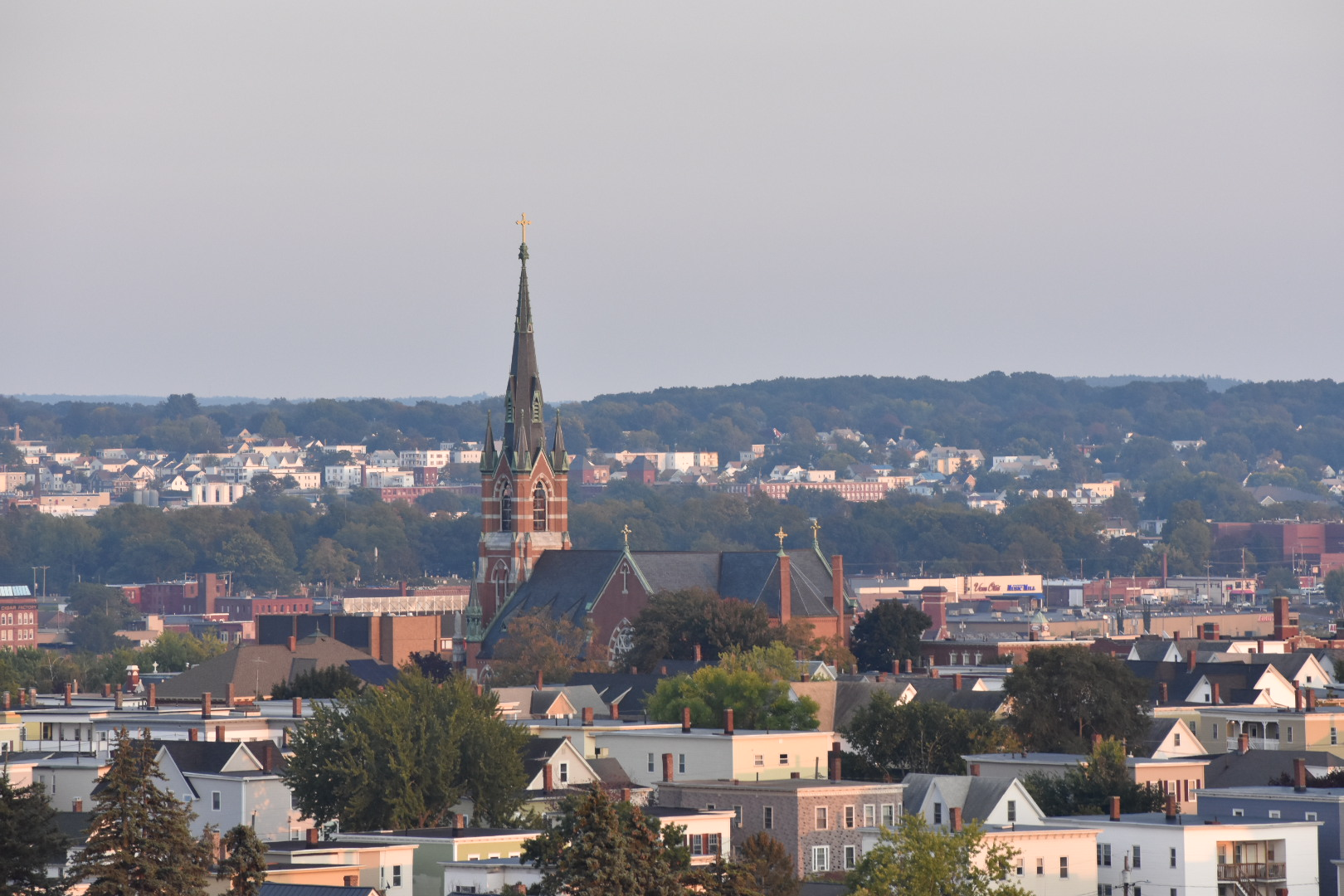
Ste. Marie Church as seen from Rock Rimmon
