= List of Florida companies =

List of Florida companies includes notable companies that are, or once were, headquartered in Florida.

== Companies based in Florida ==
=== # ===
- 1789 Capital

=== A ===
- A21, Inc.
- Abeka
- Achieva Credit Union
- Adecco Group North America
- ADT Inc.
- AdventHealth
- Adventure Landing
- Aero Adventure Aviation
- AerSale
- Air Sunshine
- AirScan
- Alienware
- American Top Team
- Amerijet International
- Arthur Rutenberg Homes
- Associated Grocers of Florida
- Association of Tennis Professionals
- AutoNation

=== B ===
- B/E Aerospace
- Baptist Health
- Bealls
- Beasley Broadcast Group
- Bijoux Terner
- Bloomin' Brands
- Blue Cross and Blue Shield of Florida
- Bombardier Capital
- Bonefish Grill
- Brightline
- Burger King

=== C ===
- Carnival Corporation
- Carrier Global Corporation
- Checkers and Rally's
- Cheeburger Cheeburger
- Chewy, Inc.
- Chico's
- Citadel LLC
- Citizens First Bank
- Citrix Systems
- Cortera
- Costa Del Mar
- CSX Corporation

=== D ===
- Darden Restaurants
- Demaco
- DHL Americas
- Discotek Media
- Discount Home Shoppers' Club
- Disney Cruise Line
- Disney World Resort
- DiSTI

=== E ===
- EMR Telemetry
- Equitrac
- EverBank
- Express One International

=== F ===
- Fidelity National Financial
- Firehouse Subs
- First Watch
- FIS
- Fleming's Prime Steakhouse & Wine Bar
- Florida Credit Union
- Florida East Coast Railway
- Florida Power & Light
- Fresh Del Monte Produce

=== G ===
- GEO Group
- GTE Financial
- Gulf Power Company

=== H ===
- Hard Rock Cafe
- Haskell
- HEICO
- Hertz
- Home Shopping Network

=== I ===
- IBC Airways
- IBM Southeast Employees' Credit Union
- Interline Brands
- Ion Media
- Island Company

=== J ===
- Jabil
- Jacksonville Jaguars
- Jarden
- JEA
- JetSmarter

=== K ===
- Kre8tiveworkz

=== L ===
- Landstar System
- Larry's Giant Subs
- Lennar

=== M ===
- Magic Leap
- Marriott Vacations Worldwide Corporation
- The Melting Pot
- MidFlorida Credit Union

=== N ===
- National Beverage
- Navarro Discount Pharmacies
- Nemours Foundation
- NextEra Energy
- Norwegian Cruise Line

=== O ===
- Odyssey Marine Exploration
- Office Depot
- Outback Steakhouse

=== P ===
- Palantir
- Parkjockey
- People's Trust Insurance Company
- PetMed Express
- PGA Tour
- Piper Aircraft
- Pollo Tropical
- Popeyes
- Primo Water
- Publix

=== R ===
- Randall Made Knives
- Raymond James Financial
- Rayonier
- Rayonier Advanced Materials
- Reedy Creek Energy Services
- Regency Centers
- Regent Seven Seas Cruises
- Ring Power
- Roper Technologies
- Royal Caribbean International
- Ryder

=== S ===
- SBA Communications
- St. Joe Company
- St. Vincent's Medical Center Riverside
- ScribeAmerica
- Seald Sweet International
- SeaWorld Parks and Entertainment
- Sedano's
- ShipMonk
- Signature Aviation
- Skymax
- Skyway Enterprises
- Songbird Airways
- Space Coast Credit Union
- SpaceX launch facilities
- Spirit Airlines
- Stein Mart
- Suncoast Credit Union
- Swisher International Group

=== T ===
- Tech Data
- TECO Energy
- Telemundo
- Tournament Players Club
- Trailer Bridge
- Trans-Florida Airlines
- Triton Submarines
- Tropical Financial Credit Union
- Tupperware Brands

=== U ===
- UF Health Jacksonville
- U.S. Century Bank
- United Parks & Resorts
- Universal Orlando Resort

=== V ===
- V-me
- Valpak
- Venus Fashion
- Vistikon
- VyStar Financial Group

=== W ===
- Watsco
- WellCare
- Westgate Resorts
- Winn-Dixie
- World Atlantic Airlines
- World Fuel Services
- World Golf Village

== Companies formerly based in Florida ==
=== A ===
- AirTran Airways
- American Momentum Bank
- Andrx Corporation
- Armor Holdings
- Arrow Air
- Arthur Treacher's
- Atlantic Coast Financial

=== B ===
- BankAtlantic
- Barnett Bank

=== C ===
- Chalk's International Airlines
- Charter Company
- Chris-Craft Industries
- Circle K
- Claire's
- Cuppy's Coffee
- Custom Air Transport

=== E ===
- Express.Net Airlines

=== F ===
- Florida Rock Industries
- Florida Tile
- Florida West International Airways

=== G ===
- Guide
- Gulfstream International Airlines

=== H ===
- Harris Corporation
- Hawaiian Tropic
- Health Management Associates
- Hooters

=== J ===
- Jim Walter Homes

=== L ===
- Lynx Air International

=== M ===
- Muvico Theaters

=== P ===
- Pearl Art and Craft Supply
- PSS World Medical

=== R ===
- Rail Management Corporation
- RailAmerica
- Republic Services

=== S ===
- SaveRite
- SkyValue
- Spherion
- Stockton, Whatley, Davin & Co.

=== T ===
- ThriftyComputer
- Tropicana Products

=== W ===
- Walter Industries
- Windjammer Barefoot Cruises

== See also ==
- List of companies based in Miami
- List of companies based in the Jacksonville area
- List of companies of the United States by state
- List of manufacturing companies based in Florida
