= TFCU =

TFCU may refer to:

- Teachers Federal Credit Union
- Tinker Federal Credit Union, a credit union in Oklahoma
- Tower Federal Credit Union, a credit union in Maryland
- Transportation Federal Credit Union
- Tropical Financial Credit Union, a credit union in Florida
- Truliant Federal Credit Union, a credit union in North Carolina
- Tucson Federal Credit Union
- Tyco Federal Credit Union, a credit union serving Tyco, Tyco Electronics and Covidien
