= VMT =

VMT may refer to:

- Virtual maintenance training, type of training method that includes computer-based interactive 3D simulations of virtual equipment
- Vehicle miles of travel, a measurement of the number of miles traveled within a specified region over a given time period
- Video mixtape, a stock footage movie consisting of clips from movies, television, or home videos.
- Virginia Museum of Transportation
- Virtual method table, a mechanism used in programming language to support dynamic dispatch

== See also ==
- Vehicle miles traveled tax
- Virgin Media Television (disambiguation)
