= LXF =

LXF may refer to:

- Linux Format, the UK's first Linux-specific magazine
- .lxf, the filename extension for Lego Digital Designer
- Fairchild LXF, a variant of the Fairchild 91 Baby Clipper
- Lynx Air International, the ICAO code LXF
