= Pinellas Education Foundation =

Nonprofit organization in Pinellas County, Florida

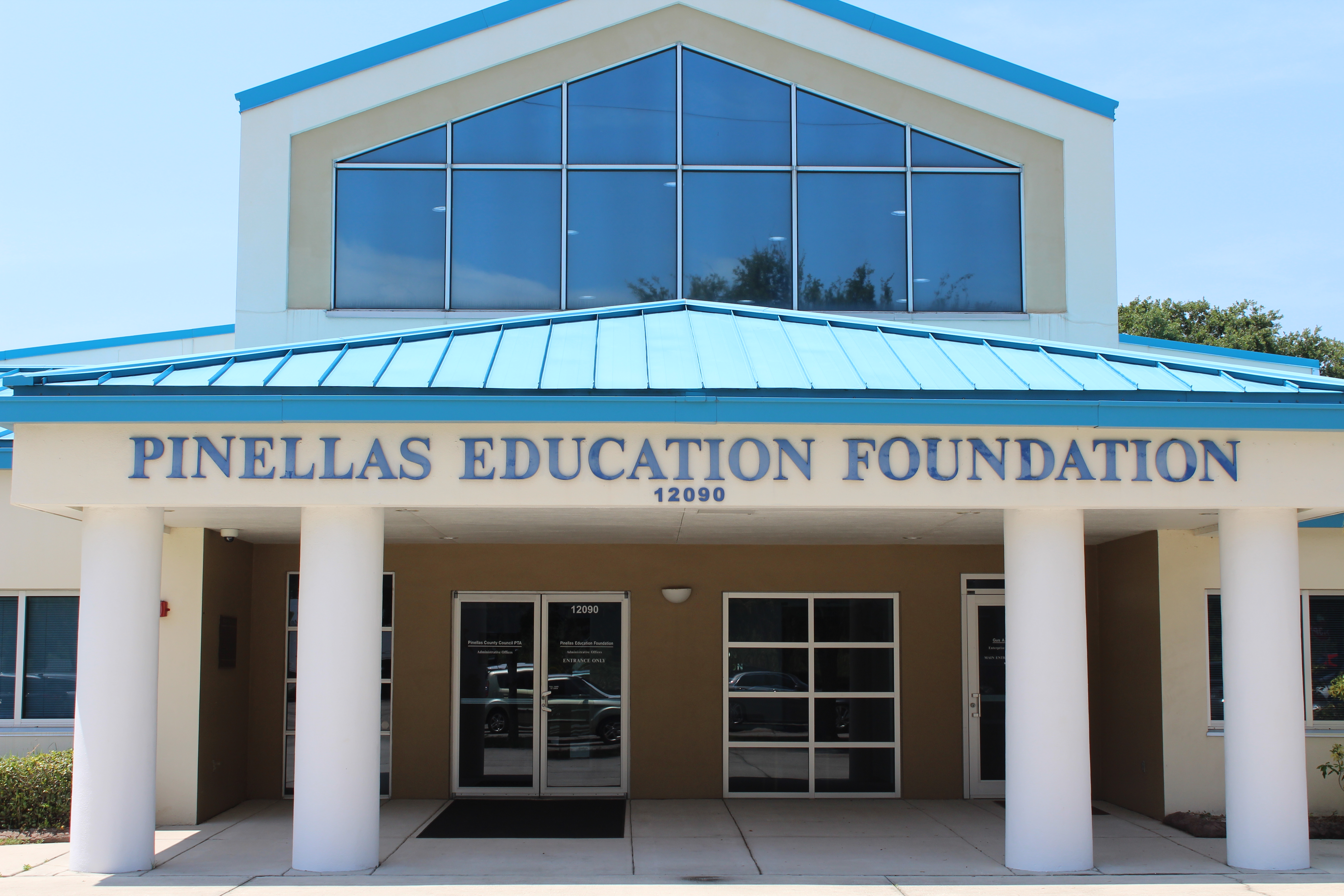
- Formation: 1986; 40 years ago
- Founders: Gus Stavros
- Type: Nonprofit organization (IRS exemption status): 501(c)(3)
- Purpose: Education
- Headquarters: Largo, Florida, United States
- Region served: Pinellas County, Florida
- Method: Scholarships, mentoring, and volunteering
- Key people: Gus Stavros, founding chairman Kim Jowell, CEO; Robert Byelick, chairman
- Website: https://pinellaseducation.org/
- Formerly called: Pinellas County Education Foundation

The Pinellas Education Foundation is a nonprofit organization founded in 1986. Based in Largo in Pinellas County, Florida, the foundation's primary aims are to improve educational opportunities in Pinellas County schools and improve the quality of public education. The foundation has raised over $140 million to support students and teachers in Pinellas County. The Pinellas Education Foundation ranked first in an annual nationwide study and ranking of K-12 Education Foundations for three consecutive years, in 2014, 2015, and 2016.

== History ==
The Pinellas Education Foundation was founded in 1986, with Gus Stavros serving as a founding chairman. The foundation is a coalition of business and community leaders, and is partnered with or sponsored by several businesses and organizations, including the Stavros Institute. Terry Boehm served as the foundation's president from 2001 to 2017, before being succeeded by Stacy Baier (née Carlson) in March 2017. In an annual nationwide study and ranking of K-12 Education Foundations, the Pinellas Education Foundation has been ranked first for three consecutive years, in 2014, 2015, and 2016. In August 2018, the foundation's logo was changed from a previous blue-and-white design, which featured an image of a graduation cap, to a logo with a sunburst graphic and a warmer color palette.

In July 2018, Doug Bishop began serving a two-year term as the Chairman of the Pinellas Education Foundation. He replaced Gary Regoli, president of Achieva Credit Union. In the following months, the Richard O. Jacobson Foundation donated $5 million to the Pinellas Education Foundation, which is the largest donation ever received by the nonprofit. It was publicly given to the Foundation on November 30, 2018, at a ribbon-cutting ceremony commemorating the renaming of Pinellas Technical High School to the Richard O. Jacobson Technical High School. The Seminole high school originally opened in 1961 as the Largo-Seminole Agriculture Center, before being renamed as the Career Academies of Seminole and later Pinellas Technical High School. The funds will contribute to the construction of a veterinary science building at the high school, while also helping "high-achieving minority and low-income students" to go on to higher education through a districtwide initiative known as Elevating Excellence. At the ribbon-cutting ceremony, Bishop stated that the Richard O. Jacobson Foundation has donated $7.5 million to the Pinellas Education Foundation in total.

In March 2020, Pinellas Education Foundation was given $150,000 by Resiliency Fund for Pinellas Education Foundation's Digital Equity project, which aims to provide stable and high-speed internet for students.

== Programs and partnerships ==
=== Enterprise Village and Finance Park ===
Partnered with the Stavros Institute, the Pinellas Education Foundation helps run Enterprise Village and Finance Park, hands-on educational programs on economics and business. Enterprise Village, is designed for fifth-grade students. After a unit of in-classroom learning, fifth-grade students at participating schools visit Enterprise Village, an indoor set of various artificial stores, where they learn to use checks and debit cards, and apply for and work in mock-up jobs at partnered companies. Finance Park is the eighth-grade equivalent of Enterprise Village, with a focus on understanding insurance, along with using mathematics and decision-making skills to effectively budget healthcare, utilities, and other expenses.

=== Next Generation programs ===
The foundation's Next Generation Entrepreneurs program, started in 2012, awards grants to students with innovative business ideas. The Next Generation Tech program, started in 2016, provides high school students with real-world settings for developing software, while working with mentors and attending monthly workshops. The program emphasizes the software development framework and the varied types of skills and career opportunities required to develop technology solutions. The Tampa Bay Technology Forum named the Next Generation Tech program the Student Program of the Year for 2016. On April 26, 2017, the Pinellas Education Foundation awarded a total of $30,000 to the 1st, 2nd, and 3rd-place winners of the 2016–17 Next Generation Competition, with first place for each program receiving $10,000, and the second and third places receiving $3,500 and $1,500, respectively.

=== Stuff the Bus ===
In partnership with Fox 13 News and the Pinellas County Council PTA, the Pinellas Education Foundation sponsors and helps organize "Stuff the Bus" donation drives, in which businesses and members of the local community can donate school supplies before an upcoming school year.

=== Take Stock in Children ===
Through donations, the foundation has awarded scholarships to over 1,200 low-income students in Florida through the Pinellas Take Stock in Children Scholarship program, in partnership with the statewide Take Stock in Children program. The statewide program is a fellow nonprofit organization established in 1995. Over 24,000 children have been enrolled in the overall program.

=== Walker's Rising Stars ===
Established in 2003, the Walker's Rising Stars scholarship competition recognizes public high school junior and senior students with proficiency as visual or performing artists. The young artists, in the fields of culinary arts, dance, instrumental, theatre, visual arts, and vocals, compete for up to $5,000 worth of scholarships distributed by the Pinellas Education Foundation, which are awarded to 1st, 2nd, 3rd, and 4th-place finalists.
