= A21 =

A21, A-21 or A.21 may refer to:

- A road in the List of A21 roads
- a21, Inc., an American stock-photography company
- The A21 Campaign, a non-profit, non-governmental organization that combats human trafficking, slave and bonded labor, involuntary domestic servitude, and child soldiery
- Aero A.21, a 1920s-era Czechoslovak military aeroplane
- Arrows A21, a Formula One car
- British NVC community A21 (Ranunculus baudotii community), a plant community
- Focke-Wulf A 21, a photographic survey variant of the 1927 German Focke-Wulf A 17
- Stearman XA-21, a twin-engine American attack bomber
- A21 (chess opening), a code for the English Opening in chess
- Astraea A21, a planned British thermonuclear warhead
