= ITHINK Financial Amphitheatre =

Music venue in West Palm Beach, Florida, US

Coordinates: 26.685387°N 80.186269°W

iTHINK Financial Amphitheatre
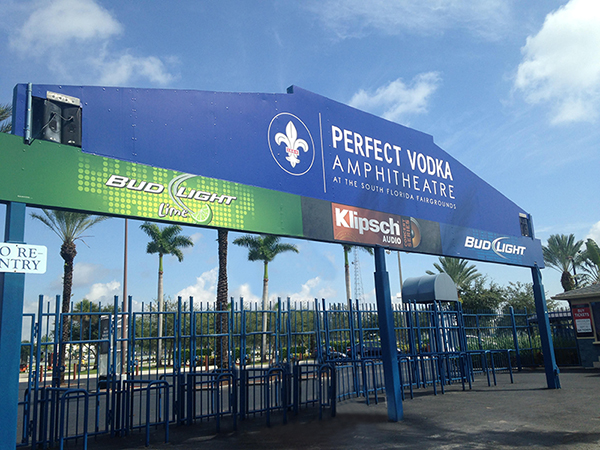
- Entrance to the venue (c.2015)
- Interactive map of iTHINK Financial Amphitheatre
- Full name: iTHINK Financial Amphitheatre at the South Florida Fairgrounds
- Former names: Coral Sky Amphitheatre (1996–2000; 2002–03; 2015, 2017–2020); Mars Music Amphitheatre (2000–02); Sound Advice Amphitheatre (2003–08); Cruzan Amphitheatre (2008–15); Perfect Vodka Amphitheatre (2015–17)
- Address: 601-7 Sansburys Way; West Palm Beach, FL 33411-3660
- Location: South Florida Fairgrounds
- Owner: South Florida Fair & Palm Beach County Expositions, Inc.
- Operator: Live Nation
- Capacity: 20,000

Construction
- Opened: April 26, 1996
- Cost: $10 million ($21.1 million in 2025 dollars)

The iTHINK Financial Amphitheatre is a 20,000-seat open-air (Approx. 8,000 seats under cover and approx. 12,000 lawn seats) music venue in West Palm Beach, Florida. The facility, owned by the South Florida Fairgrounds, is a modern amphitheatre used primarily for concerts and other performances. The loading dock and backstage area is sometimes used for concerts that are general admission standing room only (mostly heavy metal concerts), while the amphitheatre stage is used as the backstage area in these situations.

== History ==
The venue opened on April 26, 1996. Since opening, the venue has gone through numerous name changes; it is the amphitheatre that has had the most name changes in the United States. It was initially named Coral Sky Amphitheatre because the seats face into the west, often in view of a colorful sunset. The venue was renamed to Mars Music Amphitheatre on January 6, 2000, named after the music store chain Mars Music. However, Mars Music filed for Chapter 11 bankruptcy in 2002, and in August 2002 the venue reverted to its previous name. It then changed again when Sound Advice became the new sponsor, and was renamed Sound Advice Amphitheatre on June 1, 2003. In early 2008, the venue was renamed again following a new sponsorship agreement with Cruzan Rum, becoming the Cruzan Amphitheatre on February 1, 2008. On February 11, 2015, the venue reverted to its original name, the Coral Sky Amphitheatre, while owners looked for a new sponsor. In June, the venue succeeded in securing a new sponsorship with Perfect Vodka, and it was renamed to the Perfect Vodka Amphitheatre at the South Florida Fairgrounds. Its name reverted again to Coral Sky Amphiteatre on August 4, 2017. On January 16, 2020, the name was changed to iTHINK Financial Amphitheatre, after a sponsorship deal with iTHINK Financial Credit Union.

== Performances ==
Because of the Palm Beaches' climate, many major concert tours that would visit arenas in other cities usually stop at iTHINK Financial Amphitheatre, enabling it to be used as a year-round concert venue.

Other events include The Buzz Bake Sale, Curiosa, Lilith Fair, The Gigantour, Projekt Revolution, Christ Fellowship's Easter services, Ozzfest, Crüe Fest, Crüe Fest 2, The Mayhem Festival and The Vans Warped Tour, among others.

On November 2, 1996, Phish played the amphitheatre as part of their 1996 fall tour. They were joined by Karl Perazzo (of Santana fame) on percussion for the entire show. Portions of this performance were released to the syndicated radio program The Album Network. This show was released as the Coral Sky DVD in 2010 and is available as a download from LivePhish.

On June 15, 1998, the Spice Girls kicked off the US leg of the Spiceworld Tour; two weeks prior, Geri Halliwell had left the group.

Britney Spears performed to a sold out crowd on her Oops!... I Did It Again World Tour on September 10th, 2000.

On September 4, 2003 Tori Amos played her last concert of her Scarlet's Walk tour here. It was filmed and released on DVD one year later, in May 2004, called Welcome to Sunny Florida.

The venue was scheduled to host the final Ozzfest tour date of 2004, on September 4, but the show was cancelled due to Hurricane Frances.

On June 16, 2015 Lana Del Rey played her last concert of The Endless Summer Tour performing songs like Honeymoon and Florida Kilos for the first time.

May 20, 2017 the band Muse played there along with 30 Seconds to Mars and Pvris.

May 27, 2017 the band Train played at the amphitheater for their "Play that song" world tour, along with Natasha Bedingfield and O.A.R.

Since 1996 Dave Matthews Band has performed at the amphitheater more than 30 times, playing two-night stands at the venue nearly each year, beginning in 2002.

On June 11, 2026 American rock band Evanescence Kicked off their tour in support of their latest album Sanctuary released earlier on June 5th.

== See also ==
- List of contemporary amphitheatres
- Live Nation
