= Gus Stavros =

American entrepreneur (1925–2022)

- Born: February 1, 1925; New Jersey, U.S.
- Died: October 18, 2022 (aged 97)
- Education: Columbia University
- Spouse: Frances Shaw (m. 1948; died 2017)
- Children: 3
- Parent: Anthony Stavros

Gus A. Stavros (February 1, 1925 – October 18, 2022) was an American businessman and philanthropist. He founded the company Better Business Forms in the 1960s and later sold it. He founded the Stavros Institute and was a founding chairman of the Pinellas Education Foundation to improve the quality of local public education. He also served on the board of trustees of the University of South Florida and the governing board of USF St. Petersburg. He was also a part-owner of the Tampa Bay Rays baseball team.

== Early life ==
Stavros was born in New Jersey on February 1, 1925. His father, Anthony, was originally from Crete and immigrated to the United States in 1912, eventually owning his own diners; his mother, Elizabeth Kourasmenos, was also a Greek émigré who oversaw the cash register at her husband's business. Raised in Elizabeth, New Jersey, Stavros worked at his father's Twin Diner in his youth. After graduating near the top of his class at Thomas Jefferson High School in 1942, he was awarded a scholarship to study at Columbia University, which he attended for one year before joining the United States Army, which assigned him for one year as part of the Army Specialized Training Program to a basic engineering program at the University of Florida. He subsequently served on the Western Front, receiving a Purple Heart and a Bronze Star Medal after being wounded on January 19, 1945. This resulted in him being unable to use his left hand.

Upon his return from military service, Stavros resumed his studies at Columbia and graduated with a degree in liberal arts in 1948. He also appeared as a background extra in the 1947 film The Farmer's Daughter.

== Career ==
Stavros founded the company Better Business Forms in Pinellas Park during the 1960s. It eventually expanded from 3 to 550 employees, and he later sold it in 1984 for $12.5 million.

Stavros was also the founder of the Stavros Institute in Largo and was a founding chairman of the Pinellas Education Foundation, two organizations whose aims are to improve the quality of public education in Pinellas County, Florida. The organizations, which operate the business education programs Enterprise Village and Finance Park, have raised over $140 million to support students and teachers in Pinellas County.

Stavros was the chairman of the University of South Florida (USF) Foundation and served on the school's board of trustees until January 2003, when he was appointed to the governing board of USF St. Petersburg. During his tenure, Stavros called for security to be upgraded across public campuses in Florida, in response to shootings at Northern Illinois University and Virginia Tech. He was also critical of the inability of the state's university system – which had the worst student-to-faculty ratio in the country at the time – to entice elite faculty due to a lack of funding, stating that "we have to have quality faculty, professors, we have to raise tuition".

Stavros was also a fan of baseball, and owned 1% of the Tampa Bay Rays baseball team. His term on the Florida Board of Governors expired in January 2013, around the time when Stavros made the decision to spend more time with his wife than on community affairs.

== Personal life ==
Gus A. Stavros Center for the Advancement of Free Enterprise and Economic Education at Florida State University

Stavros married Frances Shaw in 1948. They met at a bowling alley when he was a high school senior, and remained married for almost 69 years until her death in 2017. Together, they had three children: Ellen, Paul and Mark. They relocated to Pinellas County, Florida, in 1958.

Stavros died on October 18, 2022, at the age of 97.
