= Amigos For Kids =

- Formation: 1991
- Founder: Jorge A. Plasencia
- Founded at: Miami, Florida
- Type: Non-profit
- Services: Anti-child abuse
- Key people: Rosa Maria Plasencia, CEO
- Website: amigosforkids.org

Amigos Together For Kids (DBA: Amigos For Kids) is a 501(c)(3) non-profit corporation founded in 1991 dedicated to preventing child abuse and neglect by valuing children, strengthening families and educating communities. The group was founded by Jorge A. Plasencia. Amigos For Kids has created a model after-school program at Jose Marti Park in Miami for over 100 underprivileged children in a public and private partnership with the City of Miami. The organization creates awareness for its cause through a variety of public service campaigns and high-profile fundraising events including the successful Celebrity Domino Night. It also runs an annual toy drive to collect Christmas gifts for disadvantaged children.

Amigos For Kids has trademarked the term "There's No Excuse for Child Abuse!" in English, Spanish and Creole. The organization, an affiliate of the National Council of La Raza (NCLR), is governed by a volunteer board of directors whose current chair is Nicole Valls. Rosa Maria Plasencia is the current President and CEO.

Throughout its over 25-year history, Amigos has created numerous programs for these children in the inner-city across South Florida.

In 2017, Amigos collaborated with Republica on Broken Crayons. The groundbreaking art exhibit transformed children’s drawings into an immersive experience, showing patrons the raw reality of child abuse. The PSA campaign demonstrated how abused children’s cries for help can easily be overlooked.

In 2010, Amigos took its awareness message nationally, airing public-service announcements targeting US Hispanics on the prevention of child abuse and neglect. As of 2010, Amigos For Kids had received four stars for three consecutive years from charitynavigator.com, an honor that only 12% of nonprofits nationally have garnered. Amigos For Kids also hosts workshops and parenting programs across the Miami-area.

Notable artists and people have supported or appeared at Amigos For Kids such as Ingrid Hoffmann, Ileana Ros-Lehtinen, Juan Soler, Pitbull, Paquito D'Rivera, Juan Pablo Torres, Dave Valentin, Giovanni Hidalgo, Hilton Ruiz, Tito Puente Marc Anthony. and Gloria Estefan. In August 2013, U. S. Representative Debbie Wasserman Schultz met with Miami organization leaders including Amigo For Kids, to discuss "current and future sequestration of Hispanic and Latino families in South Florida". In June 2013, In November 2013, Amigos For Kids collaborated with Miami Heat player Ray Allen to distribute 250 Thanksgiving meals. In March 2015, actor Gabriel Coronel raided $60,000 for Amigos For Kids after participating in a Top Chef competition. In April 2015, Amigos For Kids was one of several organizations to receive over $1 million in donations from Verizon. In June 2015, the group hosted its annual Celebrity Domino Night at Jungle Island which was sponsored by Bacardi and Lincoln Motor Company and featured celebrities including Elizabeth Gutiérrez, Khotan Fernández, María Elena Salinas, Sonya Smith and Pamela Silva Conde.

== Financing ==
In 2010, Amigos For Kids raised $1,144,922. Program expenses for the year were $1,218,018 with 85% of the expenses going directly towards meeting the needs of the children which the organization serves. ~7% of the expenses were administrative expenses while 8% went towards fundraising. The organization ended the year with $205,000 in assets.
