= República, LLC =

Republica Havas
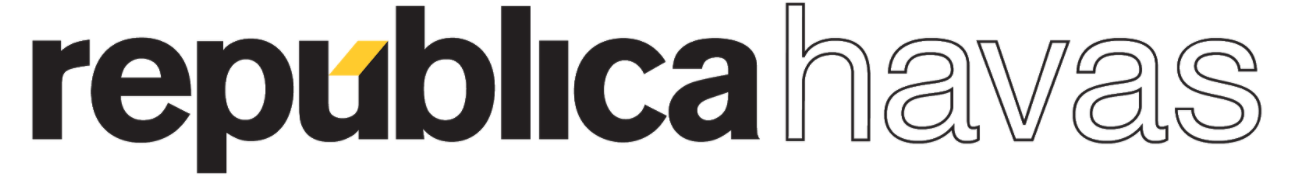
- Industry: Advertising, marketing & communications
- Founded: November 13, 2006
- Founders: Jorge A. Plasencia (Chairman & CEO); Luis Casamayor (President & CCO)
- Headquarters: Miami, Florida, United States
- Services: Advertising, brand strategy, media planning & buying, public relations, social media, market research, events & experiential, production, management consulting, community engagement

Republica Havas is a creative, media, and communications agency based in Miami, Florida.

== History ==
Republica Havas was founded on November 13, 2006, by Jorge Plasencia and Luis Casamayor as an agency focused on helping brands reach consumers across languages, traditions, and cultures.

Republica Havas was ranked for five consecutive years on Inc. Magazine's Inc. 5000 annual list of America's fastest growing private companies, servicing clients in the U.S. and around the world. In January 2010, Republica relocated to its own facility, The Republica Building, on Miami's Coral Way.

In September 2018, Republica announced an investment from Havas Group, a division of Vivendi, the global conglomerate that includes Universal Music Group, Canal+, Gameloft, Editis, and Dailymotion, among others. As part of the new partnership with Havas, Republica was renamed Republica Havas and according to Advertising Age, as part of the deal, the agency became Havas North America's lead multicultural agency.

== Notable clients ==
Over the years, the agency has created campaigns for clients including Toyota, Walmart, Google, Baptist Health, NBCUniversal, Nielsen Holdings, Royal Caribbean, Sedano's Supermarkets, Adrienne Arsht, Fairchild Tropical Botanic Garden, Air Wick, National Pork Board, and Biogen.

Republica Havas has also created public service campaigns, including Broken Crayons, and Stop the Cycle for child abuse prevention; nonprofit Amigos For Kids; the Es el Momento for the Gates Foundation and Univision; Stand Stronger for Civic Nation and The White House; El Poder en Ti for NBCUniversal Telemundo; and the Earth Unplugged album for Fairchild Tropical Botanic Garden.
