= Stavros Institute =

Educational organization in Pinellas County, Florida

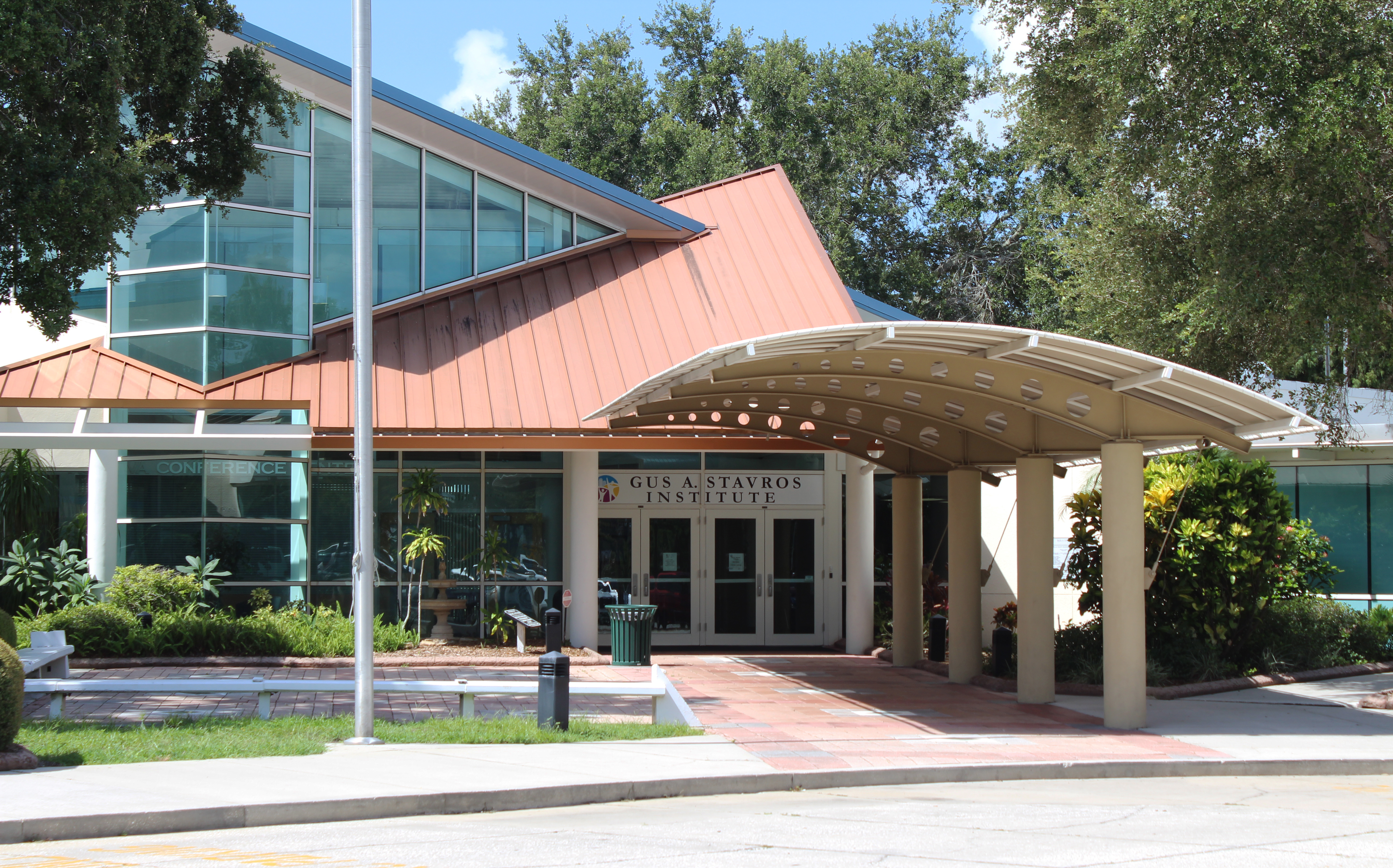
- Formation: 1989; 37 years ago
- Purpose: Education
- Headquarters: Largo, Florida, United States
- Region served: Pinellas County, Florida
- Key people: Gus Stavros, co-founder Patricia Jeremiah-Pittman, director
- Website: stavrosinstitute.org

The Gus A. Stavros Institute is an organization founded in 1989 and named after Gus Stavros. Located in Largo in Pinellas County, Florida, the institute is partnered with the Pinellas Education Foundation to run Enterprise Village and Finance Park, two economic educational programs.

== Programs ==
=== Enterprise Village ===
Enterprise Village was first proposed by former associate Superintendent of Education Dr. Howard Hinesley after visiting Exchange City, an economic educational facility in the form of a simulated town in Kansas City. It was determined that state money could not be used to support a similar venture in Pinellas County, Florida, so the funds for Enterprise Village were raised by a coalition of local business leaders led by Gus A. Stavros.

Established in 1989, Enterprise Village is designed for fifth-grade students. After six weeks of in-classroom learning, fifth-grade students at participating Pinellas County schools visit Enterprise Village, an indoor facility of various artificial stores, where they learn to write checks, use debit cards, and apply for and work at mock-up versions of partnered companies like CVS Pharmacy, Home Shopping Network, McDonald's, the Tampa Bay Times, and Verizon. During their breaks, the students can become consumers, being able to walk around the other stores and buy items with the artificial money they received from working at their jobs. In the early 2000s, students could work at mock-ups of a Blockbuster Video and an Eckerd Drug Store, but those now-defunct sponsors have since been replaced.

In 2002, baseball outfielder Jason Tyner was optioned from the Tampa Bay Devil Rays to a Triple-A team, resulting in the cancellation of a promotional giveaway involving 10,000 bobbleheads of Tyner. After sitting in storage for some time, many of the bobbleheads were eventually donated to Enterprise Village.

=== Finance Park ===
Finance Park is the eighth-grade equivalent of Enterprise Village, serving around 10,000 local students annually. Modeled after the success of Enterprise Village, Finance Park has a focus on mathematics and decision-making skills, with the aim of teaching students how to manage a household budget, including insurance, transportation, healthcare, entertainment, utilities, and other expenses. Students participating at Finance Park are challenged to pay all of their bills and balance their checkbooks by the end of their visit. In October 2018, a facility representing the YMCA was opened in Finance Park. David Jezek, president and CEO of the YMCA of Greater St. Petersburg, stated that "We are thrilled to partner in this manner, enhancing our impact on middle school students through financial literacy and health".

== Image gallery ==
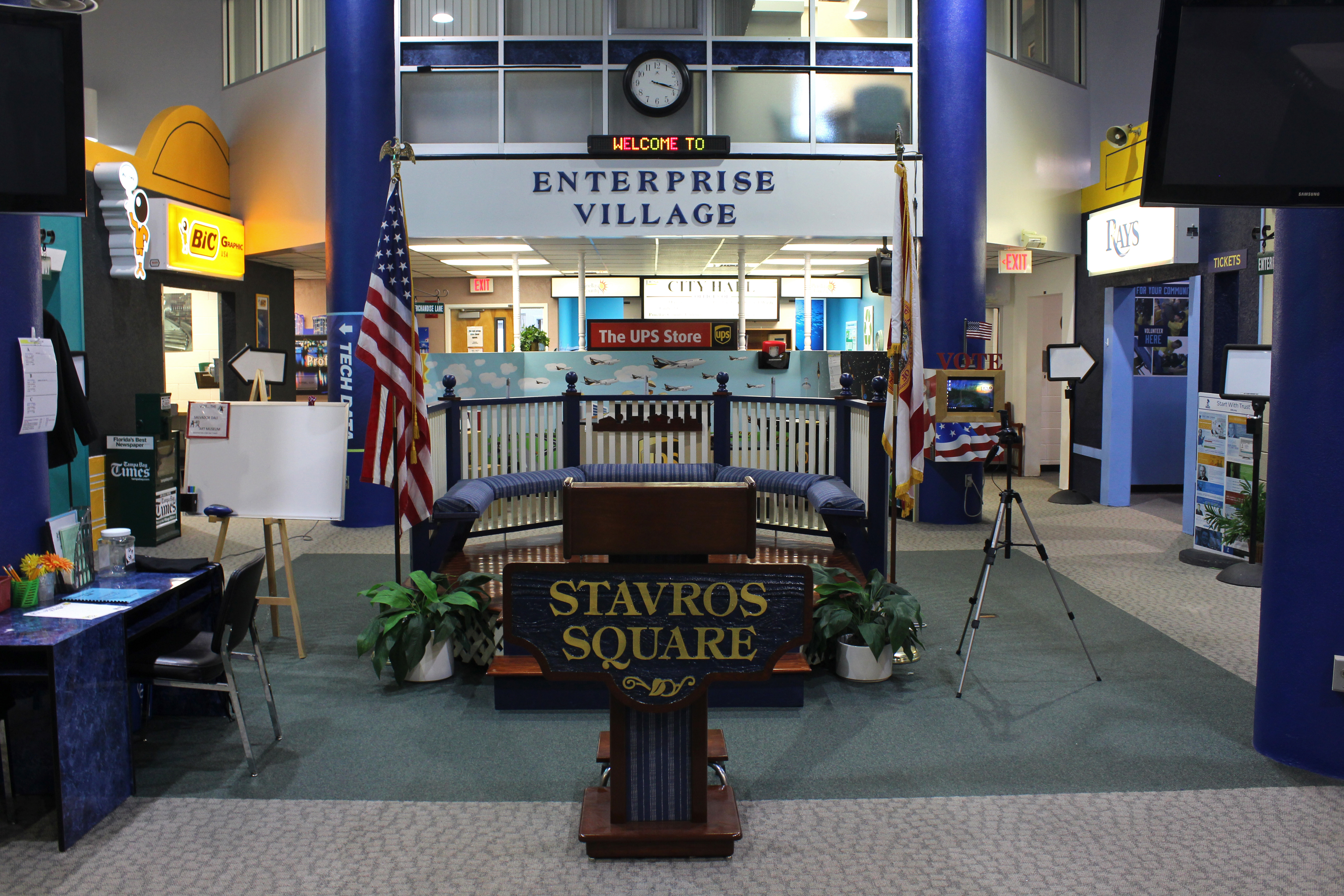
The "town square", known as Stavros Square, in Enterprise Village.

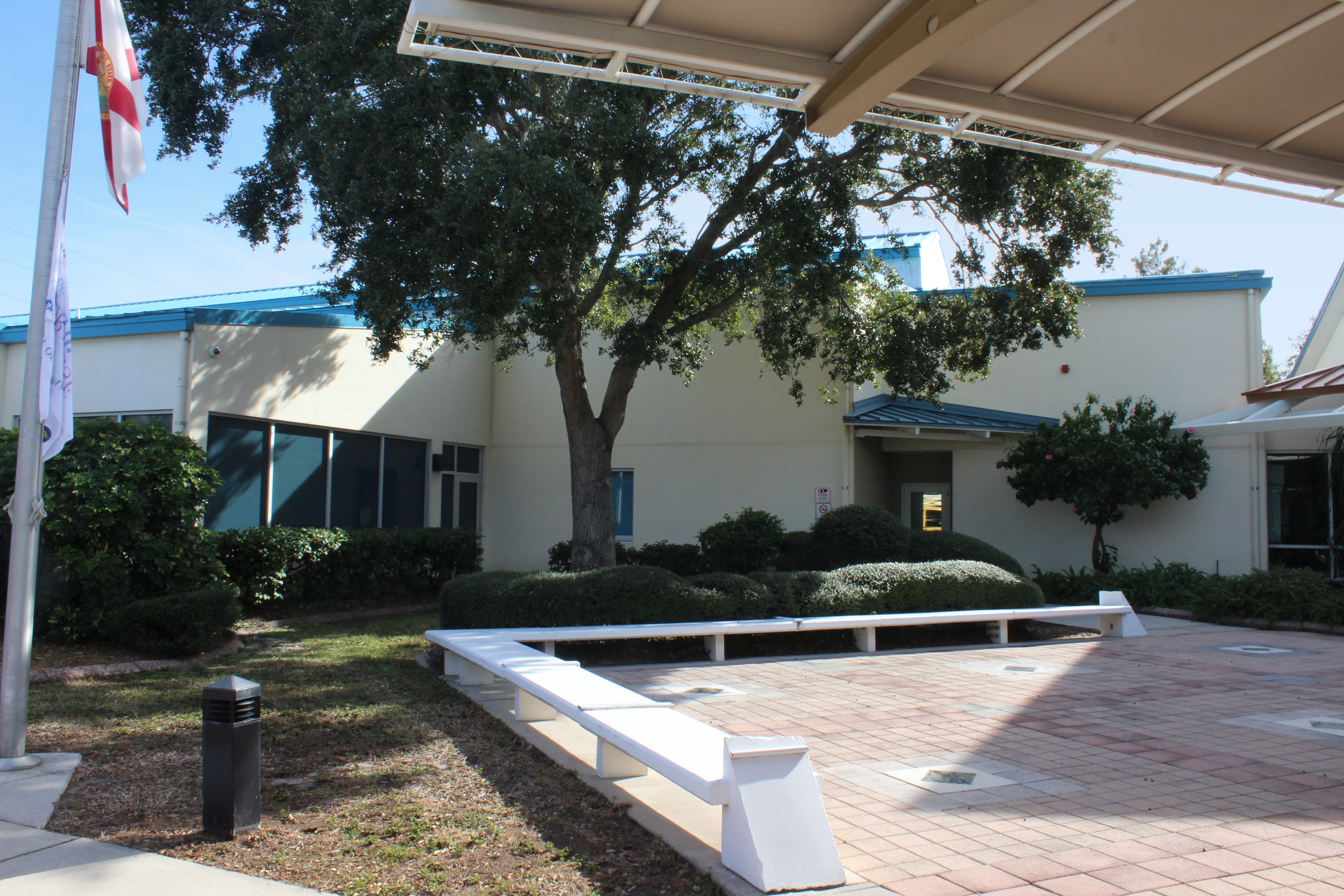
The exterior of the building which houses Enterprise Village, as seen from the Stavros Institute's entrance.

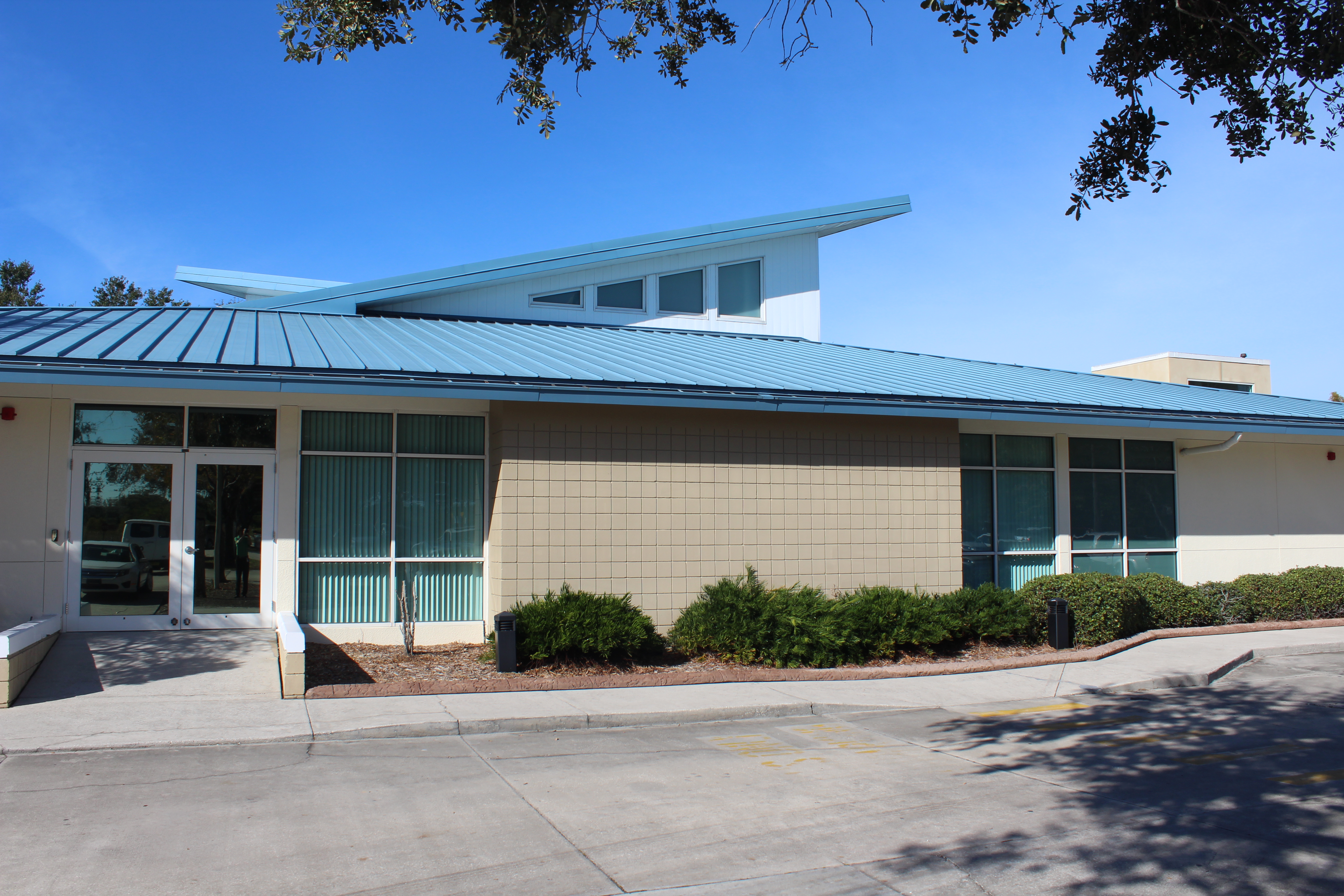
The exterior of the building which houses Finance Park, as seen from the Stavros Institute's parking lot.
