= Jorge A. Plasencia =

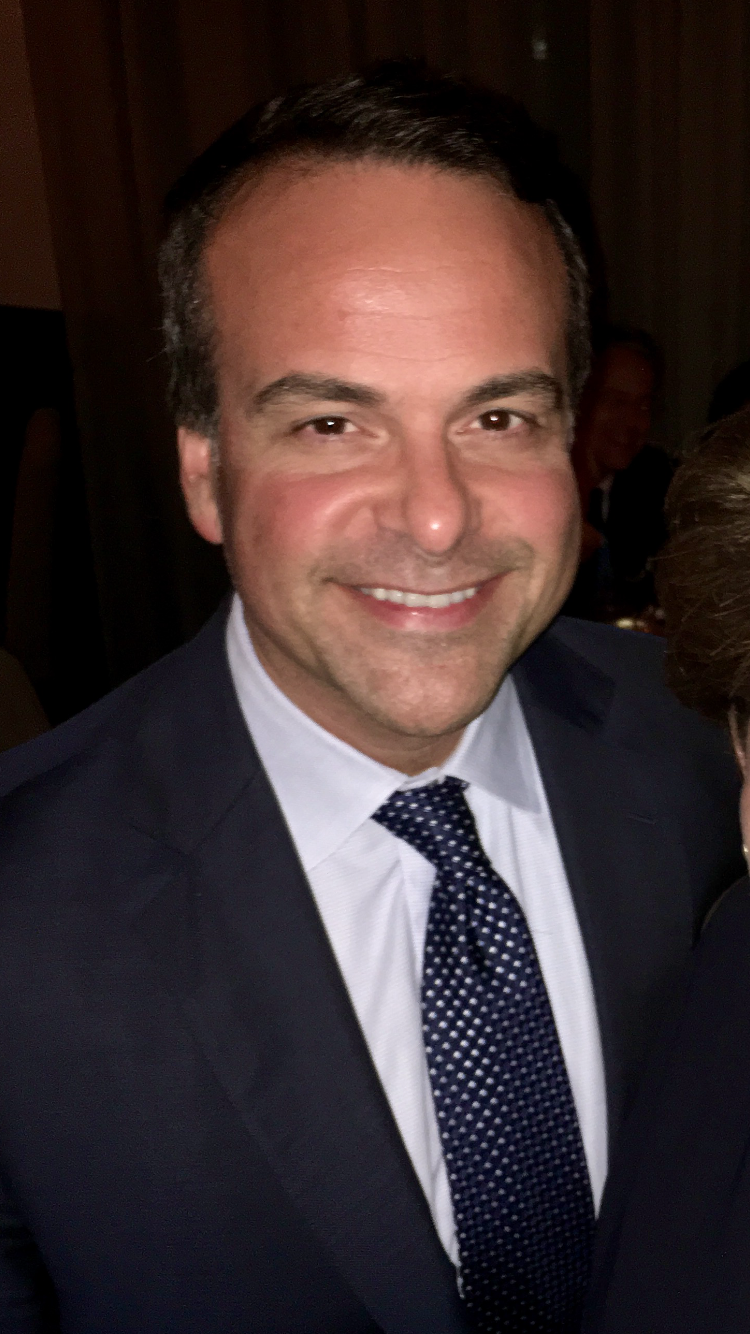
- Jorge A. Plasencia
- Born: June 13, 1974 (age 52); Miami, FL
- Education: Miami Dade College Barry University Northwestern University, Kellogg School of Management
- Occupations: Chairman and CEO of Republica Havas

Jorge A. Plasencia (born June 13, 1974, in Miami, FL) is a Cuban-American entrepreneur and civic leader. He is chairman and CEO of Republica Havas, a creative, media, and communications agency, that he co-founded in 2006 as a small start-up. Plasencia is the co-founder and chairman emeritus of Amigos For Kids, a Miami-based nonprofit started in 1991 to serve underprivileged children and families. He is also the former board chair of UnidosUS, the largest national Hispanic civil rights and advocacy organization in the United States.

== Career ==
Plasencia began his career as a 14-year-old intern at Miami's Radio Mambí, and by his senior year of high school he was the Spanish-language station's Promotions Director.

=== Florida Marlins ===
Plasencia's experience in professional sports started with the Miami Marlins in 1996, where he worked as the Major League club's first director of Hispanic Marketing, overseeing all sales and marketing programs. His efforts garnered him the Hispanic Marketer of the Year Award from the Greater Miami Chamber of Commerce in 1997, the same year the Marlins won their first World Series title.

=== Estefan Enterprises ===
During the height of the Latin music explosion in the late 1990s and early 2000s, Plasencia began working at Estefan Enterprises, the entertainment and hospitality conglomerate founded by superstar Gloria Estefan and her husband/producer Emilio Estefan. As vice president, Plasencia oversaw all marketing, publicity and corporate strategy for the company's various divisions, including artist management. He also helped launch the crossover career of pop phenomenon Shakira in key regions including the United States, Europe and Asia.

=== Univision ===
Prior to launching República, Plasencia was the corporate vice president and operating manager of Univision Radio, a post he got after leading marketing, corporate communications and public affairs for the company. While at Univision, Mr. Plasencia worked for the interests of diverse audiences and consumers on both local and national levels.

=== Republica Havas ===
Plasencia and his business partner, Luis Casamayor, cofounded Republica on November 13, 2006. They named the agency Republica in honor of Plasencia’s late father, Jorge R. Plasencia, and the bank where he served as a top executive for 30 years, Republic National Bank. Plasencia’s father was a prolific writer and authored Pinceladas Criollas, a book on Cuban culture and folklore. He was born in Cuba to the famous Plasencia tobacco family and exiled to the U.S. in 1961. After his death in 2004, Plasencia’s mother found a rejection letter from the CEO of Young & Rubicam from 1968 responding to Plasencia Sr.’s request to be considered for employment at the Madison Avenue agency as a writer. His family never knew he tried unsuccessfully to work in advertising in the U.S. When Plasencia shared this story with Casamayor, they both found it fitting to name their new venture in honor of Plasencia Sr.

Over the years, Republica Havas been ranked one of the fastest-growing companies in the U.S. by Inc. Magazine and has been ranked by Advertising Age as one of the top multicultural agencies in America. República has received national accolades for its creative and strategy, including several ADDY, Telly, Davey, and PRSA Silver Anvil awards. Plasencia and República have also been featured in Fortune Magazine, in a story titled "Jorge Plasencia's República: Mad Men, Miami-style."

In September 2018, Republica announced from Havas. The agency was renamed Republica Havas and now serves as Havas’ lead multicultural agency partner in the U.S.

=== Productions ===
Throughout his career, Plasencia has played a key role in the production of marquee events, including "The Last Goodbye," a September 11 tribute at the White House, as well as Super Bowl XXXIII, the 1997 World Series, Shakira's MTV Unplugged, the Latin Grammy Awards and the "Queen of Salsa" Celia Cruz's historic funeral, among many others.

=== Total Bank ===
Plasencia served as a director of TotalBank until the bank was acquired by Spain’s Banco Popular. He also chaired its Bank Secrecy Act (BSA) committee.

== Volunteer Activities ==
In 1991, at age 17, Plasencia co-founded Amigos For Kids, a nonprofit organization helping underprivileged children and families. Plasencia is currently chairman emeritus of Amigos For Kids, and his work with the organization earned him the March of Dimes' Humanitarian of the Year award, among others. Most recently, Plasencia was honored by Amigos For Kids with the organization’s highest honor, the Lollipop Award, which was instituted in memory of the late Lazaro Baby Lollipops Figueroa who was tragically abused by his mother and found dead in a dumpster wearing a shirt with a design of lollipops.

Dubbed one of America's most influential Hispanic leaders by both PODER and PRWeek, Plasencia served as chairman of the board of UnidosUS, the nation's largest Hispanic civil rights and advocacy organization. He is the first Cuban American, the first Floridian, and the youngest person to have received this recognition.

Plasencia is also a co-founder of the Congressional Hispanic Leadership Institute (CHLI); former chairman of the board of the Cuban American National Council (CNC). He also served on the advisory board of the Culture Marketing Council. He is a life member of the Council on Foreign Relations, and a member of the Florida Council of 100, and a former member of the Young Presidents' Organization (YPO). In 2004, Plasencia was nominated by President George W. Bush — and confirmed by the U.S. Senate — to serve on the advisory board of the Broadcasting Board of Governors' Office of Cuba Broadcasting (OCB). In Miami, in addition to serving on the board of Amigos For Kids, Plasencia is a trustee of the Adrienne Arsht Center for the Performing Arts and was formerly vice chair of the Miami Dade College Foundation. In 2020, Plasencia was named to the board of the Friends of the American Latino Museum, the group that is leading the creation of a Smithsonian Latino Museum on the Mall in Washington, DC. Plasencia is a former trustee of his alma mater, Barry University.

== Awards ==
Plasencia's was named one of PRWeek's 2012 40 Under 40; Ernst & Young's Entrepreneur Of The Year® CEO of the Year by the Greater Miami Chamber of Commerce; and Ultimate CEO by the South Florida Business Journal.

He has received numerous awards and honors, including the Florida Association of Women Lawyers' Child Advocate Award, the UNICEF For the Love of Children Award, the HPRA 2019 ¡BRAVO! Pioneer of the Year Award, Greater Miami Chamber of Commerce’s Salute to Miami’s Leaders Award, the NFL Hispanic Leadership Award, Miami Herald’s 20 under 40, Barry University’s Distinguished Alumni Award, the Cuban American Bar Association’s Presidential Award, Public Relations Society of America's Royal Palm Award, the Latino Justice/PRLDEF Lucero Corporate Award, Immaculata-La Salle High School’s Hall of Fame Saint John Bosco Alumni Award, the CAMACOL Entrepreneur of the Year Award, and PRWeek's 2012 40 Under 40. Plasencia also received the first Goya Hispanic Achievement Award an honor bestowed in 2012 at a sold-out, black-tie gala held at the New York Public Library, where he was selected by the Spain-U.S. Chamber of Commerce as the inaugural recipient of the award for his contributions to the growth of the U.S. Latino community and to the advertising and media industry in America.

== Education ==
Plasencia earned a bachelor's degree, with honors, from Barry University; he's an inductee to the Miami Dade College Hall of Fame; and attended the Advanced Management Education Program at Northwestern University, Kellogg School of Management. He graduated from Immaculata-La Salle High School in Miami, FL.
