= Ingrid Hoffmann =

Colombian-American television personality and restauranteur

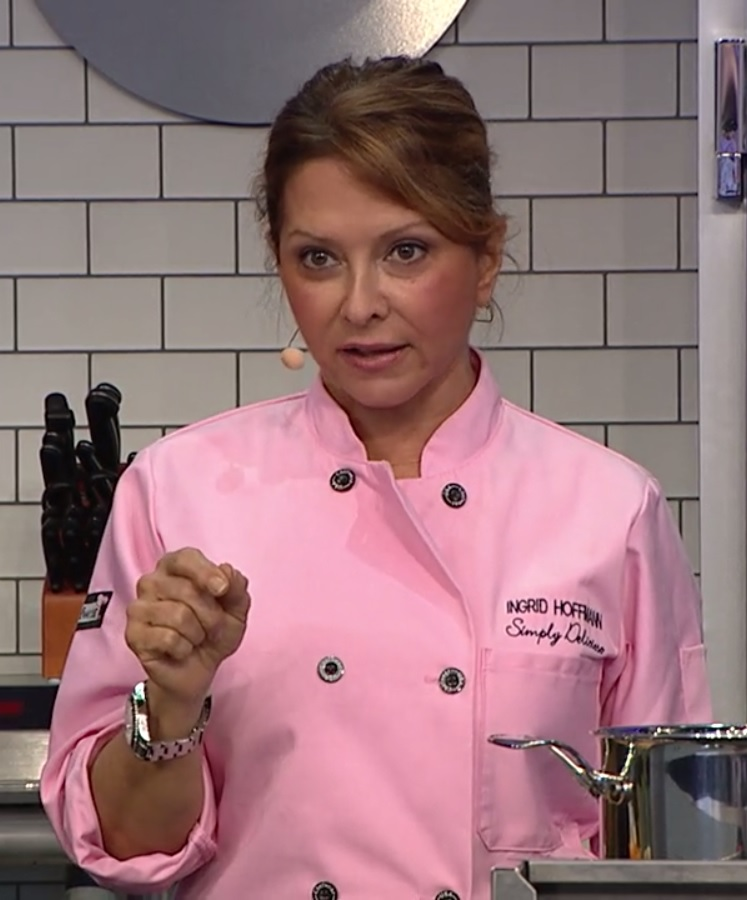
- Ingrid Hoffmann at the National Restaurant Association NRA Show in 2016
- Born: April 10, 1965 (age 61); Barranquilla, Colombia
- Culinary career
- Cooking style: Latin American cuisine
- Previous restaurant: Rocca
- Television show(s): Simply Delicioso Delicioso
- Website: http://www.delicioso.com/

Ingrid Hoffmann (born April 10, 1965) is a Colombian-American television personality and restaurateur, who hosts the Food Network series Simply Delicioso and the Spanish-language cooking and lifestyle show Delicioso on Galavisión. Her cookbook, Simply Delicioso: A Collection of Everyday Recipes with a Latin Twist, was published on February 8, 2008, by Clarkson Potter. The Spanish version is titled Delicioso: Una coleccion de mis recetas favoritas con un toque latino.

== Early life ==
Hoffmann was born in Barranquilla, Colombia, and raised in Cali and Curaçao. Her father was Billy Hoffmann, a pilot. Her mother, Yolanda Ibarnegaray, was a Cordon Bleu-trained chef who worked in restaurants and catering. Ingrid began cooking at a young age with her mother.

== Career ==
Hoffmann worked in modeling and acting, appearing in 16 telenovelas by age 20. She moved to Miami, Florida in 1985, where she opened La Capricieuse, a high-fashion luxury boutique in Miami's Coconut Grove.

Hoffmann opened a Miami restaurant with her mother and two business partners. Rocca, the first restaurant in Miami to feature tabletop cooking on heated lava rocks, opened in January 1993 and quickly became a local celebrity hot spot.

After hosting a cooking segment on a Miami-area television show in 2002, Hoffmann was offered a biweekly segment on the Spanish language morning show, Despierta America. Her own show, Delicioso, launched on DirecTV Para Todos in 2005. Delicioso now airs on Univision's cable network, Galavision. The Food Network contacted her the day after her March 2006 appearance on Martha, and Simply Delicioso debuted on the Food Network in July 2007.

Hoffmann contributes a monthly culinary column to People en Español. She has her own cookware line, Simply Delicioso with Ingrid Hoffmann, by T-Fal, and a cutlery and kitchen accessories line by Furi on Home Shopping Network.

Hoffman participated in the Hispanic "Got Milk?" campaign in November 2009 as part of Hispanic Heritage Month. She is a board member of New York City’s Food and Education Fund, and she supports Miami's Amigos For Kids (as a member of its board of directors), Believe for Colombia Foundations, and the Humane Society.

== Works ==
=== Books ===
- Latin d'Lite: Delicious Latin Recipes with a Healthy Twist (2013)
- Simply Delicioso: A Collection of Everyday Recipes with a Latin Twist (2008)

=== Television ===
- Delicioso (2005–2013)
- Simply Delicioso (2007–2009)
