= Navarro Discount Pharmacies =

Pharmacy chain in the United States

Navarro Discount Pharmacies, Inc.
- Type: Subsidiary
- Founded: 1940; 86 years ago, in Havana, Cuba
- Founder: José Navarro, Sr.
- Headquarters: Medley, Florida
- Number of locations: 34 stores (2026)
- Area served: South Florida
- Key people: Steve Kaczynski (CEO)
- Products: Retail - Pharmacy - Photo
- Revenue: ▲$350 million
- Parent: CVS Health (2014–present)
- Divisions: Pharmacy Department
- Website: navarro.com

Logo in 2008

Navarro Discount Pharmacies, Inc., frequently referred to as Navarro is a pharmacy chain, photo service, and pharmacy benefit manager in the United States. The company was acquired by CVS Health in September 2014 and is operated as a separate brand and business of CVS, headquartered in Miami, Florida. The company mainly operates in Miami-Dade and Broward Counties and currently has 28 stores. Navarro Discount Pharmacies has a 17% market share in South Florida, ahead of Walgreens and CVS/pharmacy. The company has more than 2,000 employees and annual sales of more than $350 million. Navarro leads the industry in terms of sales per store, sales per square foot, and prescriptions filled per store.

== History ==
=== Company history ===
In 1940, José Navarro, Sr. founded Navarro Discount Pharmacies in Havana, Cuba. The first store was located on Monte Street and had a large client base including the employees of the Power Company of Cuba. Years later, with the success of the first store, Navarro opened a second store.

After the political change in Cuba in 1961, the government confiscated the Navarro stores, forcing the family to flee to the United States. Upon arriving in Miami, José Navarro, Sr. cashed an insurance policy and used the $4000 to open a pharmacy on S.W. 8th Street and 15th Avenue across from the Tower Movie Theatre. They later moved to 13th Avenue in what would become the heart of Miami's Little Havana.

=== 2007 expansion and Acquisition by CVS ===
In 2007, the founding Navarro family ceded control of the company to investment firm MBF Healthcare Partners. In mid-2007 Navarro entered into an agreement to combine its operations with Sedano's Pharmacy. The two formed 31 stores, and operate under the Navarro brand name. As of 2010 there are a total of 28 stores. In 2014, the company was acquired by CVS Pharmacy. CVS said it would keep the Navarro's name and operate the business separately.
