= Virgin Media Television =

Virgin Media Television may refer to:

- Virgin Media Television (Ireland), formerly TV3 Group, a television broadcasting company in the Republic of Ireland
- Virgin Media Television (2007–10), UK broadcasting company now named Living TV Group

== See also ==
- Virgin Media, British telephone, television, and internet service provider
  - Virgin TV, its cable TV service
