= ThriftyComputer =

- Company type: Limited Liability Company
- Industry: Consumer Electronics
- Founded: 2004
- Founder: Elchonon Hellinger
- Headquarters: Miami, Florida, United States
- Key people: Elchonon Hellinger (CEO), Yosef Hellinger (COO)
- Products: cell phones, bluetooth headsets
- Services: Retail sales of discounted unlocked cell phones, headsets and other communication technologies
- Number of employees: 7 (2012)
- Website: http://www.thriftycomputer.com

ThriftyComputer is a Miami, Florida based internet business that sells discounted new and refurbished cell phones and other electronics. Founded by Elchonon Hellinger in 2004 when he was 19, he was later joined by his younger brother Yosef Hellinger. The company encountered financial troubles in 2009 and was forced to rebuild from the ground up. In addition, founder Hellinger has a debilitating chronic illness that has created significant challenges.

== Founder background ==
Since infancy, Elchonon Hellinger has suffered from Neurofibromatosis Type 2, which causes the continuous growth of benign tumors. By the age of 18, he was clinically deaf, and tumors on his hands made everyday work painful. To date, he has had over 20 surgeries, including an auditory brainstem implant at the age of 21 to regain his hearing.

== Business difficulties and subsequent recovery ==
From the company's beginning, selling out of box phones on eBay, by 2009 the company had formed an LLC, expanded its inventory to include other wireless and computer supplies, and was reporting $900,000 a year in sales. However, due to inexperience and internal mismanagement, the company had gone into over $100,000 in debt and lost all of its payment processing privileges from PayPal, Google Checkout and credit card processing companies.

Hellinger brought his younger brother Yosef in to help him turn things around. They sold whatever inventory they had left on eBay in order to pay off their creditors and slowly re-establish terms. Two years later, in 2011, the company reported between $40–70,000/month in sales from their website.
