= Seald Sweet International =

Citrus marketing company

Seald Sweet Growers, Inc.
- Formerly: Florida Citrus Exchange (1909-1959)
- Founded: 1909; 116 years ago
- Headquarters: Vero Beach, Florida, United States
- Parent: Greenyard USA

Seald Sweet International is a citrus marketing company based in Vero Beach, Florida. It was founded in 1909 as the Florida Citrus Exchange and is currently owned by Greenyard USA, with which it merged in 1998.

Seald Sweet was founded in 1909 as The Florida Citrus Exchange, a grower-owned cooperative and Florida’s oldest and largest fresh citrus marketing company. In 1959, celebrating the grower-owned cooperative's 50th anniversary, the Florida Citrus Exchange officially became Seald Sweet Growers, Inc.
