= Space Coast Credit Union =

American credit union

- Formerly: Patrick Air Force Base Credit Union
- Company type: Credit Union
- Industry: Financial services
- Founded: 1951; 75 years ago
- Headquarters: Melbourne, Florida, USA
- Number of locations: 68 Branches
- Area served: Alachua, Brevard, Broward, Charlotte, Citrus, Clay, Clay, Collier, Duval, Flagler, Hernando, Hillsborough, Indian River, Lake, Lee, Manatee, Marion, Martin, Miami-Dade, Monroe, Nassau, Okeechobee Orange, Osceola, Palm Beach, Pasco, Pinellas, Polk, Putnam, Sarasota, Seminole, St. Johns, St. Lucie, Sumter, Volusia Counties in Florida
- Key people: Shane Hoyle, CEO/President
- Products: Savings; Checking; Consumer loans; Mortgages; Credit cards; Investments; Online banking
- Total assets: US$ 9.2 billion (2026)
- Number of employees: 1269 (2026)
- Website: SCCU.com

Space Coast Credit Union (SCCU) is an American state-chartered credit union headquartered in Melbourne, Florida. It is insured and regulated by the National Credit Union Administration (NCUA). As of 2026, SCCU had over 685,000 members and over $9 billion in assets, making it the third largest credit union in Florida.

== History ==
SCCU was formed in 1951 as the Patrick Air Force Base Credit Union, serving Patrick Space Force Base (at the time known as Patrick Air Force Base). The credit union started with $372 and 7 members.

The company changed its name to Space Coast Credit Union in 1980.

In 2009, SCCU merged with Eastern Financial Florida Credit Union, growing SCCU's assets to $3.2 billion and 380,000 members. Prior to the merger, bad loans and investments made during the 2008 financial crisis put Eastern Financial into distress. NCUA took control of Eastern Financial and turned operations over to SCCU.

In 2011, SCCU spun off its Tampa Bay area operations to MidFlorida Credit Union, gaining MidFlorida 16,000 members, 6 branch locations, and $115 million in assets.

Alive Credit Union acquired two of SCCU's branches in Jacksonville in 2012.

== Membership ==
Membership at SCCU is open to anyone who works or lives in one of 34 Florida counties: Alachua, Brevard, Broward, Charlotte, Citrus, Clay, Clay, Collier, Duval, Flagler, Hernando, Hillsborough, Indian River, Lake, Lee, Manatee, Marion, Martin, Miami-Dade, Monroe, Nassau, Okeechobee Orange, Osceola, Palm Beach, Pasco, Pinellas, Polk, Putnam, Sarasota, Seminole, St. Johns, St. Lucie, Sumter, or Volusia.
