= Pearl Art and Craft Supply =

American art supply store chain

- Industry: Art supplies
- Founded: 1933; 93 years ago
- Founder: Robert Perlmutter
- Defunct: August 26, 2014
- Fate: Bankruptcy
- Headquarters: Fort Lauderdale, Florida, United States
- Owner: Darren Perlmutter

Pearl Art and Craft Supply (formerly known as Pearl Paint) was a chain of art supply stores. Pearl was founded in 1933 by Robert Perlmutter. It was headquartered in Fort Lauderdale, Florida and had stores located throughout the U.S. including New Jersey, Florida, New York, and Massachusetts.

The chain once consisted of as many as 18 stores in total. After 81 years in business, a cash skimming scandal and subsequent bankruptcy forced the shuttering of company stores beginning in 2010 and culminated with the final closure of the Fort Lauderdale headquarters on August 26, 2014. As of 2024, the Pearl brand and trademark are now owned by Robert's son, Darren Perlmutter.

== History ==
The New York Pearl Paint store served professional artists and the trades for decades at its Canal Street location in lower Manhattan, before it became a commercial chain. The store occupied a multi-floor building and maintained a large inventory of art supplies.

The Canal Street location was near many art schools, including NYU, Cooper Union, The School of Visual Arts, Parsons School of Design, and the Fashion Institute of Technology. The area also contained other art supply retailers, including New York Central Supply, Utrecht Linens, and David Davis that helped create a regional destination for commerce in professional art materials. Artist studios and galleries were present in the surrounding neighborhoods of Tribeca, SoHo, and Chelsea, particularly during the last quarter of the 20th century. Pearl Paint was known for its crowded, multi-floor store supplied a large inventory and diverse variety of materials, while adding to the identity of the sometimes quirky retail stores nearby. The subsequent renovation proposal of the building used this iconic identity and history in its marketing.

The slow demise of Pearl Paint began in 1996 when a box of cash broke open while being shipped by UPS. The quantity of cash inside the parcel led to an investigation that revealed a daily skimming of the store's cash receipts, leading eventually to a prison sentence for Robert Perlmutter, to management from outside the family, and to subsequent bankruptcy. Also cited in this 2017 interview with the family were a lack of interest in the art supply industry, a decline in sales after the September 11, 2001 attacks, illness, all compounding the difficulties from the criminal settlement against Robert Perlmutter which barred him from participating in any management or decision making.

Immediately preceding the closure of the Fort Lauderdale headquarters building was the closures of the South Miami branch on July 20, 2014, and their famous New York City flagship location on April 17, 2014. Pearl Art sold art supplies, such as colored pencils, paint, sketch pencils, etc.
