= Reach Federal Credit Union =

Credit union

- Type: Credit union
- Industry: Financial services
- Founded: 1971
- Headquarters: Menlo Park, California, United States
- Area served: Tyco International; Tyco Electronics; Covidien; Employees and family members
- Key people: Christine L. Petro, President/CEO; Rong Guo, VP of Finance; Ann Lubeck-Brown, VP of Member Services; Elaine Laroa, VP of Member Development; Steven Miller, VP of Information Services
- Products: Savings; checking; consumer loans; mortgages; credit cards; online banking
- Total assets: $84 million USD (2026)
- Number of employees: 25

Reach Federal Credit Union (formerly Tyco Federal Credit Union) is a federally chartered credit union headquartered in Menlo Park, California. It serves employees of Tyco International, TE Connectivity and Covidien. The credit union has offices in North Carolina, Pennsylvania, and Florida. It is regulated by the National Credit Union Administration (NCUA), which also insures its deposits. A volunteer board of directors, elected by and from the membership, governs the credit union.

== History ==
Reach Federal Credit Union was founded in 1971 as Raychem Employees' Federal Credit Union by employees of Raychem Corporation. It was founded as a non-profit financial service cooperative dedicated to helping its members get ahead financially. After Tyco International acquired Raychem in 1999, it changed its name and expanded its field of membership to include all Tyco International employees. In 2007 Tyco Electronics and Tyco Healthcare were divested from Tyco International. This modified Reach CU's field of membership to include the three separate organizations Tyco International, Tyco Electronics (now TE Connectivity), and Tyco Healthcare (now Covidien).

By 2013, due to divestitures, mergers and acquisitions by its corporate sponsors, the credit union's field of membership now includes ADT, Atkore, Covidien, Elo Touch Solutions, Mallinckrodt, Pentair, TE Connectivity and Tyco International employees and their families. Since only one of the sponsor companies still has the name Tyco, on August 1, 2013, Tyco Federal Credit Union became Reach Federal Credit Union.

In 2016 Reach Federal Credit Union merged into Xceed Financial (Federal Credit Union).

Before merging with Reach, Xceed Financial Credit Union was a $900 million credit union with negative earnings for 2015.
