= Equitrac =

Software company in Canada

Equitrac Corporation
- Type: Subsidiary
- Industry: document output management and cost recovery
- Founded: Miami, Florida (1977)
- Products: Equitrac Express, Office and Professional; TouchPoint Console
- Parent: Kofax

Equitrac is a global software company that provides document cost management (auditing, allocation, recovery) and output management solutions for printers, copiers and multifunction devices. Its target markets are professional services firms, general office and enterprise plus hospitality and higher education. The company has more than a 70% market share among large law firms.

Equitrac is headquartered in Plantation, Florida; has offices in the United States, Canada and Europe and global distribution via a network of distributors and resellers. The company is a Microsoft Silver Certified Partner.

== History ==
The company was launched by John Kane and George Wilson in 1977 as a regional distributor of copier control systems with five employees. It was long best known for selling the hardware that attaches to photocopiers and tracks their use for billing law firms' clients. In the 1980s, Equitrac was twice named to the INC. 500 list as one of the country's fastest growing private companies. In 1991 it bought out its largest competitor, and then in 1992 went public and was listed on the NASDAQ Exchange.

=== Strategy shift ===
Technology has advanced since Equitrac's founding, but the promise of a "paperless" office never materialized. Instead, offices use more paper than ever before, racking up increasingly large copying and printing bills. Equitrac changed gears to solidify its lead and grab more market share. The company began diversifying by developing software embedded in networked copiers, printers and multifunction devices, from manufacturers such as Xerox, Ricoh, Canon and Sharp. That switch also ushered in a fundamental shift in how Equitrac earned its money: while previously it helped companies track costs that would later be charged back to clients, now Equitrac helps those firms cut paper and ink costs.

In 1999, top executives of the publicly traded firm wanted to cash out but found the thinly traded shares were nearly non-liquid. Eventually, New York-based private equity firm Cornerstone Partners purchased Equitrac and took it private. The $74 million purchase was financed in part by the shares of the executives, but mostly with $24.6 million from Cornerstone and $44 million in loans.

In 2000 Equitrac acquired Software Metrics Inc. based in Waterloo, Ontario, near several universities with strong software programming curricula, who had been working with Equitrac since 1998 under a technology licensing agreement.

In 2002 Michael Rich joined the company as CEO. Rich had previously run Ernst & Young's law firm consulting practice, helped launch AT&T Corporation's Internet business and ran the publicly held Netspeak in Boca Raton. To cut costs at Equitrac, he outsourced its hardware business to Celestica, centralized its software development and technical support at the former Software Metrics location and shuttered its Florida manufacturing plant and software development centres. In 2004, the company relocated its 80 South Florida employees from Coral Gables to Plantation.

In 2005 Rich was ranked one of the top CEO's in Florida by the South Florida's CEO magazine. In addition, Mr. Rich has done numerous press conferences with various public figures such as Florida Governor Jeb Bush and former Speaker of the House Newt Gingrich.

== Acquisition ==
In May 2011, Nuance Communications, Inc. announced plans to acquire Equitrac for $157 million USD. The deal closed in July 2011.

In November 2018, Kofax announced plans to purchase Nuance Document Imaging which included Equitrac. The deal closed February 1, 2019

== Products ==
Among Equitrac's product lines are both hardware and software items, although Equitrac is known for its PageCounter line of document management consoles.

=== Software ===
Equitrac's software offerings include Equitrac Professional, a document accounting and cost management tool, marketed toward large legal and AEC companies

For the general office environment, Equitrac market their Equitrac Office product and for educational establishments and universities, Equitrac offer Equitrac Express. Both Office and Express are based on the same core module with specific features aligned to each market segment.
