= Suncoast Credit Union =

Credit union headquartered in Tampa, Florida

- Formerly: Hillsborough County Teachers Credit Union (1934–1976); Suncoast Schools Federal Credit Union (1976–2013)
- Company type: Credit union
- Industry: Financial services
- Founded: January 31, 1934; 92 years ago
- Headquarters: Tampa, Florida, United States
- Number of locations: 79 branch banks (2025)
- Area served: Florida
- Key people: Kevin Johnson (president and CEO)
- Services: Banking; Financing; Insurance
- Revenue: 282,473,468 United States dollar (2014)
- Total assets: US$17.47 billion (2025)
- Total equity: US$1.74 billion (2025)
- Members: 1.3 million (2025)
- Number of employees: 2,620 (2025)
- Website: suncoast.com

Suncoast Credit Union is a credit union headquartered in Tampa, Florida. The credit union was formed in 1934 to originally serve teachers in Hillsborough County and later expanded to serve school employees within the state's suncoast region. Since December 2013, the credit union has been open to anyone who lives, works, attends school, or worships in the 39 counties it serves. As of March 2026, Suncoast has $17.47 billion in assets and more than 1.3 million members.

== History ==
The credit union began as Hillsborough County Teachers Credit Union on January 31, 1934, with the intention to help teachers working in Hillsborough County. The credit union amended its charter in 1953 to open membership to teachers in the nearby Citrus, DeSoto, Hardee, Hernando, and Pasco counties. By 1960, membership was opened to Charlotte, Levy, Manatee, and Sumter counties as well as to all employees of schools in counties their charter extended to. To reflect its changed field of membership, the credit union changed its name to Suncoast Schools Credit Union in 1975. In 1978, it converted to a federal charter and changed its name to Suncoast Schools Federal Credit Union. In December 2013, the credit union obtained a state charter and changed its name to Suncoast Credit Union.

In December 2019, the credit union was in the process of purchasing Apollo Bank, which was expected to be completed by May 2020. However, the purchase was withdrawn as a result of the COVID-19 pandemic. The purchase would have been Florida's largest-ever bank acquisition by a credit union.

Suncoast Credit Union reached one million members in December 2021, becoming the 10th credit union in the United States to reach one million members.
