= Kre8tiveworkz =

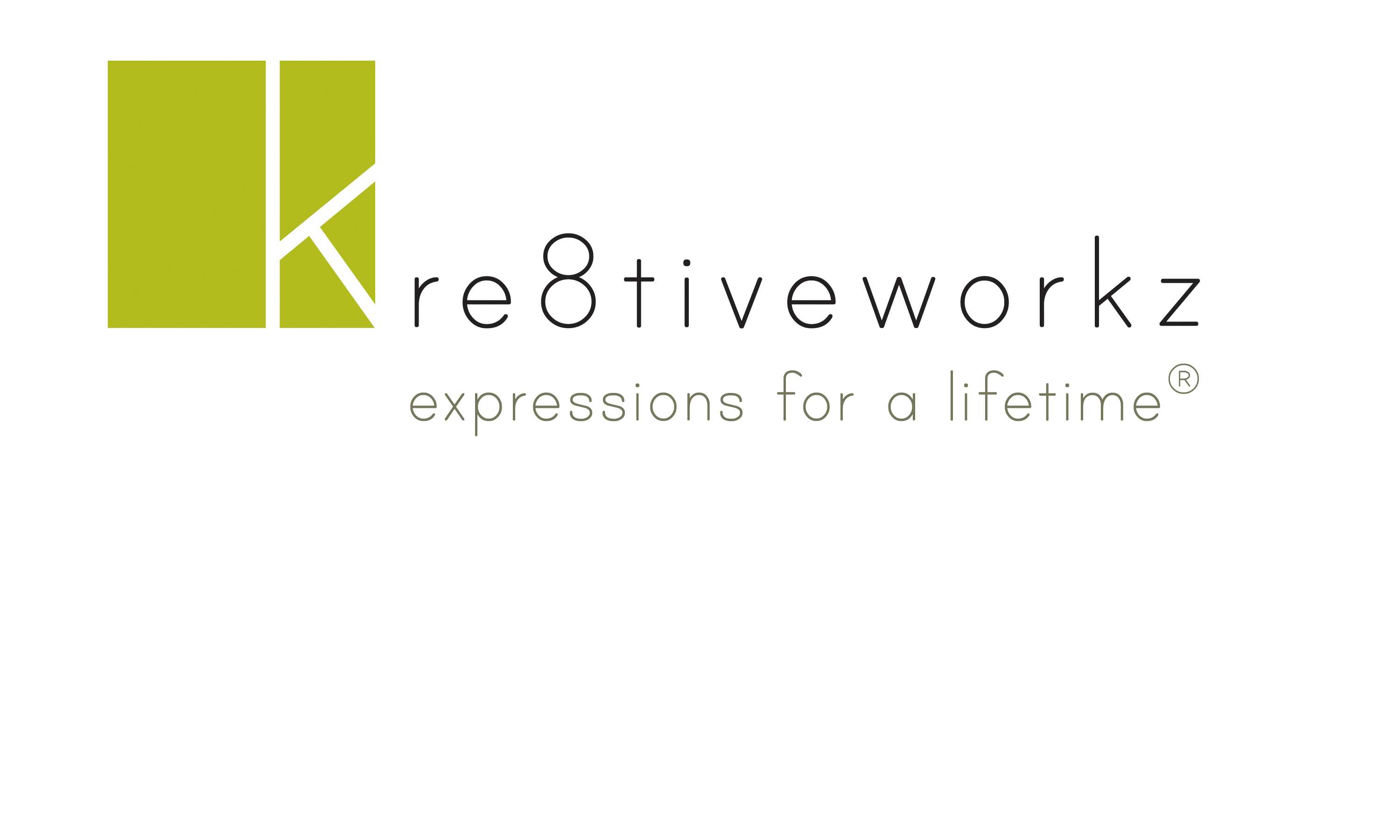

Kre8tiveworkz, a privately owned American company based in Pembroke Pines, Florida, is the original manufacturer and designer of Reality Rhyming personalized poetry gifts worldwide. Reality Rhyming is a poetic writing style that uses a person's name and background information about a person's life and their experiences to create a story of rhyme for a particular occasion that's based on the premise "If Your Life Was A Poem, What Would It Say?".

== Background ==
Founded in 2004 by 34-year-old Barbara Goleman Senior High Special Education Teacher and American poet Todd Edwards, who started the company by selling poetry in the form of people's lives by word of mouth. He was born in Hollywood, Florida in 1970 to his parents Michell and Joan Rubinstein. Edwards' birth name is Todd Edward Rubinstein and is also an avid tennis player, being formally ranked #1 in Florida, 9th in United States (2006 - singles, Men's 30's) and #1 in Florida, 8th in United States (2008 - doubles - Men's 30's).

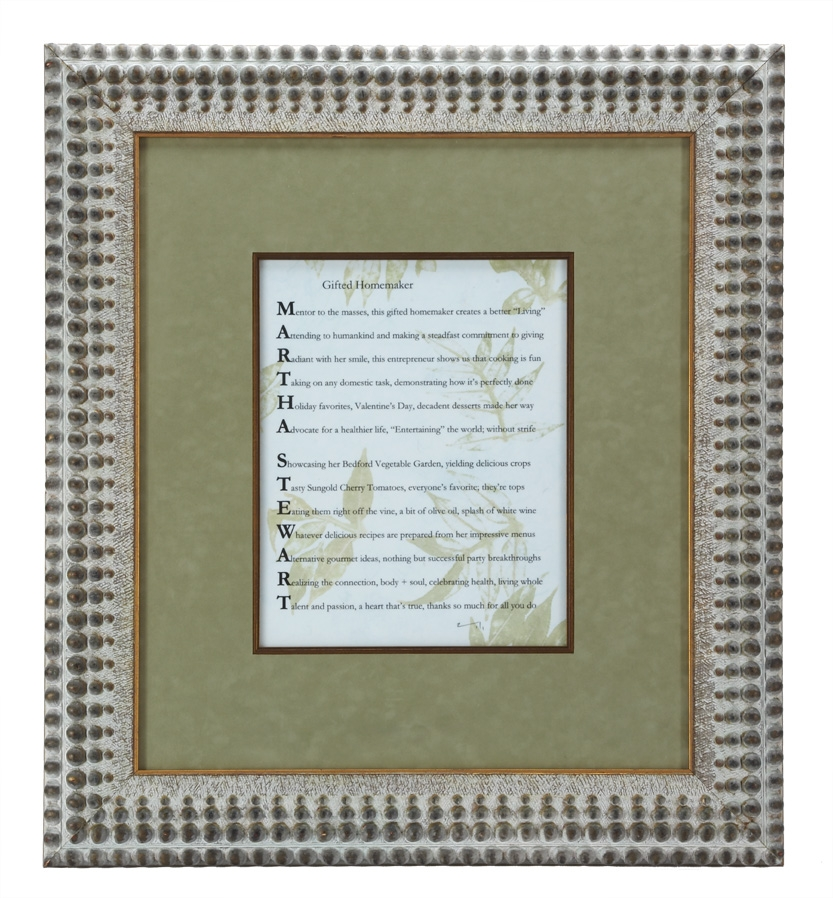
Sample Kre8tiveworkz Reality Rhyming personalized poetry masterpiece designed for Martha Stewart

=== Company Identity ===
In 2006, the Kre8tiveworkz personalized gift company redesigned its identity, along with branding the poetic writing style of Reality Rhyming. The slogans (2006) "Expressions for a Lifetime", (2007) "If Your Life Was A Poem, What Would It Say?", (2008) "If Your Pet's Life Was A Poem, What Would It Say?" and "If Your Wedding Was A Poem, What Would It Say?" created a mass public appeal by being promoted in ad campaigns, a practice the company continues to the present day. The company has showcased its collections in art shows, at special events, on televised newscasts, including Entertainment Tonight, the Today Show, ABC's Extreme Makeover: Home Edition and other media outlets.

Some celebrities and organizations that Kre8tiveworkz has designed poetry for have been Elton John, Ellen DeGeneres, Maria Sharapova, Oprah Winfrey, Justin Timberlake, Martha Stewart, NFL Commissioner Roger Goodell, Kathie Lee Gifford, Donny Deutsch, Regis Philbin, Kelly Ripa, Paris Hilton, Hoda Kotb, will.i.am, James Blake, Kevin Harrington, Daymond John, Jeana Keough of the Housewives of OC, Keegan-Michael Key of MADtv, Kimbo Slice MMA Fighter, Lisa Stanley of KRTH 101, NBC and Fox Television Networks, Carling Bassett, Nadia Petrova, the Academy Awards, Sandals Resorts, Hard Rock Hotels, Miami-Dade County Public Schools, the Miami Heat, Lorraine Thomas and television news personalities such as Lynn Martinez, Louis Aguirre and Belkys Nerey of WSVN, Cyndi Edwards and Dave Nemeth of the nationally syndicated show "Daytime", Bob Mayer, Trina Robinson and Kelly Craig of "South Florida Today" and Gayle Guyardo, Jennifer Hill and Alicia Roberts of WFLA.

In 2006, Kre8tiveworkz founded the "Kre8tiveworkz Humanitarian Award" which is an inspirational award given to individuals who have demonstrated outstanding service to their community and have contributed to making the world a better place. Winners include: 2006 Oprah Winfrey, 2007 Karen Embden of Miami-Dade County Public Schools, 2008 Bob Mayer, Trina Robinson and Kelly Craig of WTVJ and 2009 Janet Reno.

=== Charitable Organizations ===
Kre8tiveworkz has been linked to charitable organizations such as Fran Drescher's Cancer Schmancer, the American Heart Association, the Andy Roddick Foundation, the Make-A-Wish Foundation, Shriners Children's Hospital, Adopt-A-Classroom, Metro Zoo, Women of Tomorrow, ICAN, the Ann Storke Foundation, Dress for Success and the Sydney & Alexandria Cohen Foundation.

== Management ==
The current president and CEO is Todd Edwards and the current director is his father, Michell Rubinstein.
