= Florida Tile =

American porcelain and ceramic manufacturer

Florida Tile is a U.S.-based manufacturer of porcelain and ceramic tile. It is one of the United States' largest producers of glazed and unglazed porcelain wall, floor tile and ceramic wall tile. It is also an importer and distributor of ceramic and porcelain wall and floor tile, natural stone, glass and metal tiles.

Established in 1954, the company originally intended to fill a market niche. However, as the company grew, its product line gradually expanded and it became known for innovation, being responsible for a number of firsts in the ceramic tile industry.

In 2003, the company employed 950 people and had annual revenue of around $120 million. It manufactures its products in Lawrenceburg, Kentucky, and distributes products via its distribution center there to a network of 60 distributors, 35 company owned branches, and through big box and third party channels.

== History ==
=== The Sikes years ===
Florida Tile was established in Lakeland, Florida when Leon Sikes Sr. and his sons James "Jimmie" Sikes and Leon Sikes Jr. purchased a run-down tile plant for $8,000 in March 1954. At the time the company produced one specialty trim shape of tile that was difficult to find. As the industry grew away from small format, extruded, and two-tone effect floor tiles, Florida Tile began to adopt new technology to manufacture the increasingly complex products the market demanded.

Within 20 years it became the U.S.'s second-largest manufacturer of ceramic tile, and the company changed its name to Sikes Corporation in 1972 to reflect the addition of a carpet manufacturing plant in Lawrenceburg. Jimmie Sikes became the Chairman of the Board during this time.

However, the venture into carpet manufacturing proved to be ill-advised for the company. Changes in the carpet business left the Sikes Corporation with new plants and old technology. By the mid-1970s, it had suffered a $13 million loss and was close to having a negative net worth. Kelly Norton, Florida Tile's VP of Marketing at the time, speculated that, "The only reason the banks didn't foreclose on us was because they didn't know what to do with an old tile plant."

The company began to again thrive by the late 1970s, and would do so for many years, even after the death of Sikes from a massive heart attack in 1982. The 1980s were a good time for Florida Tile - several times it was named on the Forbes list of best small businesses, and twice listed by USA Today as one of the best performing stocks of the decade.

=== Shifting ownership ===
As the 1980s wound down, much of the original leadership began to retire. By 1990, Florida Tile was sold to Premark International Inc. for $201 million.

In 1999, Illinois Tool Works bought Premark with a stock purchase. ITW later identified Florida Tile as a non-core business and hired CS First Boston to sell the company in March 2002. The auction was unsuccessful as Florida Tile was underperforming at the time.

By November 2003, Florida Tile was purchased by Milestone Merchant Partners' investment fund, MMP Capital Partners. This was followed by an announcement in early 2004 that the Lakeland tile plant was to be shut down. Then-CEO Matt Galvez cited a shift in consumer preference from basic wall tile to designer products manufactured by the company's facilities in Kentucky and Georgia.

In 2006, Florida Tile was sold to the Panariagroup of Italy in a deal brokered by Murry Gunty of Blackstreet Capital. The result was a $25 million investment in Florida Tile, resulting in the opening of a state-of-the-art production line in Lawrenceburg, Kentucky, in September 2007. Through continued investments, this facility now has the technology to produce large sized, through-body porcelain and uses high-speed printers to create tile patterns.

== Industry firsts ==
In anticipating and meeting demand through the use of technology, Florida Tile marked a number of firsts within the United States and within the industry.

- 1981 - first to produce pressed floor tile in the United States market.
- 1990 - first to produce large format glazed wall tile with a single pass through the kiln.
- 1996 - among the first to install Roto-color process machines in the United States.
- 2007 - first tile manufacturer to attain Greenguard Certification for low chemical emissions, indoor air quality and third party certification for the production of true porcelain tile by the Porcelain Tile Certification Agency.
- 2008 - One of the first factories in the United States to produce large format through-body porcelain tile.
- 2009 - Introduced a program to represent a host of environmental initiatives. These include recycling materials during the production process to keeping unsellable tiles out of landfills by donating them to local and national charitable organizations.
- 2009 - First domestic manufacturer to add high-speed printers to production lines to produce High Definition Porcelain (HDP).
- 2013 - First recipient of the inaugural CTDA Supplier of the Year Award, recognizing a supplier providing the most value to its members and the ceramic tile and stone industry.

== Green initiatives ==
Florida Tile was actively engaged in environmental issues as far back as the late 1970s and early 1980s, when it hired a full-time environmental engineer.

It was also the first to attain the Greenguard Environmental Institute certification for all of its products. This certification states that their product line produces no emissions of hazardous chemicals known as VOCs (volatile organic compounds) in indoor environments.

As part of their CARES program, Florida Tile began its partnership in 2006 with Tile Partners for Humanity. Through this group, Florida Tile has been able to donate material to local and national organizations such as Mountain Re-Source and Operation Compassion.

In recent years, Florida Tile also began to be honored for its efforts to manufacture products using environmentally friendly processes. In 2011, it was recognized by the College of Agriculture at the University of Kentucky for its achievements in resource sustainability practices. That same year, it was honored by the Kentucky Energy Alliance for its commitment to energy management, promoting sustainable practices and creating an impact at state, regional and global levels. In 2012, Florida Tile received Green Squared Certification for all tile lines produced in its Kentucky plant.

== Humanitarian contributions ==
During the 2010 Coverings trade show, Florida Tile was given the Award of Excellence from West Virginia-based Mountain Re-Source. The recognition was for the company's humanitarian efforts in Appalachia and its response to the 2010 Haiti earthquake. At the time of the recognition, Florida Tile had donated $600,000 worth of material to Mountain Re-Source.
