= MidFlorida Credit Union =

American credit union

MIDFLORIDA Credit Union
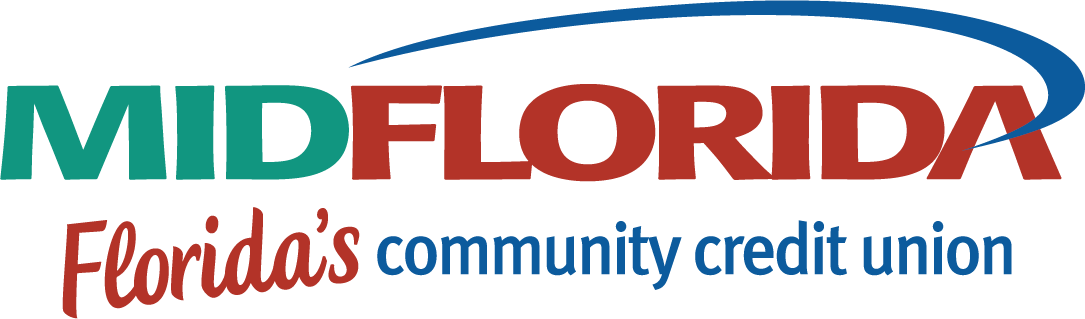
- Logo since 2009

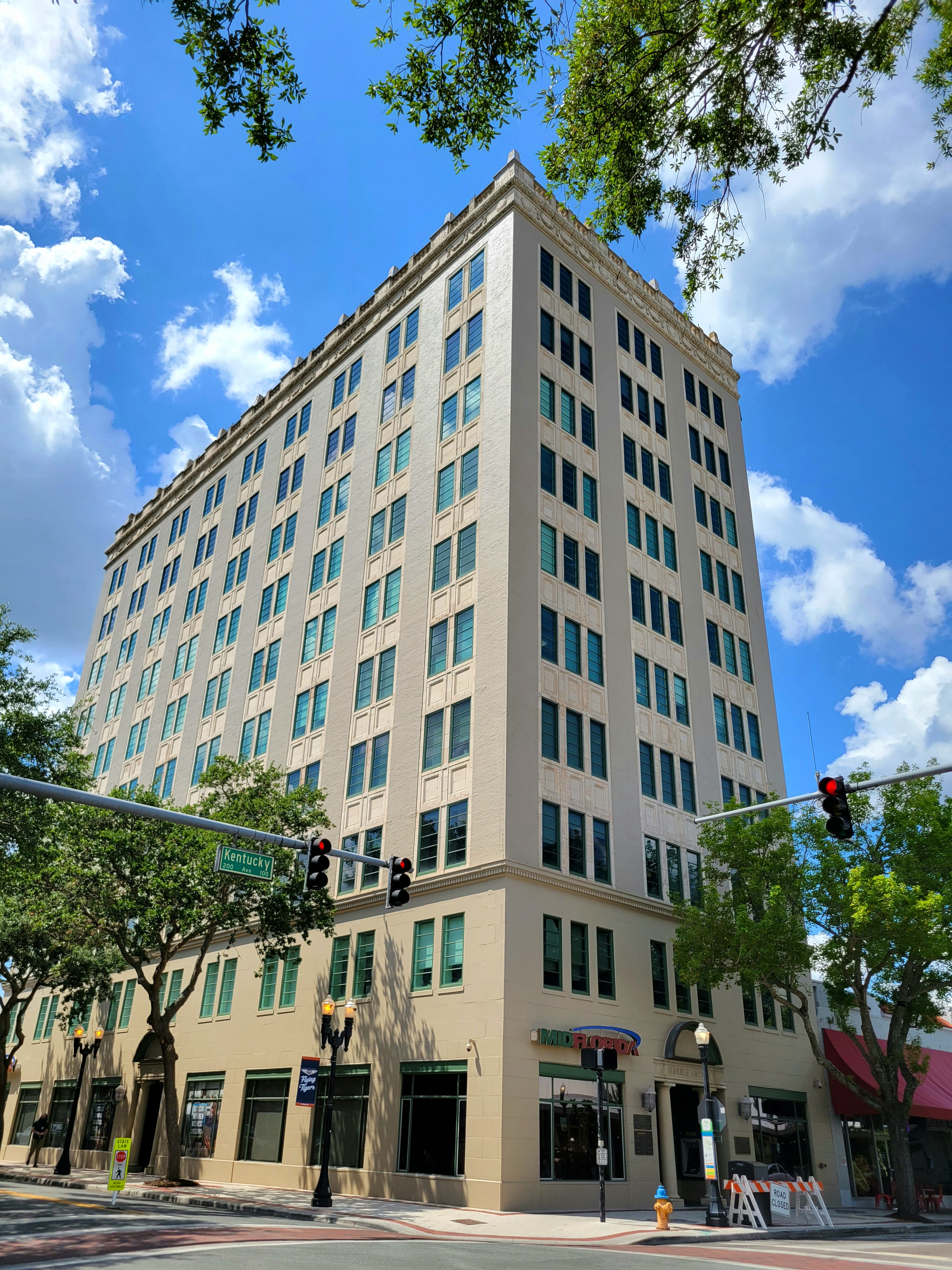
- Headquarters at the Marble Arcade Building in downtown Lakeland.
- Type: Credit Union
- Industry: Financial services
- Founded: 1954; 72 years ago
- Headquarters: Lakeland, Florida, United States
- Number of locations: 65 (Jan, 2026)
- Key people: Steve Moseley (CEO)
- AUM: $8 billion (Jan, 2026)
- Website: www.midflorida.com

MidFlorida Credit Union (stylized as MIDFLORIDA) is a credit union based in Lakeland, Florida. MidFlorida has 65+ locations throughout the state of Florida, 421,180 members and $8 billion in assets as of January 1, 2026, making MidFlorida the fourth-largest credit union in the state of Florida. MidFlorida Credit Union is regulated by the National Credit Union Administration (NCUA) as a federally insured state-chartered credit union. MidFlorida was officially chartered in 1935 and was assigned NCUA charter number 68600.

== History ==
MidFlorida Credit Union was founded in 1954 in Lakeland as the Polk County Teachers Credit Union, and currently serves a large part of the Central Florida area. In 2002, MidFlorida expanded its community charter to include Okeechobee, Sumter and Hardee counties. MidFlorida became a state-chartered credit union in 2009, shortening the company name to MidFlorida Credit Union.

=== Bay Gulf Merger ===
On June 15, 2010, MidFlorida and Bay Gulf Credit Union announced a merger between the two credit unions, which added Bay Gulf's approximately 20,000 members and $140 million assets to MidFlorida then 130,000 members and $1.4 billion assets. As a result of the merger, MidFlorida gained access to the Tampa Bay area and expanded services to all or part of 14 Florida counties.

=== Space Coast acquisition ===
Near the end of 2011, MidFlorida Credit Union and Space Coast Credit Union announced that MidFlorida would acquire six Tampa-area branches from Space Coast, based in Melbourne, Florida. This acquisition added 16,000 members to MidFlorida for a total of 35,000 members and 14 branches in Hillsborough, Pasco and Pinellas counties.

=== Indian River Credit Union merger ===
In 2012, MidFlorida Credit Union merged with Indian River Federal Credit Union, based in Vero Beach, Florida. The merger added Indian River's 9,100 members and $55.5 million assets to MidFlorida, giving the credit union two additional branches in Vero Beach and Sebastian, Florida. These conversions expanded MIDFLORIDA's ability to provide services across the state, from the Tampa Bay market (Hillsborough and Pinellas County) to the Treasure Coast.

=== 2019 mergers ===
In November 2019, MidFlorida Credit Union completed two mergers, one with Ocala, Florida based bank Community Bank & Trust and First American Bank. MidFlorida will acquire all assets of Community Bank & Trust while only acquiring the Florida Assets for First American Bank.

The merger with Community Bank & Trust was the largest bank merger with a credit union in history.

=== Prime Meridian Bank acquisition ===
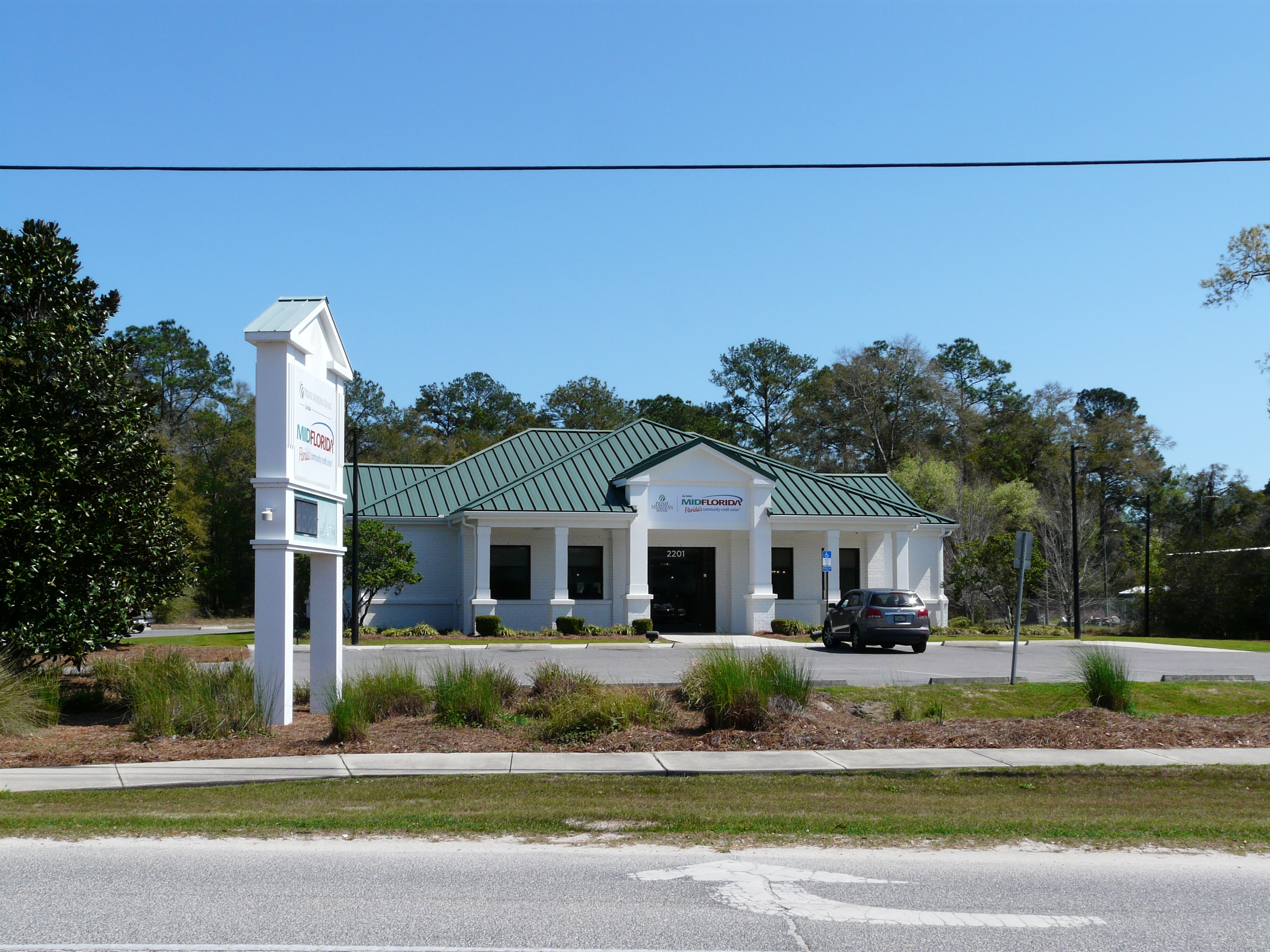
former Prime Meridian Bank in Crawfordville, Florida

In 2026 MidFlorida Credit Union completed the acquisition of Prime Meridian Bank.
