= Skymax =

Florida-based air cargo company

IATA	ICAO	Call sign
-	SMX	SKYMAX
- Commenced operations: 1997
- Hubs: Fort Lauderdale Executive Airport
- Fleet size: 4
- Headquarters: Fort Lauderdale, Florida, United States
- Website: http://www.skymax.com/

Skymax is a Florida-based air cargo company. The organization is structured into two reporting divisions: Domestic Air Cargo and International Air Cargo. It previously operated a Travel and Tours division. The Travel and Tours division organized travel in Florida and The Bahamas. Travel to and from The Bahamas was arranged through its air charter broker division. The Domestic division currently operates as an air cargo service throughout Florida. In late 2020, the company added The Caribbean to its Operating Specifications to open the Caribbean cargo and air freight market. The company is based at Fort Lauderdale Executive Airport in Fort Lauderdale, Florida, United States.

== History ==
The company was established in 1997 and initially provided professional pilot services for private aircraft owners. FAA and DOT certification as an air carrier was received in November 2013. The company operated Cessna, Beechcraft and Piper Aircraft.

== Fleet ==
In September 2021, the Skymax fleet consisted of the following aircraft:

- 1 Cessna C177RG Cardinal
- 1 Piper Navajo
- 2 Beechcraft Baron
