= Virtual maintenance training =

Training using interactive 3D simulations

Virtual Maintenance Training (VMT) is a training method that utilizes 3D simulations of real-life vehicles or equipment to train users without direct access to that equipment. It is designed to teach users the procedures for repairing and maintaining equipment effectively. VMT has civil, military, and aviation applications. This approach is used in environments where real-life training may be hazardous or impractical. VMT has been adopted by some training schools and centers, including those within the United States Armed Forces, particularly for defense vehicle maintenance. Its application has expanded across multiple industries.

== History ==
FA-18 SAMT DiSTI Screenshot.

Virtual maintenance training emerged to address the challenges of practicing maintenance and repair procedures on hazardous or unavailable equipment. One of the earliest documented uses of virtual environments for repair and maintenance was by NASA in December 1993. During this mission, virtual environment technology was used to construct a model of the Hubble Space Telescope and its replaced or serviced components.

Another example resulted from the work completed by the American Systems Corporation and the DiSTI Corporation, an American software company. DiSTI developed the first full 3D virtual interface maintenance trainer for the U.S. Navy F/A-18C Hornet Fighter Jet, which was delivered in 2006. It was the first trainer that did not use actual hardware to train students. Titled the Simulated Aircraft Maintenance Trainer (SAMT), it features a physical cockpit simulator and a virtual F/A-18 (including a virtual cockpit) displayed either on two 61-inch touch screens or a PC. The SAMT trainer uses 3D computer graphics, allowing students to navigate and interact with a virtual environment that simulates real-world operations. Studies indicated that the SAMT trainer increased the number of students trained and reduced training expenses compared to traditional methods.

== Prevalence in Industries ==
In the airline industry, aircraft inspection and maintenance are said to be approximately 90% visual but must still be performed consistently over time. As the idea of virtual reality began to advance, maintenance training for aircraft became one of the first applications to incorporate augmented reality in task training procedures.

Virtual maintenance training programs can be seen in the military simulation and training industry, although some may not accept the idea of virtual training. However, it has been noted that a benefit of using VMT is the ability to train on the device or vehicle before the real-world counterpart. Eglin Air Force Base used this in 2012, as the 35th Fighter Wing maintainers could begin their training courses before actual F-35 aircraft was delivered.

The idea of using virtual maintenance training or virtual reality in the industrial and energy industry has been a topic of discussion in the past. This interest is due to the operations and maintenance procedures performed in high-risk environments, such as nuclear power plants or high-cost and high-yield production plants. The potential use of virtual training in this industry is motivated by the experiences realized from engineering education, and visualization of the complex environments presented in computer-aided design (CAD), a type of software that allows users to create and modify 2D and 3D models. VMT, employing a 'learn-by-doing' approach, has potential applications in the assembly process. The "learn-by-doing" approach encompasses two primary goals: gaining experience through the simulated environment and actively engaging in the training process.
