= DiSTI =

American software company

The DiSTI Corporation
- Type: Privately owned company
- Industry: Modeling and simulation, simulation and training
- Founded: 1994
- Headquarters: Orlando, Florida
- Key people: John Hayward (CEO); Joe Swinski (President); William K. Andrews (COO)
- Products: GL Studio VE Studio, VE Mentor, DiSTI Schoolhouse
- Website: www.disti.com

The DiSTI Corporation is a company that provides software tools for the development of GUI software and 3D virtual training for simulators and embedded systems.

== Company ==
DiSTI concentrates on software to aid in the creation of simulated training, prototyping, and deployment of embedded systems. Their software is often used in the development of Virtual Maintenance Training systems, desktop trainers, as well as embedded avionics, automotive, and medical devices.

Their cornerstone product is the GL Studio Toolkit, which has been implemented in the development of the embedded avionics for Scaled Composites and Virgin Galactic's commercial spacecraft: the VSS Enterprise and VMS Eve.

== History ==
DiSTI was formed by Joe Swinski, Darren Humphrey, and William (Bill) Andrews in 1994 in Orlando, Florida.

Swinski, Humphrey, and Andrews met while working together at the Institute for Simulation and Training (IST) at the University of Central Florida in Orlando, FL. At IST, Swinski, Humphrey, and Andrews were aiding in the development of simulation training classes for graduate students, but they saw an opportunity to give the simulation and training industry the same type of training.

It was under a SBIR (Small Business Innovation Research) contract, completed June 24, 2000, that DiSTI developed the GL Studio toolkit. DiSTI now makes software that helps developers create virtual training environments to teach technical, complex activities such as maintenance on airplanes, engines and power plants. DiSTI's patented software also creates human-machine interfaces such as dashboards, gauges, and control screens.

Companies use diSTI technologies worldwide, including Boeing, Lockheed Martin, Honeywell, Raytheon, Thales Group, BAE Systems, Dassault Group, among many others.

In July 2020, DiSTI Corporation reported that John Hayward had been appointed as chief executive officer by the company's board of directors.
