= ITHINK Financial Credit Union =

iTHINK Financial Credit Union
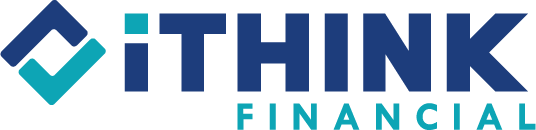
- Company type: Credit union
- Industry: Financial services
- Founded: IBM Boca Raton Employees' Federal Credit Union Boca Raton, Florida, (1969)
- Headquarters: Delray Beach, Florida, United States
- Products: Savings; checking; consumer loans; mortgages; credit cards; online banking
- Total assets: $1.5 billion USD
- Website: ithinkfi.org

iTHINK Financial (formerly known as IBMSECU) was formed in 1969 to serve the employees of IBM. iTHINK Financial is a state chartered, federally insured credit union with more than $1.5 billion in assets and more than 95,000 Members. iTHINK Financial has 22 branches located throughout Florida and Georgia and approximately 380 employees. iTHINK Financial’s headquarters are located in Delray Beach, Florida.

== History ==
iTHINK Financial was formed in 1969 by a group of IBM employees who each deposited 25 cents. On September 17, 1969, the credit union was chartered under the name IBM Boca Raton Employees' Federal Credit Union to serve IBM employees and retirees in South Florida. By year end, the credit union’s assets were $43,675.

On November 21, 1972, IBM Boca Raton EFCU expanded its field of membership throughout the state of Florida and the name was changed to IBM Florida EFCU. By the end of 1972, assets were approaching $2.5 million.

On October 31, 1977, IBM Florida EFCU expanded the field of membership again to include Alabama, Mississippi, and Puerto Rico, and became IBM Southeast Employees' Federal Credit Union. By year-end, assets had grown to almost $15 million.

Over the years, iTHINK Financial has opened its membership to include the state of Georgia and also employees of many other companies besides IBM.

On July 1, 2015, iTHINK Financial converted from a federally chartered credit union to a Florida state-chartered credit union and the name was changed to IBM Southeast Employees' Credit Union (IBMSECU).

In 2017, iTHINK Financial acquired Mackinac Savings Bank in Boynton Beach, Florida, which added three more branches in Palm Beach County, and merged it into its own infrastructure. In 2019, iTHINK Financial acquired a second Florida-based bank, Oculina Bank, which had eight branches in the state.

On March 2, 2020, the credit union rebranded to iTHINK Financial.

Today (when?), iTHINK Financial offers membership to people who work for or are retired from a member company, live in an approved county, worship or attend school in an approved county, or are immediate family members of/live in the same household as an existing member.

iTHINK Financial currently (when?) has more than $1.5 billion in assets, 22 branches, 380 employees, and more than 95,000 members across the country.

== Products and services ==
iTHINK Financial, like all credit unions, is a not-for-profit financial institution that provides a full range of products and services to its members, including checking accounts, savings accounts, money market accounts, certificates, IRAs, business accounts, health savings accounts, vehicle loans, first mortgages, second mortgages, credit cards, business loans, online banking, online bill paying, mobile banking, e-statements, business services, insurance, and investment services.

As a not-for-profit organization, iTHINK Financial's "profits" are returned to its members in the form of lower fees, better loan rates, and higher dividends than those of other financial institutions.

== Safety ==
iTHINK Financial is insured by the National Credit Union Administration (NCUA) and is an equal housing lender. Savings at iTHINK Financial are insured to at least $250,000.
