= Lynx Air International =

Airline from the United States

IATA	ICAO	Call sign
-	LXF	LYNX FLIGHT
- Founded: 1989; 37 years ago
- Ceased operations: 2009; 17 years ago
- Hubs: Fort Lauderdale-Hollywood International Airport
- Fleet size: 0
- Headquarters: Fort Lauderdale, Florida, USA

Lynx Air International was a United States airline based in Fort Lauderdale, Florida, USA.

== History ==
The airline was established by C.A. Southerland and Steve Adams in 1989 as the first commercial airline offering direct service from the US to Cap-Haïtien, on the north coast of Haiti. Lynx Air International had at its peak 117 full-time employees in five countries (April 2008), and operated scheduled service to 7 destinations in the Bahamas, as well as Cap-Haïtien, Haiti and Guantanamo Bay, Cuba. Lynx also served Jamaica, the Turks and Caicos Islands, and the Dominican Republic, from both Fort Lauderdale and Miami International Airports.

Lynx was initially certified by the FAA as a Part 135 airline, and then achieved Part 121 certification in May 1997. Lynx suspended airline operations in July 2009, just over 20 years from the date of its first flight, May 5, 1989.

== Destinations ==
Lynx Air International offered scheduled flights to several destinations in the Caribbean including Haiti, Guantanamo Bay Cuba, the Dominican Republic, Jamaica and the Bahamas.

During February 2006 Lynx Air International undertook a major expansion, adding more flights to the Out Islands of the Bahamas from Fort Lauderdale, including three additional islands, South Andros, (Congotown), Abaco, and North Eleuthera. In 2007 Lynx Air International ceased service to Treasure Cay, Abacos Treasure Cay Airport.

The various Bahamian islands that Lynx served over the years of its existence were:

South Andros/Congotown - Andros Island Andros Town/Fresh Creek - Andros Island San Andros - Andros Island

South Bimini - Bimini

North Eleuthera - Eleuthera Governour's Harbour - Eleuthera

Georgetown - Exuma

New Bight - Cat Island

Lynx was the only direct air service from the US to Congo Town and San Andros.

During the entire time of its existence Lynx provided the only continuously operating direct air service from the US to Cap-Haïtien, and dominated the market, operating numerous flights to and from both Fort Lauderdale and Miami. Lynx also offered direct scheduled service between Fort Lauderdale, Florida and the US Naval Base at Guantanamo Bay, Cuba, serving the numerous contractors that lived and worked there on behalf of the US government.

In addition to passenger service, Lynx had a strong express freight and private (subscription) mail service, mainly to the residents of Cap-Haïtien, Haiti and gave credit for its many years of success to having diverse revenue streams, not depending solely on passenger traffic for its existence. The Metro turboprop aircraft that Lynx initially operated were capable of reconfiguring in a "Combi" configuration and many times Lynx would utilize the aircraft in a cargo or combi configuration for one leg of a flight, then reinstall passenger seating for the return leg, maximizing utilization and revenue.

== Fleet ==
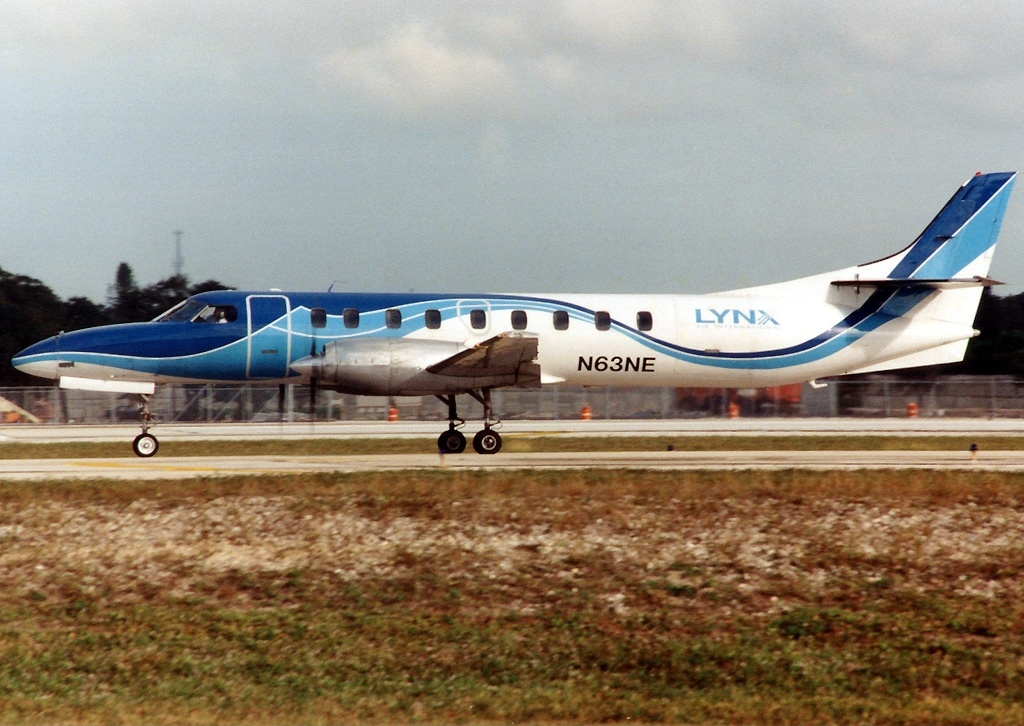
Lynx Air International Swearingen Merlin

During its existence, and after a merger with Florida Coastal Airlines that took place in 2008, Lynx Air operated a variety of aircraft, including Cessna 402's, DC-3, Piper Aztec, and Metro III and Saab 340 turboprops.

=== Historical fleet ===
Lynx Air International previously operated the following aircraft:

- 7 Fairchild Swearingen Metroliner
- 4 Saab 340

== See also ==
- List of defunct airlines of the United States
