= A21, Inc. =

Stock photography company

a21, Inc.
- Company type: Public
- Industry: Stock photography
- Founded: San Francisco, California USA (2000)
- Headquarters: Jacksonville, Florida, USA
- Key people: John Ferguson, CEO; Bruce D. Slywka, Executive Vice President of Sales and Marketing

A21, Inc. (stylized as a21) was a licenser and distributor of digital images.

== Services ==
a21 aggregated visual content from photographers, photography agencies, archives, libraries, and private collections, and licensed that content for its customers. Those included advertising and design agencies, publishing and media companies, in-house communication departments and outside corporate communications firms, small and home office businesses, and the general public. a21 sold its services directly and through a global network of 150 distributors in over 100 countries, and through print advertising, direct mail, Web mail, and telemarketing.

== History ==
Formed as an investment company in 2000, a21 acquired the stock photography agency SuperStock in 2004. They moved into SuperStock's headquarters in Jacksonville, Florida, and used SuperStock as a vehicle for further expansion. In 2005 a21 acquired Ingram Publishing Ltd., a UK-based provider of subscription and royalty-free images. as well as vector graphics and fonts, vehicle outline templates, and print price guides. The following year they acquired ArtSelect, an Iowa-based provider of online technology and fulfillment infrastructure for retailers in the custom framed art and wall décor market.

== Timeline ==
In 2007, it formed an agreement with the image search engine company Pixsy.

In late 2007 the company announced plans to launch a new royalty-free-only brand named MediaMagnet. However, this brand was not successful, and MediaMagnet images became available for sale only through SuperStock.

In 2008, Sears announced that it would use ArtSelect to allow shoppers to order art and custom frames online.

By the end of 2008, a21 had declared bankruptcy under Chapter 11. Its $4.5 million in assets were auctioned off in January 2009 and the company was liquidated.

== Executives ==
- John Z. Ferguson, Chief Executive Officer
- LaDuane Clifton, Chief Financial Officer
