= Sedano's =

Supermarket chain

Sedano's Supermarkets
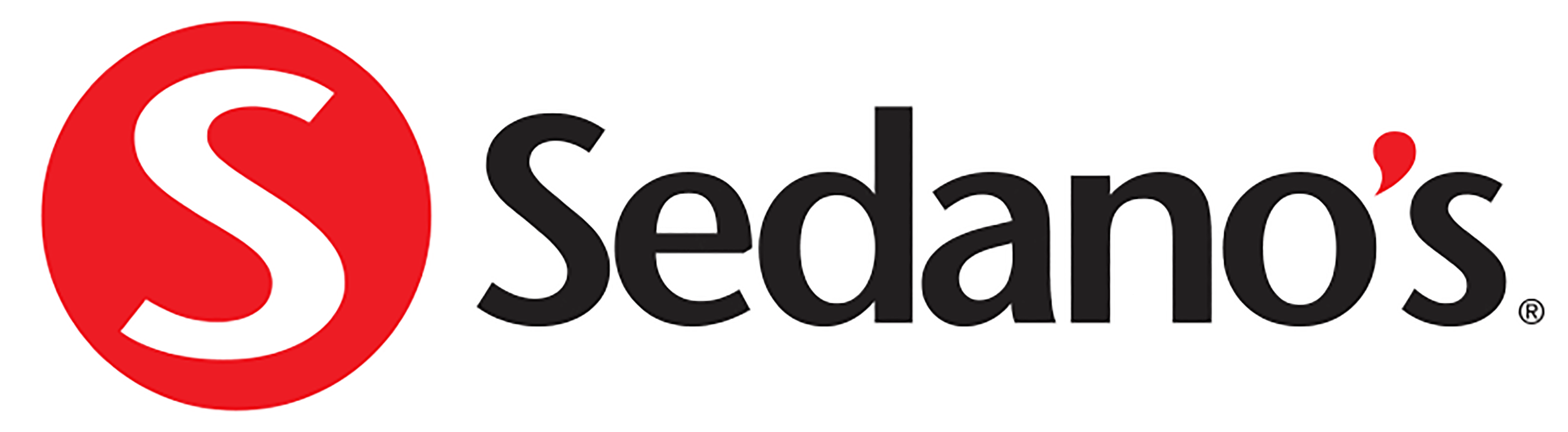
- Type: Private
- Industry: Retail
- Founded: 1961; 65 years ago in Hialeah, Florida
- Founder: Rene Sedano
- Headquarters: Miami, Florida
- Number of locations: >35
- Area served: Florida
- Key people: Agustin Herrán (CEO & President)

Sedano's Supermarkets is the United States’ largest Hispanic retailer and largest Hispanic-owned supermarket chain. With headquarters in Miami-Dade County, Sedano's employs approximately 3,000 associates and operates 35 stores across Florida in Miami-Dade, Broward, Orange, and Osceola counties. Sedano's is also the largest member of Associated Grocers of Florida, a wholesale grocery food cooperative. In 2020, Sedano's Supermarkets was named Food and Wine’s 20 Best Regional Supermarket Chains of All Time.

== History ==
=== Early history ===
In 1961, Cuban exile René Sedano opened the original Sedano’s store, a 4,000-square-foot (370 m2) bodega, in Hialeah, Florida. In 1962, a fellow Cuban exile, Armando Guerra Sr., acquired the store from Sedano and kept the name. After the Castro revolution, which culminated in 1959, Guerra, a successful banker and grocer in Cuba, exiled to Miami in 1961. In 1971, he encouraged Manuel “Manolo” Herrán, who had married Guerra's niece, to move to Miami from Atlanta, Georgia, and assist with Sedano's operations. Herrán, a native of Spain, had moved to Sancti Spíritus, Cuba, as a teenager with his parents and siblings to escape Franco's regime. In 1967, at the age of 28, he fled Cuba and communism with his wife Nyria and their young family. They first landed in Atlanta. Upon moving to Miami, the Guerra and Herrán families began working together to grow the supermarket business.

Armando Guerra Sr. died in 1979. At that time, Manuel Herrán assumed control of the company and continued expanding the chain. He subsequently lured his brothers José, Ezequiel, and Antolín to join him in running the operation.

=== Management today ===
In 2005, Manuel Herrán's son, Agustin Herrán, became president and CEO of Sedano's, and Manuel served as chairman of the board until his death on October 15, 2020. The management team includes José Herrán Jr., who serves as chief operating officer, and Javier Herrán as chief marketing officer.

=== Market ===
Sedano's has onsite bakeries and kitchens that produce Hispanic baked goods such as Cuban bread, empanadas, croquetas, and pastelitos. Its custom-cuts meat department with an onsite butcher or “carnicero,” fish and seafood selection, prepared Latin meals, and onsite café specializing in cafeticos, attract Hispanic and non-Hispanic shoppers alike.

Besides packaged Hispanic foods and culturally common fresh fruits and vegetables, shoppers can also find typical American fare and products.

=== Florida expansion ===
In 1994, Sedano's began expanding beyond Miami-Dade County when it opened its first store in Hollywood in Broward County. There are currently four locations in Broward, including Pembroke Pines and North Lauderdale. In January 2010, three Sedano's were opened in Central Florida after acquiring stores from Albertsons LLC. Two are in Orlando and the third location is in Kissimmee.

The chain has since grown to include stores spanning Miami-Dade, Broward, Orange, and Osceola counties. On November 6, 2019, the 35th location opened in Hialeah, making this the 10th store in Sedano's Supermarkets founding city of Hialeah, the sixth-largest city in the state.

=== Sedano’s Private Label ===
In 2007, Sedano's Supermarkets launched its private label of products, which spans over 1,000 items as of 2021.

=== Online shopping, curbside pickup, and delivery service ===
In 2018, Sedano's Supermarkets announced a partnership with Takeoff Technologies, a grocery software startup, to debut the first-ever automated, hyperlocal fulfillment center in Miami. This first-of-its-kind automated storage and retrieval system, built by Austrian logistics company KNAPP and designed by Takeoff, allowed Sedano's to expand into the grocery automation space. The robotic store can prepare over 1,500 items per hour, completing a 60-item order in 5 minutes. Shoppers who don't have the time or ability to shop in person can shop for groceries online at sedanos.com. Employees then bag the robotically retrieved groceries and load them into Sedano's trucks, and the groceries are delivered to select stores for pickup. Customers call upon arrival, and their groceries are carried out and placed in their vehicle. In February 2019, curbside pickup became available at even more stores.

=== Shipt ===
To further expand its online ordering and delivery options, Sedano's announced its partnership with Shipt in May 2020. Sedano's customers can order groceries, including fresh produce, meats, deli items, and daily essentials, as well as beer and wine, choose a delivery window time, and have the items delivered to their door.

=== Sedano’s Pharmacy ===
In 1977, Sedano's Pharmacy was launched; Armando Guerra Jr., son of Armando Guerra Sr., was named president of Sedano's Pharmacy, having earned his degree in pharmacy at the University of Florida. Over the next three decades, Sedano's Pharmacy became a Hispanic drug retailer company with 11 locations from Homestead to Kissimmee, Florida.

In 2007, Navarro Discount Pharmacies, today part of CVS Health, acquired Sedano's Pharmacy for an undisclosed amount. The deal only included their 11 freestanding pharmacy locations, not the supermarkets. This acquisition allowed Sedano's to focus solely on its core grocery business.

=== Sedano’s Brand ===
In 2008, Sedano's hired República as its marketing, media and communications agency of record. Today renamed Republica Havas, the agency has worked with the Herrán family to evolve and grow the storied Sedano's brand across Florida. In 2020, República Havas led the development of the partnership between Sedano's, Versailles and La Carreta restaurants to help save hundreds of employees’ jobs due to the lockdowns across Florida because of the COVID-19 pandemic. The effort has won several awards, including a Gold ADDY Award from the American Advertising Federation.

=== Hurricane Efforts ===
During hurricane season, customers can find a complimentary Hurricane Preparation Guide online and at each location. In preparation for hurricane season, Sedano's works with Florida Power & Light Company (FPL) and the Community Coalition, Inc., to voluntarily pack hurricane food kits for homebound senior citizens in Miami-Dade County. These hurricane food kits include non-perishable food items and water, along with a hurricane preparedness guide. In the aftermath of a hurricane, each store is equipped with emergency generators to accelerate reopening. The management works in conjunction with local and national organizations to provide relief in monetary donations, non-perishable goods, clothing, first-aid kits, and other needed supplies.

=== COVID-19 ===
As an “essential” business since the onset of the COVID-19 pandemic, Sedano's adjusted operations and policies as required by the Centers for Disease Control and Prevention (CDC), and local protocols. In addition to reinforcing heightened cleaning and sanitation procedures across all stores as needed, Sedano's provided safety gear, such as masks and gloves, to employees to help ensure their safety while at work. Customers are required to wear face coverings before entering and while shopping. Additional safety precautions were adopted, including providing hand sanitizer, plexiglass barriers at check-out stations, and limiting capacity as necessary. The 7:00am to 8:00am hour was also dedicated to customers 65 years of age or older and the community's immunocompromised members.
