= Tropical Financial Credit Union =

- Type: Credit Union
- Industry: Financial services
- Founded: 1935
- Headquarters: Miramar, Florida, United States
- Area served: Broward, Miami-Dade, Palm Beach, and Sarasota Counties, FL
- Products: Savings; Checking; Consumer loans; Mortgages; Credit cards; Investments
- Website: TropicalFCU.com

Tropical Financial Credit Union (TCFU) is a member-owned credit union that was chartered in 1935 and is headquartered in Miramar, Florida. TFCU is regulated under the authority of the National Credit Union Administration (NCUA).

== History ==
Southern Bell (later renamed BellSouth and now AT&T) organized the credit union in March 1935 with over $800 in deposits and over $400 in loans by the end of the second day. The credit union was chartered under the Farm Credit Administration and was called the Miami Bell System Employees Federal Credit Union. The first board of directors' meeting authorized the purchase of a cash box and rubber stamps, not to cost more than $1.20 and $1.60 respectively. During that first year, the first part-time employee was hired at $.30 an hour. By the end of the year, assets had grown to $11,775.

In 1939, the name was changed to Tropical Telco Federal Credit Union. The following year saw the credit union's assets grow to $100,000. By 1947, assets had grown to $400,000. Katie Vachon became general manager in 1956 when assets reached $2 million. The next year, Vachon joined the credit union's board of directors. In 1957, assets grew to $2.5 million and Tropical Telco moved into a new building on Giralda Avenue in Coral Gables and formed a Credit Union Booster Club.

By 1965, assets had reached over $5 million. During this period, the office was closed one day so employees could calculate and pay 5½% dividend to the share accounts. In 1968, assets of the credit union reached $10 million.

During the 1970s, Tropical Telco Credit Union's assets reached $54 million. In the mid-seventies, Tropical Telco began its trend to become a full service financial institution by expanding its services from share accounts (savings accounts) to share drafts (checking accounts), VISA cards and ATM services. In 1978, the growth resulted in assets of $50 million. By 1979, Tropical Telco had evolved to practically a full-service financial institution.

Tropical Telco saw tremendous growth in the early 1980s. It was also a decade of major events affecting Tropical Telco's future as no other previous event. Divestiture of the Bell System, which reduced its work force to cut costs, also reduced Tropical Telco's growth in membership. Interstate banking was permitted by the State of Florida, which increased competition among all financial institutions for members' deposits and loans. On August 1, 1987, President Greg Blount joined the credit union. In 1989, Tropical Telco's board of directors approved the expansion of the field of membership to the first select employee group (SEG) outside of the core "Bell System" employee groups served.

By the 1990s, Tropical Telco's staff had grown to over 260. The credit union had 10 locations, over 80,000 members, and approximately $400 million in assets. In 1995, Tropical Telco Federal Credit Union celebrated its 60th anniversary and changed its name to Tropical Federal Credit Union. The credit union continued to add SEGs, which today (when?) total more than 200 member companies.

In July 2001, Tropical Federal Credit Union converted from a federally chartered to a state-chartered credit union. As part of this charter conversion, the credit union changed its name to Tropical Financial Credit Union. The state charter provided further expansion opportunities to include defined communities, as well as continued SEG growth.

TFCU assets exceeded $700 Million in 2007.

== Services ==
Tropical Financial offers banking services such as free and high-yield checking accounts, high interest savings accounts, low rates on loans, retirement planning, debt consolidation and refinancing, small business services and free financial seminars.

== Awards ==
Tropical Financial Credit Union was awarded a 4-star rating with Bauer Financial Inc. as well as the Governor's Florida Sterling Award in 2005.
