= Achieva Credit Union =

State chartered credit union in the United States

- Formerly: Pinellas County Teachers Credit Union (1937-2004)
- Type: Credit Union
- Industry: Financial services
- Predecessor: Sarasota Coastal Credit Union
- Founded: 1937; 89 years ago
- Headquarters: Dunedin, Florida, United States
- Area served: Broward, Charlotte, Citrus, Collier, DeSoto, Glades, Hardee, Hendry, Hernando, Highlands, Hillsborough, Lee, Manatee, Miami-Dade, Monroe, Okeechobee, Palm Beach, Pasco, Pinellas, Polk, Sarasota, and Sumter Counties, FL
- Key people: Eric Jenkins, CEO/President
- Products: Savings; Checking; Consumer loans; Mortgages; Credit cards; Investments
- Website: www.achievacu.com

Achieva Credit Union, is a state chartered credit union in the United States of America, regulated under the authority of the National Credit Union Administration (NCUA). On November 1, 2009, Sarasota Coastal Credit Union merged with Achieva Credit Union, which is headquartered in Dunedin, Florida. The credit union is expected to hit $3 billion in assets and has more than 214,000 members. The credit union serves 22 counties across 26 branches.

== History ==
In 1937, the credit union started as the Pinellas County Teachers Credit Union, a credit union for seven teachers in Pinellas County, starting with only $99.25. In 2004, the Pinellas County Teachers Credit Union officially changed its name to its current name, Achieva Credit Union, to better reflect its expansion outside of Pinellas County.

On November 1, 2009, Achieva Credit Union merged with Sarasota Coastal Credit union, merging Achieva's $650 million in assets with Sarasota Coastal's $235 million in assets, totaling $885 million in assets, as well as over 90,000 members. The merge was because Sarasota Costal faced high financial stress after the 2008 financial crisis. Troubled with this, they looked for a stable partner to merge with, with a vast majority of its members agreeing to the merge.

In 2015, Achieva Credit Union acquired with Calusa Bank in Sarasota and Charlotte counties, which brought four more branches and $165 million in assets. Later in 2018, Achieva acquired another bank, Preferred Community Bank in Lee County, bringing 3 more branches and another $118 million in assets.

In 2024, Achieva Credit Union acquired Veritas Title, a realestate title and closing company, and rebranded and launched it as Achieva Title Services. This acquisition was meant to diversify what Achieva offers past regular banking.

In 2025, Achieva Credit Union started a partnership with Angeline Academy of Innovation, where each summer, Angeline Academy selects 4-6 students to attempt the Certified Credit Union Financial Counselor (CCUFC) certification and spend their summer working at Achieva locations in Pasco County, Florida.

== Membership ==
Eligibility for Achieva Credit Union membership is open to anyone who is related to a current Achieva member; or individuals, trusts, associations, organizations and legal entities who live or work in Broward, Charlotte, Citrus, Collier, DeSoto, Glades, Hardee, Hendry, Hernando, Highlands, Hillsborough, Lee, Manatee, Miami-Dade, Monroe, Okeechobee, Palm Beach, Pasco, Polk, Pinellas, Sarasota, and Sumter. There are 26 branches across their service region.

== Organization ==
Achieva Credit Union is governed by a volunteer Board of Directors, elected by and from its membership. The Board has nine members, who serve for three-year terms. Board members can be re-elected to consecutive terms by the membership.

The credit union is a member of the Florida Credit Union League, through which it is associated with the Credit Union National Association.

== Services ==
Achieva Credit Union offers savings accounts, checking accounts, IRA accounts, and certificates of deposit, as well as consumer loans, credit cards, mortgages, home equity loans and HELOCs.
