= List of villages in Oyo State =

List of Villages

This is a list of villages and settlements in Oyo State, Nigeria organised by local government area (LGA) and district/area (with postal codes also given).

== By postal code ==
LGA	District / area	Postal code	Villages
Afijio	Akinmorin / Jobele	211102	Aba Ibadan; Aba Kasia; Akinmorin; Alapadi; Anfelerin; Bali; Basi; Ekewa; Eleko; Elepe; Elesu; Elewebe; Fadare; Idiito; Ijefon; Ile Olufi; Imeleke; Iseke; Jagun; Jobele; Jokan; Kolobo; Lanipekun; Lapiti; Oke; Olokiti; Oniyanrin; Sulu
Afijio	Awe	211106	Aba Bara; Aba Ogunremi; Aba Olori; Aiyekale; Ajegunle; Apaara; Asipa; Awe; Emiabata; Idi Agbon; Idi Orpa; Idimangoro; Ijado; Isale Apata; Jabata; Kiyesemi; Kosobo; Laraniyi; Moromipin; Olukolu; Oluode; Onfunfun
Afijio	Fiditi	211104	Adekunfe; Agbaakin; Bello; Dakeja; Egbejoda; Fiditi; Idowu Oko; Ijaiye Ojutaye; Irepodun Village; Modeni
Afijio	Ilora/Oluwa-Tedo	211105	Abeodo; Aburumaku; Agbonrin; Ago Fulani; Agunbiade; Ajuwon; Akee; Akesapon; Akinpelu; Akodudu; Akuo; Alapinni; Alawusa; Anti; Aribambo; Aridiogo; Arin; Eleekara; Eleyele; Fadari; Ilora; Obananko; Obanlete; Ogunwemimo; Ojutaye; Olorieru; Olukosolu; Olukotun; Oluwatedo; Onikoko; Oniluru; Sakutu; Temidire Farm Sett.
Afijio	Imini	211107	Agoyo; Ajana; Ajobo; Arulogun; Atan; Atente; Hosi; Ilu Aje; Imini; Isioye; Japeta; Lakanpa; Ojerinde; Okelagun; Olounde; Olowa; Waya
Afijio	Iware	211103	Aba Jagun; Ajayi; Akinola; Iware; Labe; Molade; Ogunkanmi; Ojerinde; Sekeseke
Akinyele	Ajibade / Alabata	200135	Agbedo; Ajibade; Akingbala; Alabata; Alagbaa; Balogun; Dabadango; Elekuru; Lakeye; Olode; Olorisa; Onibon-Nla
Akinyele	Akinyele	200136	Agbirigidi; Ajobo; Akingbala; Akinjero 1 & II; Akinyele; Alagbaa; Babalawo; Iba; Irepodun; Isabiyi; Solalu
Akinyele	Arulogun / Igbo OLoyin /	200134	Adebayo; Agbongun; Ajobo; Akinaje; Akinode; Aroro; Arulogun; Atere; Balogun; Eniosa; Igboloyin; Ogunranti; Olanla; Oluwo; Salako
Akinyele	Ijaye	200137	Agbonrin; Ajibode; Atan Ojedele; Atan-Nla; Bamidele; Fagbenro; Fagunwa; Idi-Aayan; Ijaye Ajeja; Iware; Lalare; Odunewu; Ojedeji; Olonitutu; Saanu; Sangobon; Tola larumo
Akinyele	Ikereku	200139	Agbagi; Alade; Alasoosun; Atapa; Ayepola; Ekefa; Eleepo; Ogbogbologun; Folarin; Oloya; Agoro-Ibadan; Faleye; Idiapa; Ikereku; Ileyioku; Labode; Morowonaa; Obada; Ogbongan; Ogunjinmi; Ogunjinmi Egan; Olanla; Olunlosin; Onikarahun; Osayindeyi; Oyada
Akinyele	Iroko	200140	Akinwumi; Arikanki; Fakore; Igbagbo; Iroko; Motunde; Olowogbo; Onisigun; Oretu; Taiwo
Akinyele	Moniya	200132	Adeosun; Ajibode; Akobo; Apapa; Ògo; Dabiri; Idi Ose; Idi-Iroko; Kajorepo; Kakun; Lanibe; Mokankan; Moniya; Alade; Odogbo; Ojoo; Okeona; Olomo; Olugbode; Onilabu; Orogun; Oyatola; Sada; Sasa
Akinyele	Olode / Onidundu	200138	Abatan; Adeogun; Adifa; Amosun; Asania; Idi Ori; Ileba; Ojerinde; Olode; Onidundu; Onigbongbo; Salako; Togiri; Aba Osa; Talotan; Ayun; Sokinloju; Ojotegiri;Ayunhun; Apapa Odan; Iya Ofa;Baba Mogba; Akande; Idi Oro; Ogungbe; Eke Ola; Onikange; Bantuu; Paade; Olanla; Obodaa; Asipa
Akinyele	Olorisakoko/Mele	200133	Anisere; Asani; Ejitolu; Elewintan; Folarin; Idi-Odan; Mele; Molarere; Okegbemi; Olorisaoko; Oyodo
Atiba	Atiba	211108	Aaatan; Abolupe; Afonja; Agbaa; Agbaakin; Agbaka; Agbalowo-Asa; Agberinde; Agunpopo; Ajalaruru; Ajegunle; Ajikobi; Akaparo; Akinku; Alaafin Palace; Alubata; Alusekere; Are-Eromasanyin; Aremo Area; Asanminu; Ashamu; Ashipa; Ayetoro; Baago; Balogun Maje; Bangudu; Basorun; Ekesan; Eleke; Elerinle; Elewi; Gaa Bale Fulani; Gbangba Taylor; Gbanta; Ijawaya; Ikolaba; Ile-Ewe; Ilowagbade; Ilusinmi; Iyalamu; Jowo Ese; Keeto; Koloko; Koso; Lagbondoko Area; Latula; Obagbori; Ode Moje; Ofa-Meta; Ogbegbe; Oke Oloola Area; Oke-Afin Area; Olokun Esin; Olugbile; Ona-Aka; Onireko; Onre Bare; Oota; Oridota; Origbemidele; Orokoroko; Otefon; Saakin; Saamu; Sabo; Sangolokeke; Sarumi; St. Andrews Area; Tak
Atisbo	Ago-Are/ Owo	203105	Ago Are; Agunrege; Alaga; Bashi Owo; Corner Owo; Ito; Sabe
Atisbo	Aha/Tede	203104	Aha; Tede
Atisbo	Irawo / Ofiki	203106	Irawo; Irawo Ile; Irawotedo; Kajewole; Ofiki; Owode
Egbeda	Ayede /Alugbo	200114	Adeyadi; Alagbo; Ayede; Buramo; Fatade; Fayo; Koloko
Egbeda	Egbeda	200109	Abepe; Adegbayi; Adekola; Adelabu; Adogba; Agbowo Village; Agoro; Ajia; Ajule-Alagbaa; Alakia; Alarere; Alarobo; Apete; Apoku; Arolu; Asaju; Ayepe; Bole Village; Egbalekan; Egbeda; Idi-Mango; Jagun; Koroboto; Lamuregun; Mapo-Egbeda; Molade Ayedaade; Mosafejo; New Gbagi; Nigeria Breweries; Olo; Olodi; Olopo Metta; Olorisaoko; Olowo; Oloya; Olubadan Estate; Olugbojo; Onipepeye; Onisade; Oremeji; Reji Sekere; Sawmill; Tanmo
Egbeda	Erunmu	200113	Adeleye; Arije; Afinti; Ajia; Ajiwogbo; Akinlomo; Aloba; Ataari; Gberinmi; Jooda; Kolayan; Moje; Olodan; Olokeke; Oloro; Olosun; Onibata; Pagun; Solowojaiye
Egbeda	Olodo / Kumapayi	200111	Aba Igbo; Ajo; Akinluwo; Akorede; Aloko; Egbe; Elesan; Gbenku; Idi Osan; Jeriyin; Koloko; Kumapayi; Maje; Odan; Ogaala; Ogan-Ango; Ojujinle; Ojuolape; Oki; Oko; Oko-Omi; Olodo; Olukunle; Wakajaiye; Wofun
Egbeda	Osegere	200110	Awaye; Awowo; Erinmi; Idogo; Ilaro I & II; Olumakun; Osegere
Egbeda	Owobaale / Kasumu	200112	Alagbede; Alaikola; Apaso; Apoku; Efunwole; Gidigidi; Ibiti; Kasumu; Odode; Ore I; Ore II; Owebaale; Yati
Ibarapa Central	Idere	201104	Abolanle; Adeagbo; Ajumobi
Ibarapa Central	Igbo-Ora	201103	Akeroro; Alabi; Alagba; Araromi; Arigbeyo; Asipa; Fidegbo; Geke; Igboleke; Igboora; Jato; Sekere
Ibarapa East	Eruwa	201101	Abule Oba; Abule Okie; Abule-Osun; Aderohunmui; Afuye; Agboti; Ago-Ajaala; Aiyegbede; Alagbena; Ameke; Atanke; Ayeno; Baba Oke; Baba-Elenutipala; Bamigbose; Dagilegbo; Dagiloro; Dawodu; Dudoyemi; Elepo; Elukotun; Eruwa; Gboru; Ilo Ogundele; Isaba Temidire; Iseyin Villages; Jagala; Jankata; Language; Lawore; Obadelu Hill; Ogundele; Okolo; Olokenoji; Olori; Olorunda; Oluwo; Panu; Sango; Sango Odo; Sangote; Sobaloju; Sunmirire; Temidire-Idiope
Ibarapa East	Lanlate	201102	Alapa; Igbodudu; Itabo; Ilado; Elegun; Are-Ago; Owode; Eran; Aborisade; Sikiti; Panlati; Opoogede; Asako; Maya; Osoogun; Egboolasa; Gaadi; Igbodudu; Salako; Aboya; Akeete; Lagaye; Adegbola; Ojonamo; Atunwa; Owaka; Aga; Oba; Alaye; Abule One; Baba Magbe; Age; Majengbasan; Lala; Idowu Abidiosa; Abule Ige; Abidiosa; Jagun; Onibenbe; Adeyemi; Temidire; Janata; Jaleagbon; Akinwunmi; Abaapa; Araromi; Goke Saangi; Danenu; Ebinpejo; Filakaka; Igbolaja; Lanlate
Ibarapa North	Ayete	201105	AgunOjekunle; Aiyete; Ajelanwa; Akowe; Alagbaa; Alapala; Apagbo; Elewure; Gbodiko; Gboko; Iki; KajolaKajola Shipa; Oba; Ojekinde; Okugba; Onipede; Opomu; Tobalogun; Ture Origi
Ibarapa North	Igangan	201007	Ajegunle; Akoya; Asunnara; Egbe Omo; Elegbeda; Idiope; Igangan; Olokete; Owode
Ibarapa North	Tapa	201106	Adeagbo; Ahoro; Ajegunle; Ajelanwa; Alaparun; Gbelckale; Itumeta; Kongo; Oyee; Tapa
Irepo	Kishi	212101	Aawe; Abanla Agunla; Adagbangba; Agunbebe; Aiyekale; Ajanaa; Ajetowa; Alagbon; Alegongo; Amuda Aro; Apata; Arogbe; Atipa; Ayifo; Ayola; Baale Ajila; Baba Ilorin; Barunganma; Budo Ibadan; Budo Abu; Budo Ago; Budo Aifo; Budo Diedie; Budo Fatowa; Budo Gesi; Budo Ibariba; Budo Ido Akun; Budo Igboho; Budo Iseyi; Budo Jagun; Budo Kilani; Budo Moradesa; Budo Mujemi; Budo Mushi; Budo Nla; Budo Sabi; Budo Sule; Budo Suru; Budo Woru; Elerin; Gaa Adu; Gaa Apata; Gaa Asapa; Gaa Baale; Gaa Gudu; Gaa Idi; Gaa Kumosa; Gaa Momodu; Gaa Sanni; Gaa Tunku; Gaa Umoru; Iba; Ibudo Adeigba; Ibudo Ado; Igbo Elemi; Igboroko; Iyayoyin; Joore; Kishi Township; Kumbi; Laha; Odo Igbo; Ojetete; Ojo Aro; Oko Oba; Olokoto; Onipako; Oniyo; Osalakin; Sangoleye; Seibu; Sise Olowo; Tesi; Tesi-Idi Ero; Wole Wole; Yakubu; Yerepe
Iseyin	Ado-Awaye	202102	Aagba; Aba Nla; Aba Tapa; Abapan; Abidioki; Aboriso; Abule Nla.; Abule Oloola; Adeagbo; Adegbola; Adekola; Adeniji; Ado; Ajagbeegun; Akoda; Aladere; Aladura; Alagbede; Amolegbe; Anko; Atapa; Atunwa; Aweye; Awolese; Ayanbule; Baba Sango; Balogun; Egbebi; Elekule; Elewele; Elewuro; Eleyele; Esinjowo; Ewetunde; Ireso; Iserin; Joloko; Maya Oke; Oba; Obanase; Odo Ogun; Ogbigbi; Olose Onike; Olukela; Onire; Samson; Tabiti; Wasinmi
Iseyin	Iseyin	202101	Aaba Titun; Aba Ibadan; Aba Sule; Abugaga; Abule Odo; Adewuyi; Adodo; Afonja; Ajagbadi.; Ajofin; Ajokete; Akan; Alagbede; Alayan; Alayin; Aleshinloye; Apata; Apata Olodo; Apenpe; Asba Titun; Asesu; Asheru; Baba Isale; Balelayo; Dokun; Gboro; Idi Emi; Idi Igba; Igbo Oloro; Igbokandi; Igbomara; Igboro; Igunrin; Ikere; Iseyin Township; Itagbe; Kajola; Lokodu; Odoomu; Odooto; Ogungbe; Oke Edu; Okese; Olode; Olode Olokosuru; Olofin; Olokolo; Olokosun; Olugbade; Orita Merin; Osantu; Otiri Alagbado; Pago
Iseyin	Osogun	202103	Aba Agba; Aba Paanu; Adebisi; Adekola; Afoyasoro; Agelu; Ago Olosun; Ahiyangan; Ajiyo; Akinlabi; Akinwumi; Akiti Ponpo; Alapako; Alaro; Alawure; Apapasana; Araromi; Ayantade; Budo Agba; Dananu; Daripapa; Epipi; Fidayi Papa; Goke Sago; Igbodudu; Jagun Sagbo; Maya; Odo Ogba; Ogbo Ilasa; Ogboolasa; Ogodu I; Ogodu II; Ogundipe; Oguntunji; Olohunde; Oloje; Olose; Onikaninkanin; Osogun; Owonitola; Sagbo Ile; Salami; Sekelade; Temidire
Itesiwaju	Ipapo/Oke Amu	202104	Abugaga; Alagbede; Amuda Egunsola; Ariyo; Aroje; Ayodele; Baba Sango; Balelayo; Elekuku; Hagbe; Igboro; Ipapo; Isemi; Kasia; Oke Amu; Okebi; Okose; Onisau; Owode; Panla
Itesiwaju	Komu / Igbojaye	202106	Aba Ogbomoso; Adenle; Adeta; Agba; Agbaruru; Ago Fulani; Ajibija; Akinsapon; Amaja; Amosun; Apo Wuku; Arigidana Isale; Arigidana Oke; Arikuyeri; Asaja; Baba Ode; Bale Agbe; Ehito; Gelede; Igbojaye; Ijasan; Ilaji; Kajola; Komu; Kujifi; Monmon; Ogodu; Ojurepepe; Olekete; Olukotun; Olunlade; Omopupa; Orisunbare; Oroki
Itesiwaju	Temidire Layout	202105	Aba Paha; Abidogun; Ahere; Alaga; Apa Funwonleta; Arogede; Asaju Onileku; Egbedoyin; Okaka; Onijokun; Suberu
Iwajowa	Aiyegun	202112	Aiyegun; Border Area; Oha Village; Wasinmi
Iwajowa	Idiko Ago / Itasa / Ayetoroile	202114	Aba Akinsapon; Aba Ayetoro-Ile; Aba Ifo Ere; Aba Obelu; Aba Oko Aje; Aba Oloje; Agbeji Village; Alapa Village; Asefisun Village I; Asefisun village II; Ayetoro Ile; Dauda Village; Ehinke; Gaa Arole; Gaa Arubiewe; Gaa Atiku; Gaa Saliu; Gbedu Village; Idiko-Ago; Idogun Oko Oloti; Igbole; Iseni; Itasa; Keun II; Madi Village; Okan Village; Oke Aba Village; Ologbo; Olopele; Onipako Village; Oyan; Sabeleke
Iwajowa	Idiko-Ile	202116	Aba Jagba; Aba Lamidi; Alaidan; Forekemi I; Forekemi II; Forekemi III; Gaa Irete; Idiko-Ile; Igbo Ikun; Igbo Olesin; Igbo Olubi; Igbodo; Konkonbido; LFI Farm Area; Okola; Omo Odo Oyinbo Village
Iwajowa	Iganna	202110	Igbo Eleeru; Aba Aladura I; Aba Alapinni; Aba Arugbo Oto; Aba Dabaru; Aba Gbelekale; Aba Makurdi; Aba Okeho; Aba Olokunola; Aba Omodudu; Aba Ontanyin; Aba Soonsi; Aba Tapa; Abowoyagba; Abule baba Isale; Abule Lemomu; Agba; Agbaakin; Agbegilori; Ago; Ajase; Ajimati Village; Akaparo Village; Akinniku; Alokolodo Village; Apaobe; Apata Ibadan; Arigbejo; Arole Ikoko; Ayede; Baba Igbagbo Village; Baba Mogba; Balogun Ofeefun; Basipa; Budo Iseyin; Dango; Eeri; Eesunla; Efunwumi; Eleeru; Elekokan; Fedegbo; Idi Ose; Idi Kasia; Idi Oro; Igbanna; Igbo Ako; Igbo Odan; Igbo Odun; Ikia; Imode; Inamere; Isagbon; Jagun Leeri; Joloko; Karimu; Lapaho; Mogoji; Odedudu; Ofeegun; Ofiki; Ogbu I; Ogbu II; Ogbua; Ojapa; Oke Ago; Okesu; Olomopupo; Olorunda; Olosan; Olowokese; Olukoti; Onikoro; Oobo; Otubu; Saaki; Sonson; Temidire; Tudi
Iwajowa	Ijio	202113	Abafon; Alajuba; Alapa; Baba Jugu; Ijio; Laafin; Ohori; Okooko; Oloro; Pele; Samo; Yellow
Iwajowa	Ilaji Ile	202115	Aaapa; Aba Aladura II; Aba Fulani; Aba Iteku; Aba Josiah; Aba Ogunlade; Alaje; Apara; Apinni; Ede; Eyinke; Igbogaa; Ilaji-Ile; Itee I; Itee II; Ogbere I; Ogbere II; Ogbere III; Oke- Oyan; Oke-Itunu; Osofa; Osuuru; Tubu
Iwajowa	Iwere Ile	202111	Aba Baba Sango; Aba Adeniran; Aba Alado; Aba Alaye; Aba Ayoola; Aba Baba; Aba Bamikarere - Alajuba; Aba Egbeda; Aba Ele; Aba Esudele; Aba Ibadan I; Aba Ibasun; Aba Idi Igba; Aba Igbo- Elewuro; Aba Ilaji; Aba Iseyin; Aba kobinu; Aba Kokumo; Aba Odo Dudu; Aba Okoro; Aba Onigilori/Adesina; Aba Osi; Aba Saminu Ladele; Adesina; Agbaruru; Agbonla/Tafa Village; Aiyetoro Ile; Ajekigbe Village; Akoda; Alahji Aibina Vill.; Alajuba; Alaraba Village; Alugben; Apakolo; Apata; Asipa; Balu Village; Eeye Village; Egbedeyi; Egideeye Village; Elewuro; Epo Village; Falana; Gaa Alhaji Dankaso; Gaa Alhaji Diko; Gaa Alhaji Gwani; Gaa Gooro-Belu Village; Gaa Idi-Igba; Gaa Momodu; Gaa Sanbo; Gaa Sunmonu; Galajimo; Gbendeke; Ibudo Oko Agbede; Idi - Iroko; Idi Ero Village; Idogun; Iwa; Iwere Ile; Jalepi; Kete; Keun I Village; Ogundeji; Ogungbenle; Ohori I Village; Ohori II Village; Oje Village; Olomu; Olurepepe; Onigbongbo Village; Owode; Owure; Sonyin; Sooso I Village; Sooso II Village; Tafa Village; Wayin
Kajola	Ilero	202108	Aaalago; Aba Oloyinka; Agbamo; Agbede; Agbeleje; Ago Ipapo; Ajala; Akintegbe; Alaje; Alapola; Alatori; Alatori Ojo; Alokoloja; Amudago; Arioje; Atupo; Ayetorokowosi; Bale Ayito; Egbeda; Gbodogbodo; Gbokoyi; Gboro; Idi Ayin; Idi Isin; Igbooopa; Igborokodowo; Igho Alubo; Ighoopa; Ilero; Ilero Ago; Isale Iwere; Jagun Abese; Labulo; Molete; Oguntaye; Oko oba; Olokobo; Olope; Olorunsogo; Olowa; Olukosi; Olukotun; Opopo Mawo; Osin Ago; Sangodokun; Sobaloju; Tofio
Kajola	Isemi-Ile/ Ilua	202109	Aaatan; Aba Saria; Abataibo; Abisapa; Agbamabiwon; Agunfon; Ajaji; Ajipopo; Akinlawon; Alafefe; Alusekere I and II; Apaja; Araromi; Asinmolowo; Asoore; Ayomaya; Babamogba; Bale Oke Ogun; Budo Alaga; Egbeleka; Ekuku; Eletu; Esinmu; Gbelekale; Gele Gele; Gelede; Idi Ayin; Idi Esu; Idi Igba; Idi Odan; Idi Ooro; Ifadamiduro Abiowo; Igbo Alayin; Igbo Asalu; Igbo Baale; Igbo bale; Igbo Iroko; Igbogaa; Ile Ago; Ilua; Imia; Imoba Ile; Isanrin; Isemi-Ile; Jofoba; Kangunmalo; Kogoru; Langbin; Lanlosi; Mamu Alamala; Mogaji; Motaku; Ogbugudu; Ogunlokeodo; Ojete; Oke Eru; Oke Oge; Okesado; Okuta Epa; Okuta Keyinkeyin; Olaitan Adimu; Ologbin; Ologoji; Olokoyo; Olole Ile; Onirokomeji; Onitiri; Oore; Opoopo; Sangolase; Sannagi; Sekere; Yakoyo
Kajola	Okeho	202107	Okeho and Village
Lagelu	Ejioku /Ile Igbon /Ariku	200101	Aba Edun; Aboke; Ariku; Ejioku; Elegbada; Elekuru; Eleyan Igbo; Fagbemi; Idi Akitiko; Idi Igba; Idi Ogun; Idi Ogun Omowale; Ile Igbon; Olodogboro; Oloja Oke; Onigbede; Onigbodo; Oyagaga; Oyediran
Lagelu	Lagun / Aromona	200107	Aba Bale Olobo; Aba Egan; Akankan; Aromona; Bale-Oya; Bolorunduro; Lagun; Laketu; Lamuyan; Ogburo; Ogunjana; Onilu; Owode
Lagelu	Lalupon / Iyana Offa	200102	Aba lgbira; Akinsawe; Gidi Gidi; Idi Osan; Iyana Offa; Jagun Egan; Lalupon; Molepin; Odo Oba; Papa Gegede; Sukuru
Lagelu	Offa-Igbo	200104	Aba Ogundipe; Aba Oje; Adedokun; Ajimagbo; Alawusa; Aromona; Balogun; Dagi; Elemu; Ode Ote; Offa Igbo; Olokuta; Wasimi
Lagelu	Ogunremi / Ogunsina	200108	Alatare; Eleruko; Ogunremi; Ogunsina; Ogunsowo
Lagelu	Olorunda/ Monatan	200103	Aba Alaropo; Agoro; Ajangboju; Akobo; Alapata; Alegongo; Arulogunehin; Arun; Asi; Balogun; Dosumu; Elewuro; Farinto; Idi Araba; Ijara; Iyana Church; Kasela; Kelebe; Leyland Area; Monatan; New Gbagi Market Area; Olode; Olodo; Olorunda; Olua; Onikokoro; Opeodu
Lagelu	Oyedeji/Olode/ Kutayi	200106	Aaje; Aba; Apatere; Kufli; Kutayi-Alapa; Ogo; Ogunbode; Olode; Oyedeji
Lagelu	Sagbe / Pabiekun	200105	Anifa; Atiba; Bangbola; Farukan; Isagede; Kiremi; Oteda; Pabiekun; Sagbe
Ogo Oluwa	Ogo Oluwa	210213	Ajaawa; Ayede; Ayetoro; Idewure; Iwo-Ate; Lagbedu; Odo-Oba; Opete; Otamokun
Olorunsogo	Igbeti	212102	Abenu; Abere-ijo; Agbogangan; Agbona; Ageri; Ago Fulani; Alakuko; Alapete; Alawa; Aloba-bi-oke; Aloba-Ile; Alusekere; Apa-Odo Opa; Asure-Ola; Ayekale; Binukonu; Bosaro; Bosere; Budo-Igbo; Edunjo; Eleke-Elere; Elekoto; Elemere; Elesin; Ewuji-Asa; Gaa Aliyu; Gaa Dende; Gaa Sangojinmi; Gaa sidi; Gaa Suberu; Gasali; Gboko; Gida Lalere; Godo-godo; Idi Ogede; Igbeti; Igbo Elemi; Jabiolowu; Jenkoro; Jeunkunu; Jokoro; Karamo; Kendoro; Kosigi; Lawoyin; Ogbagba; Okebode; Olododo; Olokoto-Iju; Olorubaba; Olowe; Olupo; Onigidudu; Onipede; Oniyeye; Oro-Ola; Osowuelegan; Pankoko; Tantomo; Tesi baba pupa
Orelope	Igboho Township	212103	Bonni; Igbope; Jakuta; Modeke; Obaago; Oke Afin; Oke Igboho
Orelope	Igboho Villages	212104	Aba Woru; Aba Yekini; Abo Mango; Aboni Ayo; Abule Soro; Adefi; Adenko; Adeta; Afun; Agunla; Ahoro Adan; Ajagba; Akingbasa; Alaba; Alagbon; Alaguntan; Alahji Beliki; Alarode; Amoke; Apata Alaje; Asode; Ate; Baaru; Baba Aladura; Baba Ogudu; Baba Pupa Yaaye; Baba Sango; Budo Idoro; Budo Igbetti; Budo Ilorin; Budo Iya Wule; Budo Nla; Budo Olowo; Budo Otun; Budo Oyo; Budo Sika; Budo Sule; Dede; Dogo; Dongari; Eesomi; Eleja; Faruku; Fomu; Gaa Baba Pupa; Gaa Lagbanda; Gaa Lambuo; Gaa Musa Fulani; Gaa Peepee; Gaa Yellow; Gaa Yisa Fulani; Gbadegun; Gungumi; Igbonla; Jagun; Jegede; Kaabi; Kajola; Kansa; Kujifi; Kunbi; Lasebu; Loko; Lube; Odo Ogun; Odo Oloko; Odo Owo; Odujin; Ogbora; Ogun Agbede; Ogunniyi; Oke Aran; Oke Bukun; Ologede; Olomoba; Olose; Oluwoko; Onigbaa; Onile-Aro; Onipako; Onsile Oyo; Opoo; Ori Oke; Salu I; Salu II; Sooro; Yaaye Bunmi; Yewere
Ori Ire	Ikoyi-Ile	210115	Abaja; Abeabaja; Acute; Afekulu; Afun; Afun Ile; Afun-Iju; Agbeni; Agidi; Ago Fulani; Aiyetoro; Ajegunle; Ajegunle Gbola; Ajibowu; Ajinopa; Akute; Aladie-Ile; Alagogo; Alapamowo; Alapere; Alatori; Alawodi; Alayan; Alfa Iwo; Alugbede; Aribaba; Arigidana; Arijo; Arungboogbin; Aselebe; Atunkumi; Baba Eko; Berekodo Dongari; Bootin; Budo Adu; Budo Akin; Budo Alade Atu; Budo Biyayin; Budo Igbo; Budo Musa; Budo Ode; Budo Ode Ajado; Dogo Oke; Egbejoda; Elebe; Elebenla; Elega; Elekulu; Elelu; Elemibo; Elerufila Ile; Elewure; Fowomole; Gaa Ahingba; Gani Iju; Gani Oja; Gote; Ibadi Ori; Idi Apa; Idi Eji; Idi Emi; Igbo Elemi; Igbo Kekere; Igbo Onito; Igbo-Eleru; Igboayin; Igbona; Igbori Ile; Igboroko; Ijana Yeye; Ilutitun; Ipata Oguri; Jegede; Keredolu; Ketere; Ketu; Kojete; Lahese; Mesunmoje; Mosadi Olorun; Mosumoje; Odesanwo; Ojatitun; Oke Bola; Okodudu; Olodan; Oloje; Olokiti; Olokoto-Iju; Olomopupo; Olopoto; Olorulekan; Olowo Iju; Olowo Oko Boro; Olugbejo; Omidoyin; Omo Erin; Onigarawa; Onigba; Onigbin; Oniguguru; Onikaraun; Onikolobo; Onilali; Onimangoro; Ori Okuta; Osarokun; Osowuelegan; Saako; Sarayi; Somodero; Tewure Iju; Tewure Ile; Wusa; Yakoyo
Ori Ire	Oolo	210116	Aba-Oba; Aba-Oyo; Abikehin; Adesehin; Agbalesun; Agbelepo; Ahere-Abata; Ahoro Esinele Ogbomoso; Ahoro Oko; Ajombadi-Idiayin; Alabidun; Alagbayun; Alagbede-Faji; Alahusa; Alakasu; Alamola; Alaropo Kekere; Alokomanro; Arohunpe; Awaye; Aweran Kale; Baba Sale; Balosa; Bosa; Bosunla; Dananu; Elegungun; Elesu Adeosun; Emi Abata; Gbemiro; Idi Emi; Idiamu; Igbo Alaye; Ikolaba; Ilekunkun; Ipeba; Isale-Oba; Itamaya; Koro; Lapalapa; Moleyo; Mosunmade; Moyin Moyin; Odogbo; Ogunniran; Ojelabi; Oke-Are; Oke-Awoni; Oke-Oba; Okedoyin; Okesubu; Olojiji; Olokemeji; Olokiti; Olomoleyin; Olugbile; Onalemole; Onisakada; Oolo and Villages; Opeola; Samo; Sorotan; Tapa; Yawuyi
Oyo West	Oyo Rural	211101	Oyo Villages
Saki East	Agbonle	203108	Aba Alade; Aba Daniel; Aba Dika; Aba Ilero; Aba Kutuwenji; Aba Laisi; Aba Panu; Aba Sango; Aba Sidi; Abakoko; Adekoroku; Adeseun; Agbokeke; Agbokele; Agbonle; Agunla; Alajuba; Alasan; Amukooko; Apata; Arikewuyo; Aromole; Babadele; Bole; Budo Apata; Budo Ayedun; Budo Lorin; Dogo; Egede; Egunla; Elepo; Igbo Eleni; Ijana; Ikoko; Ilado; Kajola; Kebiewu; Laimo; Laniyan; Musa; Odo Oba; Oja Iya; Okutalogun; Olojola; Olomometa; Olugbemi; Onikanga; Onikosa; Onise Oyo; Osoko; Saafu; Saaka; Yie
Saki East	Ago Amodu	203103	Aba Obi; Abuja; Adaku; Adeaga; Adeduntan; Agbagba; Ago Amodu; Ajaku; Alade; Aladura; Alakuko; Alesinloye; Apata; Apo; Arogede; Bada; Balelayo; Balogun; Erin; Ga Akani; Ga Amuda; Ikeeja; Ipade; Joseph; Jowuro; Koko; Lukutu; Makudi; Mangoro; Mayegun; Ogunlere; Old Oyo National Park; Ololu; Paanu; Pele; Sando; Sango; Tupuru
Saki East	Ogoro	203107	Afa; Ago; Ajandoku; Aketepe; Alakia; Alapo; Alfa; Amutiti; Baba Abudu; Basiru; Budo Gomina; Budo Kudoro; Budo Nla; Budo-Dele; Elera; Ikolaba; Komi; Kota I; Kota II; Lati; Layipapa; Makudi; Mofowure; Mogaji; Mojidi; Ogboro; Oge; Ojumokan; Olosekan; Paul; Pius Simoni; Sabata; Sala; Samari; Yawale; Yikiyiki; Zakare
Saki East	Oje-Owode	203109	Abu; Afa; Alade; Alapata; Alasan; Budo Bank; Budo musa; Egede; Erinoti; Ga; Ga Adamu; Ga Ake; Ga Oke-Owu; Ibilekan; Maye; Oje owode; Tiv; Yakuata
Saki East	Sepeteri	203102	Aba Dodo; Aba Nla; Adamu; Agbago; Agbedegun; Aho; Ajiromi; Ajirowo; Alapata; Aloba; Alota; Amolese; Awolere; Baba Ajoke; Baba Ijesa; Baba Ilorin; Bada; Bada Beji Makudi; Bado Monmo; Budo Akeem; Budo Akewe; Budo Karimu; Budo Monday; Dansafi; Disu; Egede; Eleja; Elepo; Godi; Ikupola; Imodi; Iworu; Iyake; James; Kanga; Kewu-lere; Kosobo; Kujifi; Mathew; Ode Ajayi; Odo-Owo; Odogodo; Ogunsipe; Oke Odo; Onikosa; Onisile; Peter; Sepeteri; Soho; Sule; Tankari; Temidire; Welewele; Yakubu; Yellow Egede
Saki West	Saki/Ekokan	203101	Aba Ilero; Aba Iseyin; Aba Ogbomosho; Aba Seele; Abatade; Abawaye; Agbele; Ago Oluwabi; Agunloye; Aroje; Asabari; Ataye; Barrack; Bodilu; Budo Eniola; Budo Ige; Ekokan; Gaa Dogo; Gbeponkan Oja; Idera; Idi Apa; Idi Ayin; Igaa Iyere; Igbo Irawo; Igbo Ologun; Igbo Olosan; Ilabo; Ilua; Kaje; Kogijo; Koomi; Mojo; Mua; Oge; Olomitutu; Onigbongbo; Orita Ogunmola; Owode; Saki Township; Sanmisala; Sekona; Tagiri; Tenleke; Wasangere
Surulere	Gambari/Baya	210105	Aba Kae; Abewo; Abogunde; Abuduka; Ajase; Alate; Aresejowi; Asileke; Baya Oje; Biro; Egbeda; Gambari; Gbede; Igbon; Iyelu; Jabata; Kangi; Mumuni; Olooye; Oloya; Paasi; Patiko Oloya
Surulere	Iresadu / Arolu	210102	Adudu; Aganyan; Alagbede; Alayin-Elebekebe; Arolu; Ayetoro; Baasa; Baba Egbe; Elesinmeta; Fasina; Gbena; Idi Opele; Idi oro; Idi-ori; Igboile; Ikle Odu; Ikunsin; Ilosin; Iranyin; Iregba; Iregba Bankole; Iresaapa; Iresadu; Kulodi; Labanju; Labode; Lekewogbe; Maya; Ogala; Ojo; Okiti; Olowosoke; Olukosi; Omonijuku; Pooro; Sadiwin; Sapati; Yakoyo
Surulere	Iwofin	210104	Aba Araoye; Ajegunle; Alayin; Bagbaji; Budo Oni Eran; Igbo-Ile; Iwofin; Oke-Asaa; Olorombo; Onisa; Oniyeya; Opatoyin; Owode; Temidire
Surulere	Oko	210103	Aagba Ijado; Ajagunsi; Aserawo; Bale Oba; Ebila-Temidire; Ikolo; Ilajue; Ilogbo; Ipasa; Iware; Laege; Mayin; Mumi; Odanbon-Adare; Ogede; Oko; Okolo; Onikeke; Oosu; Origi; Owoaso; Panda

== By electoral ward ==
Below is a list of polling units, including villages and schools, organised by electoral ward.

LGA	Ward	Polling unit name
Afijio	Ilora I	A. U. D Pry. School; Bode Open Space I; Bode Open Space II; Bode Open Space III; Oluwo Open Space; Odofin Open Space; Oja Isale Open Space; Olaosun Open Space
Afijio	Ilora II	Akindele Open Space; Alagbaa Open Space; Baptist Grammar School I; Baptist Grammar School II; Elekaara Comm. Bank O/Space; Elekaara Market O/Space; L. G. Dispensary; Mafikuyomi Open Space; Onikooko Open Space; Obanisola Open Space; Oja Oke Open Space I; Oja Oke Open Space II; Town Hall
Afijio	Ilora III	Aribombo Open Space; Atente Open Space; Ayetoro Open Space; Farm Settlement; Ibukun Olu Open Space; Onifa Pry. School
Afijio	Fiditi I	Ebenezer Pry. School, Fiditi; Jaafu Open Space; Methodist Pry. School; Motor Park Open Space; Ojude Ayo Open Space; Ojueru Open Space; Oleyo Open Space; Police Station Open Space; Catholic Pry. School; Christ Ang. School
Afijio	Fiditi II	Abese Open Space; Agbaakin Open Space; Egbejoda Market Open Space; Ijaye Ojutaye Open Space; Owode Open Space; Customary Court
Afijio	Awe I	Alagbede Open Space; Asaalu Open Space; Gbodooya Open Space; Lalemi Open Space; Lawn Tennis Open Space; Oke Bata Open Space; Oke Odofin Open Space
Afijio	Awe II	Awe High School; Baptist Pry. School; Idi Isin Open Space; Idi Orupa Open Space; Kiyeseni Open Space; Olode Isale Open Space
Afijio	Akinmorin/Jobele	Baale Jobele Open Space; L. G. Dispensary; Odofin Open Space; St. John's Pry School, Akinmorin; St. Peters School, Jobele; Town Hall, Akinmorin; Catholic Pry. School, Akinmorin
Afijio	Iware	Akinola Village O/Space; Aderibigbe Village O/Space; Iware Market Open Space; Iyanfa / Onsa Open Space; L. A. Pry. School, Iware
Afijio	Imini	Aba Jumo Open Space; Aba Anti Open Space; Ilu Aje Open Space; Court Hall I; Court Hall II
Akinyele	Olanla/Oboda/Labode	Agbaagi Village; Alade Village; Alayin Village; Beyioku Village; Elepo Village; Labode Village; Oboda Village; Olanla Village; Olanla (Idi Omo); Olanla (Ogbongan); Olunlosin Village; Onikarahun Village; Osanyindeyi Village; St. James' S Pry. School, Ogunjinmi
Akinyele	Arulogun/Eniosa/Aroro	Ajobo Village; Akinajo Village; Aroro Village; Atere Oritamerin Village; Court Hall, Arulogun; Denlokun Village; Idi Iyeye Village; Igbooloyin Village; Ogunranti Village
Akinyele	Olode/Amosun/Onidundu	Abatan Village; Amosun Village; Ileba Village; Olode Village; St. Luke's School, Onidundu; Tegiri Village
Akinyele	Ojo-Emo/Moniya	Ang. Pry. School, Akingbile I; Ang. Pry. School - Akingbile II; Alase Village; Apapa Village; Aponmode, Village; Behind I. I. T. A. Police Station; Court Hall, Moniya I; Court Hall, Moniya II; Dabiri Village; Idi Ose I; Idi Ose II; Islamic Pry. School, Moniya I; Islamic Pry. School, Moniya II; Islamic Pry. School - Moniya III; Islamic Pry. School, Moniya (Saw-Mill); Oboda (F. R. S. C.); Ojo-Emo Village; Omilabu Village
Akinyele	Akinyele/Isabiyi/Irepodun	Ajobo Village; Alagbaa Village; Ang. School, Otun-Agba-Akin; Babalawo Village; C. A. C. Pry. School, Akinyele; Irepodun Village; Isabiyi Village; Oguntilewa Village; Solalu Village
Akinyele	Iwokoto/Talontan/Idi-Oro	Ayun/Comm. Grammar School, Apapa Odan/Sokinloju; Babamogba Village; Bantu Village; Comm. Pry. School, Apapa Odan; Fasola Village; Idi-Oro Village; St. John's School, Talontan
Akinyele	Ojoo/Ajibode/Laniba	Adeosun/St. Matt. School, Oke-Ona; Aduloju; Ajibode Grammar School; Akobo Ojurin Area; Arulogun Road/Ojoo Market; Comm. Pry School Kajorepo; Comm. Pry. School, Sasa I; Comm. Pry School, Sasa II; Elemu Bus Stop/Opp. Old Bank I; Elemu Bus Stop/Opp. Old Bank II; H. L. A. School, Ojoo I; H. L. A. School, Ojoo II; Idi Ori, Sasa I; Idi Ori, Sasa II; Iyana Sasa I; Iyana Sasa II; Jakan; Kankun Court Hall; Koka/Olomo; Lagos Garage, Ojoo; Lagos Garage Trailer Park; Laniba/Oyatola; Market Junction, Sasa I; Market Junction, Sasa II; Methodist Pry. School, Idi Iroko I; Methodist Pry. School, Idi Iroko II; Mokankan/Onikoko; Office, Sasa I; Office, Sasa II; Ojoo Garage (Ilorin New Junction); Oloro Village; Olugbode Village; Onikoko, Village; Onile Aro Junction/Opp. Tokunbo Ojo I; Onile Aro Junction/Opp. Tokunbo Ojo II; Opposite Idc School, Akobo; Orogun Express Junction I; Orogun Express Junction II; Orogun Grammar School I; Orogun Grammar School II; Orogun Grammar School III; Orogun Grammar School IV; St. Mathias School, Orogun I; St. Mathias School, Orogun II; St. Mathias School, Orogun III; St. Mathias School, Orogun IV; St. Mathias School, Orogun V; St. Matthew's School, Tubosun; Very Close To Oyediji
Akinyele	Ijaye/Ojedeji	Ajeja Village; Ajobo Village; Atan Ojedele Village; Fagbenro Village; Isioye Village; Iware Village; Ojedeji Village; Olomitutu Village; Saanu Village; Sango Ibon Salv. Army School; Sango Ibon (Jarija); Tola Larumo Village; U. N. A. School, Ijaye I; U. N. A. School, Ijaye II
Akinyele	Ajibade/Alabata/Elekuru	Agbedo Village; Balogun Akinbola Village; Baptist School, Laleye; Elekuru Adekomi Village; Olorisa Village; Salv. Army School, Ajibade; St. James' S School, Alabata; St. John's School, Onibon-Nla
Akinyele	Olorisa-Oko/Okegbemi/Mele	Asani Village; I. D. C. School, Okegbemi; Mele; Mele (Olorunwe); Meth. School, Olorisa-Oko; St. Matthew's School, Ejitolu
Akinyele	Iroko	C. A. C. School, Iroko Village; Olowogbo Village; Omotunde H. L. A Village; Oretu Village; St. Thomas School, Iroko
Atiba	Oke-Afin 1	Abudu; Alawo; Areago; Atingisi; Iludero; Ilusinmi; Infront Of Atiba Community Bank; Behind Local Government Dispensary; Obagbori
Atiba	Oke-Afin II	Aloba; Iyalamu Dende; Iyalamu (Oke Oloola); Janta; Olori-Eru; Olugbile; Otesin; Sarumi
Atiba	Aremo	Adesina; Akesan; Alagbede/Are Erumosanyin; Aremo; Aremo/Oridota; Balogun Maje
Atiba	Bashorun	Agbaa; Apologun; Areago; Asanmimi; Awaye; Ayanbiyi; Baago; Idi-Ogun; Obe; Ofemo; Taku
Atiba	Agunpopo I	Akiniku; Idi-Agbon; Okansa; Oke-Oloola; Onibula; Sakuta; Sembe/Ekarun
Atiba	Agunpopo II	Agbaakin Ajiroba; Agbaakin Ashamu; Alara (Near Moriyeba); Busari; Elewi; Elewuro/Ogunte; Ijawaya; Jowoese; Lagunna; Ofa Meta; Okedoyin I; Okedoyin II; Onire Bara; Waro
Atiba	Agunpopo III	Agbaakin Oke; Ajegunle/ Boroboro; Akaparo; Akunlemu; Amejiogbe; Ekeje/Agunpopo; Gbanta; Ona Aka I; Ona Aka II; St. Michael Esiele
Atiba	Ashipa I	Aatan; Ajalaruru/Ojaala; Ashipa; Ikolaba; Latula; Odemoja; Ogbegbe
Atiba	Ashipa II	Abolupe I; Abolupe II; Ago Omiseyi; Ajombadi; Akodudu I; Akodudu II; Baale Agbe; Koso; Lagbiyan; L. A. School, Sabo I; L. A. School, Sabo II; Ojegbolu; Olori-Oso; Oyatutu; Saakin; Sakutu Sabo
Atiba	Ashipa III	Agberinde; Alubata; Arinkinkin; Ayetoro Elesun; Ayetoro Ajegbendu; Elerinle; Ida-Ogun I; Ida-Ogun II; Igbo-Ologun; Igbo Nla; Ilowa; Iponrin Sangodeyi; Koso-Amo; Latula; Ojataye; Origbemidele; Otefon; Ponbe Oloya I; Ponbe Oloya II
Atisbo	Tede I	Baptist Primary School I; Baptist Primary School II (A); Baptist Primary School II (B); Baptist Primary School II ©; Egbeomo Compound Area I; Egbeomo Compound Area II; Bricklayer Old Church Area I; Bricklayer Old Church Area II; Okudi Village I; Okudi Village II; Agoro's Compound Area I; Agoro's Compound Area II; Areoje Compound Area; Areoje Babani Area; Gbenagbena's Compound Area; Opposite Ebenezer Church
Atisbo	Tede II	Maternity Centre; Town Hall I (A); Town Hall I (B); Town Hall II (A); Town Hall II(B); Obada Market/Dispensary (A); Obada Market/Dispensary (B); Rcm. Primary School I(A); Rcm. Primary School I (B); Rcm. Primary School II (A); Rcm. Primary School II (B); A. U. D. Primary School; Ayangun's Compound I; Ayangun's Compound II; Baara's Village I; Baara's Village II; Ajebamidele Village I; Ajebamidele Village II; Alakuko Village; Gaa Sambo I; Gaa Sambo II; Gaa Sambo III; Co-Operative Building Area
Atisbo	Irawo Ile	Baptist Primary School I (A); Baptist Primary School I (B); Baptist Primary School II (A); Baptist Primary School II (B); Baptist Primary School III; A. U. D. School I; A. U. D. School II (A); A. U. D. School II (B); A. U. D. School III (A); A. U. D. School III (B); Post Office I; Post Office II; Balogun's Compound; Bilekale Compound Area
Atisbo	Irawo Owode	Nursery Primary School I (A); Nursery Primary School I (B); Nursery Primary School II (A); Nursery Primary School II (B); Alusekere Compound; A. U. D. Primary School I; A. U. D. Primary School II; A. U. D. Primary School III; Baptist Primary School II; Isale Ofiki 0/S I; Isale Ofiki 0/S II; Isale Ofiki 0/S III; Isale Ofiki 0/S IV; Oniyeni Compound Area
Atisbo	Ofiki	Baptist Primary School I; Baptist Primary School II; Baptist Primary School III; Baptist Primary School IV; L. A. Primary School I; L. A. Primary School II; L. A. Primary School III; L. A. Primary School IV; Local Government Dispensary I; Local Government Dispensary II; Town Hall I; Town Hall II; Agbere Market I; Agbere Market II; Agbere Market III; Onimongoro's Compound I; Onimongoro's Compound II; Central Market Ofiki I; Central Market Ofiki II; Ajinawo Compound; Aluko Compound Isale Aluko
Atisbo	Alaga	Central Market Alaga I; Central Market Alaga II; Central Market Irawote I; Central Market Irawote II; Central Market Okeho I; Central Market Okeho II; Central Market Kajewole; Abugudu Primary School; Central Market Adeoye I; Central Market Adeoye II; Oore Village I; Oore Village II
Atisbo	Ago Are I	First Baptist Primary School, Ago-Are I; First Baptist Primary School, Ago-Are II; First Baptist Primary School, Ago-Are Iiii; First Baptist Primary School, Ago-Are IV; Local Government Dispensary I; Local Government Dispensary II; Oke Ado Area; L. A. Primary School I; L. A. Primary School II; Aba Kajola I; Aba Kajola II; N. U. D. Primary School I (A); N. U. D. Primary School I (B); N. U. D. Primary School II (A); Janjan; N. U. D Primary School II (B)
Atisbo	Ago Are II	Court Hall Ago-Aare I; Court Hall Ago-Aare II; Court Hall Ago-Aare III; Court Hall Ago-Aare IV; Onile Nla Compound; Aba Oke; Second Bapt. Primary School I; Second Bapt. Primary School II (A); Second Bapt. Primary School II (B); Arika Compound Area I; Arika Compound Area II; Aba Raheem I; Aba Raheem II; Sobaloju Compound; Aba Simeon; Akewe Compound; Baptist Secondary School/Co-Operative; Balode Compound
Atisbo	Owo/Agunrege/Sabe	Baptist Primary School I, Owo; Baptist Primary School II, Owo (A); Baptist Primary School II, Owo (B); Co-Operative Building Area Owo I; Co-Operative Building Area Owo II; Community Primary School, Agunrege I; Community Primary School, Agunrege; Primary School I, Sabe; Primary School II, Sabe (A); Primary School II, Sabe (B)
Atisbo	Baasi	Corner Owo Primary School; Baptist Primary School, Baasi; Budo Alaka; Aba Asaju
Egbeda	Erunmu	Ago Igbira, Erunmu I; Ago Igbira, Erunmu II; Arije; Baale Ajinti; Baale's Compound, Erunmu I; Baale's Compound, Erunmu II; Erunmu Court Hall; Erunmu Market I; Erunmu Market II; Idc School, Adeleye; Idc School, Fatumo I; Idc School, Fatumo II; Isale Oja, Erunmu; L. A. School, Erunmu I; L. A. School, Erunmu II; Oloro Village; S. D. A. School, Ataari; S. D. A. School, Erunmu; Town Hall, Ataari
Egbeda	Ayede/Alugbo/Koloko	Alapake; Onilemo Village; S. D. A. Primary School, Alugbo I; S. D. A. Primary School, Alugbo II; S. D. A. Primary School, Ayede I; S. D. A. Primary School, Ayede II; S. D. A. Primary School, Koloko; S. D. A. Primary School, Oloba; S. D. A. Primary School, Oyindaola; Solademi Village
Egbeda	Owobaale/Kasumu	Apaso Village; Community High School, Kasumu; Community High School, Owobaale; Efunwole Village; Ibiti Village; Ore Nla Village; Primary School, Adekomi; Primary School, Gidigidi I; Primary School, Gidigidi II; S. D. A. School, Owobaale I; S. D. A. School, Owobaale II; St. Matthew School, Apoku I; St. Matthew School, Apoku II
Egbeda	Olodan/Ajiwogbo	Anglican Primary School, Jooda I; Anglican Primary School, Jooda II; Gberinmi Village; Islamic Mission School, Olodan I; Islamic Mission School, Olodan II; St. Andrew's Primary School, Ajia; United Primary School, Ajiwogbo I; United Primary School, Ajiwogbo II; United Primary School, Ajiwogbo
Egbeda	Olodo/Kumapayi I	Gbenku Primary School; I. D. C. School, Olujinle I; I. D. C. School, Olujinle II; Kumapayi Village; Odan Primary School; Oki Town I; Oki Town II; Oki Town III; Olodo Secondary School; Olukunle Primary School; St. Peter's School, Oganso I; St. Peter's School, Oganso II; St. Peter's School, Ojuolape; Wofun Village I; Wofun Village II
Egbeda	Olodo II	Adabale (Opp. Deacon Babatunde's Residence); Adogba; Agoro; Apete Compound; Arolu; Ayedaade; Ayepe I; Ayepe II; Ayepe Molade Street; Ayepe Primary School (Molade); Bishop Philips Academy I; Bishop Philips Academy II; Bolowojaye Adogba; Bostay Chemist I; Bostay Chemist II; C. A. C. Primary School, Monatan; Efunwole Layout; Molade; Monatan Turning Point; Ola Davies (Open Space Around Chief Agboola's Residence); Olope Meta; Opeyemi I; Opeyemi II; Oyediji Petrol Station; Papa Adogba; Raji Sekere
Egbeda	Olodo III	Agbalegan; Agbowo I; Agbowo II; Alagbaa Village; Alarobo; Boole Village; Idi Mango; Irepodun; Iyalode; Olodi Abepe; Oloya Compound; Wakajaye Primary School
Egbeda	Osegere/Awaye	Aba Alufaa; C. A. C. Primary School, Alabuke; Community High School, Osegere; Elefon Village; Idogun Village; Maternity Centre, Awaye; Primary School, Olukeye; St. John's Primary School, Erinmi; St. Peter's Primary School, Osegere
Egbeda	Olode/Alakia	Adegbayi Village I; Adegbayi Village II; Agbowo Village; Alakia Village I; Alakia Village II; Alalubosa (Open Space Behind, N. B. Plc); Aroye; Isebo Village I; Isebo Village II; Jagun Village; Maternity Centre, Awotunde; Ogo-Oluwa Community Behind Agbala Itura; Olode (Amuro Onlu); Olode Village; Olosan; Primary School, Akinfenwa
Egbeda	Olubadan Estate	Alarere (Lagos Express); Alarere Layout; Araromi; Efun Primary School I; Efun Primary School II; Gbagi; Gbaremu Market; I. D. C. Primary School, Olubadan; Idi-Iroko; Maku Ogbere; Maku Ogbere (Ile Baale); New Garage; Ogbere Gbangba; Ogbere Idi-Osan (Gram. School; Ogbere Oloba; Ogbere Oremeji; Oke Koto; Olaogun Area; Olubadan Estate; Onideure; Onipepeye; Orelope Estate; Orelope Sawmill; Orisunbare Sawmill; Sawmill Old Ife Road; Sunbare Sawmill (Adabi); Temidire Market; Urban Day Gramm. School, Old Ife Road
Ibadan North	Ward I N2	Agbo Compound; Ayoola Compound I; Ayoola Compound II; Galaxy T. V. I; Galaxy T. V. II; I. M. G. Court; Islamic Mission School, Odoye I; Islamic Mission School, Odoye II; Lawore Compound; Opposite National Petrol Isale-Alfa; St. Mary School; Unipetrol, Isale Alfa I; Unipetrol, Isale Alfa II
Ibadan North	Ward II, N3	Afiku Compojnd; Apostolic Primary School; Ayegun Mosque; Bola Street; Bolanta Sapati I; Bolanta Sapati II; Ebenezer Primary School; I. M. G. School, Nalende; Inalende Market; Ire Akari; Jodat; Nalende Mosque; Nawar-Deen School; Ode Olo; Ojo-Oniro Compound; Oke-Oloro; Opoyeosa/Oniyanrin Junction; Opposite Nalende Mosque; Opposite Nitel Oniyanrin; St. John Primary School; St. Peter School; St. Stephen School. I; St. Stephen School II; St. Stephen School III; In Front Of Borokini House; Elelede Compound
Ibadan North	Ward III, N4	Opposite Former Tribune; Agip Petrol Station; Salem Baptist Church; Yemetu Police Station; Salvation Army School, Yemetu; Baptist School Oritamefa; Medico Area, Agbada Gbudu; I. M. G. N4, Yemetu; Yemetu Oje I; Yemetu Oje II; Adabale; Kanbi House; Licensing Office, Yemetu; Alawada Yemetu; St. Michael School, Yemetu; Aladorin Junction, Yemetu I; Aladorin Junction, Yemetu II; Beside Agala Forest; Oke Aremo Eruku I; Oke Aremo Eruku II; Biro Oke Are I; Biro Oke Are II; Akabiako; Oluwo Compound; St. Paul School, Oke Are I; St. Paul School, Oke Are II; Petrol Station Oje; Opposite Zion Chemist; Adeoyo Maternity; Olubadan Aminu; Medico Junction; Isale Alfa Adeoyo; Temidire Fish Depot; Mobil Petrol Station/Oke Are Road Yemetu; Ile Eja Temidire; Yemetu Oja
Ibadan North	Ward IV, N5a	Sanni Street, Idi-Tap; Sani Street, Idi-Omo; Aya Jamogiri; Oke Compound; Licensing Office, Igosun; Methodist Primary School N5(Nta) I; Methodist Primary School N5(Nta) II; Salvation Army School, Kube; Odo Alagbafo I; Odo Alagbafo II; Slaughter Slab; St. John Primary School; Owotutu House; Opposite Ali-Iwo Compound; Local Government Dispensary Agodi; C. A. C. Igosun I; C. A. C. Igosun II; Omikunle Compound; Otun Compound; I. M. G. Igosun; Idi-Omo Mosque; Idi-Omo Road, Itutaba; Idi-Omo, Itutaba; Jagunmolu, Itutaba; Akintoye Street, Itutaba; Ajibodu Street, Itutaba I; Ajibodu Road/Irefin Junction; Ajibodu Road, Itutaba; Ajibodu Street, Itutaba II
Ibadan North	Ward V, N5b	Ikolaba Grammar School; Ikolaba High School; Post Office Agodi Gate; Federal Housing, Ikolaba; Bibilari Shopping Complex; In Front Of Customs, Agodi; Railway Crossing Bodija; Basorun/Ojoo High School Asi; Brick House Hotel, Bodija; Methodist School II, Bodija; Late Chief Lekan Salami Estate; Owo Egbeleke; Front Of Late Alhaji Fatai Olusegun House; Mt. Olivet Grammar School; Islamic High School, Basorun; C & S New Eden Primary School; St. Patrick Grammar School; Osunkaye Inu Koko; Methodist Grammar School, Bodija; Oluwo-Nla; Front Of Late Peller's House; Water Reservoir; Akingbola Mosque; Bishop Onabanjo High School; Sonbeam Nursery/Primary School; Idi-Orogbo; Ashi Village (Near The Stream); Adegoke Layout, Ashi; Arapasopo; Basorun Guest House; Odo-Elede; Festola Nursery/Primary School; Opposite Olona Mosque; Are Avenue; Halleluyah Nursery/Primary School; Junction Nubifal Pharmacy
Ibadan North	Ward VI, N6a Part I	Old Motor Park, Sabo; Ibadan Recreation Club; Primary School, Jemibewon; Opposite Texaco Adamasingba; St. Gabriel Grammar School, Mokola; Palm Chemist Adamasingba; Sabo Market; Late Oba Sabo Palace I; Late Oba Sabo Palace II; Central Mosque, Sabo; New Oba Sabo Palace; Opposite Uncle Joe Chemist; Opposite Shopping Complex, Adamasingba; Scala Cinema, Sabo I; Scala Cinema, Sabo II
Ibadan North	Ward VII, N6a Part II	Fayemi Street, Taxaco, Ore Meji I; Fayemi Street, Taxaco, Ore Meji II; Ajegunle Street, Coca-Cola I; Ajegunle Street, Coca-Cola II; St. Louis Grammar School; Opposite Sunny Day Model School I; Opposite Sunny Day Model School II; Opposite Arabic High School I; Opposite Arabic High School II; Alawode Street I; Alawode Street II; Constance Model School; Fatodu Street (Tunatol); Adeola Crescent I; Adeola Crescent II; Amisu Street Oke Itunu; Railway Chambers I; Railway Chambers II; Behind Texaco; C. A. C. Obadare; Estate Oke Itunu; In Front Of Adediran Mosque; Popoola Chambers I; Popoola Chambers II
Ibadan North	Ward VIII, N6a Part III	Loko Compound; Poly Road, Ijokodo; Mechanic Village; Agbaje Road, Ijokodo; Opposite Christ Life Ministry; Apostolic Church, Sango Market; Estate Junction, Agbaje; Bibi Press, Ijokodo; Along Power Line; C. A. C. Oke Itura; Kalejaye; Opposite Fijabi Mosque; Okoro Junction; Behind Mechanic Garage Okoro; Gbaremu; Biskat Chemist Ijokodo; Idi-Ito Junction; St. James African Church, Isopako; Taiwo Street, Sango Alarometa; Cassava Processing Centre; Transformer Sango; Durotolu Maternity; Bibi Press, Agbaje Road; Odo Bale Idi Transformer; Bembo Hotel Junction; Opposite Poly 2nd Gate; Children Welfare Centre; Agbaje Junction; Sango Alaro; Cottage Clinic, Sango; In Front Of Gateway Baptist, Sango; Odo Baale; Alaro; Adamasingba Area, Okoro
Ibadan North	Ward IX, (N6b Part I)	Behind Oba Akinbiyi High School (I); I. M. G. Mokola I; I. M. G. Mokola II; Behind Bisi Bookshop; Colour Laboratory; Ago Tapa; Alafia Primary School I; Alafia Primary School II; Alafia Primary School III; C & S New Eden School; Akinlolu Printers; Back Of Uncle Joe; Opposite Veterinary, Mokola
Ibadan North	Ward X, N6b Part II	U. C. H. Park; U. C. H. Canteen; Adeyi Avenue; Baptist Church Area, Bodija; Faith Medical Clinic; Awolowo Avenue; Ajibade Street Jac-Debo I; Ajibade Street Jac-Debo II; Sanusi Street; Obasa; Alabiamo Street, Beside All Souls; Opposite Subuola Nursery/Primary School; Ondo Street, Old Bodija; Ilaro Street, Old Bodija; Osuntokun Avenue; Ss Peter & Paul Bus-Stop; Oba Akinbiyi High School II
Ibadan North	Ward XI, Nw8	South Poly Bus-Stop (Campus); Staff Quarters Unity Hall Poly; Poly North Campus; Around Police Station; Inside Sango Garage; Moradeyo; Ope Abayomi; Inside Emmanuel College Of Theology; Queen's Hall, U. I.; Sultan Bello Hall; U. I.; Mellanby/Tedder Halls, U. I.; Namdi Azikwe Hall, U. I. I; Namdi Azikwe Hall, U. I. II; Independence Hall, U. I.; Idia Hall, U. I.; Awolowo Hall, U. I.; Postal Agency, Abadina; Abadina Primary School, U. I.; Mechanic Village, Samonda
Ibadan North	Ward XII, Nw8	Along Adeoye Street, Agbowo; In Front Of Barika Hotel; Along Ajetunmobi Street; Ansarudeen I; Ansarudeen II; Opposite Ajegunle Baptist Church; Beside 2 Brothers, Ojokondo; Nepa Transformer, Agbowo; St. Thomas Primary School, Agbowo; Beside Ike-Oluwa Mosque; Irawo Junction, Agbowo; Aba Apata I; Aba Apata II; In Front Of New Apostolic Church; Alhaji Salawu Sanusi Street I; Alhaji Salawu Sanusi Street II; Zonal Health Centre, Bodija I; Zonal Health Centre, Bodija II; Zonal Health Centre, Bodija; Ogunyase Street, Agbowo; Farayola Street I; Farayola Street II; Tunakin Photo; Kara Bodija; League Of Imams; In Front Of Orisun Catering; Opposite Gooddy Technical; Irepodun Street, Near Goddy; Iyana Bodija Along Express; Conference Hall, Bodija; Methodist School I, Bodija; Olive Primary School; Alhaji Ewenla Street; Back Of Agbowo Shopping Complex; Iso Pako Bodija; Bodija Market/Express Junction; Yidi Praying Ground, Apata; Adedokun Street; Beside Celestial Church Near Yemoja Stream (Agbowo); Akinbode Street (Agbowo)
Ibadan North East	Ward I. Ei	Akintayo's Compound I; Akintayo's Compound II; Akinyele's Compound I; Akinyele's Compound II; Bioku's Compound; Ile Onimo Isale Osun; Ita Baale Olugbode I; Ita Baale Olugbode II; Labiran Compound; Odo Osun Compound I; Odo Osun Compound II; Open Space Odo Osun Compound; Olubodun's Compound; Open Space Beyerunka I; Open Space Between Beyerunka Alafara Bridge; Open Space Beyerunka II; Olugbode's Compound
Ibadan North East	Ward 2 Ni (Part II)	Adepo's Compound I; Adepo's Compound II; Ogboriefon's Compound I; Ogboriefon's Compound II; Ogboriefon's Compound III; Ogboriefon's Compound IV; Jenriyin's Compound I; Jenriyin's Compound II; Jenriyin's Compound III; Osa Oko I; Osa Oko II
Ibadan North East	Ward III. E3	Alagba's Compound Ojagbo I; Alagba's Compound Ojagbo II; Open Space Near Aiku's Compound; Space At The Back Of Adeyelu; Space Beside Akoju's Compound; Space In Front Alapafon; Open Space In Front Of Arolu's Compound; Open Space Beside Ogundipe; Open Space Jagun's Compound I; Open Space Jagun's Compound II; Open Space Idi-Ose, Ojagbo; Space In Front Of Mato's Compound; Open Space Onideure; Space In Front Olunlade's Compound I; Space In Front Olunlade's Compound II
Ibadan North East	Ward IV E4	Abioye's Compound; Adelagun Primary School, Gbelekale I; Adelagun Primary School, Gbelekale II; Agbatiolese Kosodo, Ojagbo I; Agbatiolese Kosodo, Ojagbo II; Open Space Beside Agbongun; Open Space At Ajegunle's Compound; Space Near Ajegunle Olomoyoyo; Open Space At Aladorin Aremo; Space In Front Of Asani Obisesan House, Aperin I; Space In Front Of Asani Obisesan House, Aperin II; Boripe Area I; Boripe Area II; Islamic Primary School, Gbelekale I; Islamic Primary School, Gbelekale II; Open Space Beside Gbelekale; Idi-Orogbo - Adekile; Open Space At Ile Elepo, Aremo; Open Space Near Ile Iyasanyin, Ojagbo; Ilupeju's Open Space, Adekile; Jegede's Compound; Labosinde Omowumi Area 8 I; Labosinde Omowumi Area 8 II; Labosinde Omowumi Area 8 III; I. M. G. School, Ladunni; Lamidi's Compound I; Lamidi's Compound II; Oriade Bakery; Ogboriefon Orita Aperin; Olubadan High School, Aperin I; Olubadan High School, Aperin II; Space In Front Of Oluyoola House; Open Space Ogboriefon Adekile; Ratibi Primary School; Space In Front Of Shop Merin Koloko; Ratibi Primary School I; Ratibi Primary School II
Ibadan North East	Ward V E5a	Open Space Beside Chief Adeosun's House, Labiran; Open Space Of Aderogba Compound; Open Space Near Aderogba Isale Aifa; Open Space At Aderogba Compound; Open Space At Aderogba, Labiran; Open Space Beside Atari Agbon, Labiran; Open Space Around Beyerunka Junction I; Open Space Around Beyerunka Junction II; Open Space Beside Igbaro Mosque; Open Space Behind Petrol Station, Labiran; Open Space Beside Osunware's House
Ibadan North East	Ward VI E5b	Open Space In Front Of Alhaji Basorun's House, Alafara Oje 1; Open Space In Front Of Alhaji Basorun's House, Alafara Oje 2; Open Space Beside Chief Akinade's House, Oje I; Open Space Beside Chief Akinade's House, Oje II; Open Space Ilepo Aderinto I; Open Space Ilepo Aderinto II; Open Space Ile Olugbodi; Iso Ologede, Oje Market; I. M. G. Primary School, Oje I; I. M. G. Primary School, Oje II
Ibadan North East	Ward VII E6	Space Beside Aborisade's Compound; Alafara Olubadan I; Alafara Maternity; Alafara Olubadan II; Space Beside Amosun's Compound; Aremo Store; Space Beside Primary School, Aremo; H. L. A. Aremo Primary School I; H. L. A. Aremo Primary School II; H. L. A. Aremo Primary School III; Atipe Junction I; Atipe Junction II; Space In Front Idi Radio; Elekunkun Street, Ajegede; Space Beside Lawyer Gbenla's House; Space Infront Idi Radio; Ile Aborisade's Compound; Ile Ago
Ibadan North East	Ward VIII E7 I	Open Space Adepele Area; Open Space Around Alalubosa, Ode-Aje I; Open Space Around Alalubosa, Ode-Aje II; Asunle, Aremo Junction; Dispensary, Aremo I; Dispensary, Aremo II; St. Peter's Aremo I; St. Peter's Aremo II; Open Space Idi Aka Babasale I; Open Space Idi Aka Babasale II; Open Space Ile Eja, Ode-Aje I; Open Space Ile Eja, Ode-Aje II; Islamic Primary School, Ode-Aje I; Islamic Primary School, Ode-Aje II; I. M. G. Primary School, Ode Aje I; I. M. G. Primary School, Ode Aje II; I. M. G. Primary School, Ode Aje III; Outer Premises I. M. G., Ode Aje; Open Space Around Islamic Primary School, Ode-Aje I; Open Space Around Islamic Primary School, Ode-Aje II; Open Space Around Islamic Primary School, Ode-Aje III; Ode Aje Ololu; C & S School, Oje Olokun I; C & S School, Oje Olokun II; C & S School, Oje Olokun III; Open Space Okuseinde; Open Space Olorunfemi Compound, Atipe; St. Mary Primary School, Oluyoro I; St. Mary Primary School, Oluyoro II; Open Space Around Olusoji's Compound; St. Cyprian School, Oluyoro I; St. Cyprian School, Oluyoro II; Space Around St. Mary Primary School I; Space Around St. Mary Primary School II
Ibadan North East	Ward IX E7ii	Christ The King Primary School, Agugu I; Christ The King Primary School, Agugu II; Christ The King Primary School, Agugu III; I. M. G. School, Agugu I; I. M. G. School, Agugu II; Community Primary School, Ayekale I; Community Primary School, Ayekale II; Open Space, Ayekale I; Open Space, Ayekale II; Open Space, Ayekale III; United Secondary School, Idi Obi I; United Secondary School, Idi Obi II; United Secondary School, Idi Obi III; Open Space, Idi Obi, Alakara Junction I; Open Space Idi Obi, Alakara Junction II; Ilupeju, Idi Obi; Ire Akari, Agugu; Around Arabic School, Isale Yidi Lanase I; Around Arabic School, Isale Yidi Lanase II; Open Space, Iyana Idiroko; Koloko, Idi Araba; Lagelu Grammar School I; Lagelu Grammar School II; Oke Badan High School; Oke Badan Near Adeyemo's Compound; Open Space, Ologbojo I; Open Space, Ologbojo II; Queen Of Apostle, Oluyoro I; Queen Of Apostle, Oluyoro II; Queen Of Apostle, Oluyoro III; In Front Of Police Station I; In Front Of Police Station II; In Front Of Police Station III; Renascent High School I; Renascent High School II; Open Space Shop Merin, Koloko I; Open Space Shop Merin, Koloko II; Open Space Shop Merin, Koloko III
Ibadan North East	Ward X E8	Open Space Elero Meta; Ile Delesolu; Ile Egunjenmi; Ile Ogundipe; Ile Ponki; Space Beside Irefin Palace I; Space Beside Irefin Palace II; Space Beside Irefin Palace III; Space Beside Irefin Palace IV; C. A. C. School, Irefin; Public Toilet, Area Oje; Oje Maternity I; Oje Maternity II; Open Space Oloro Mosque I; Open Space Oloro Mosque II; I. M. G. School, Onikokoro
Ibadan North East	Ward XI E9 I	Space At Abayomi Bus Stop I; Space At Abayomi Bus Stop II; Space At Abayomi Bus Stop III; Space At Abayomi Bus Stop IV; Open Space Agbaakin; Space Along Alayaki Street, Iwo Road I; Space Along Alayaki Street, Iwo Road II; Army Children Primary School I; Army Children Primary School II; Army Children Primary School III; Army Children Primary School IV; Army Children Primary School V; Army Children Primary School VI; Open Space Along Atele Street, Iwo Road I; Open Space Along Atele Street, Iwo Road II; Bankole's House I; Bankole's House II; Basorun High School I; Basorun High School II; Basorun High School III; Bode Wasinmi; Idi-Ape; Open Space Around Idi Ape Playing Ground I; Open Space Around Idi Ape Playing Ground II; Iwo Road Police Station Area I; Iwo Road Police Station Area II; Iwo Road Police Station Area III; Angle 90, Iwo Road; Open Space Around Jamb Office; Open Space Around Kumapayi Street, Iwo Road I; Open Space Around Kumapayi Street, Iwo Road II; Open Space Around Kumapayi Street, Iwo Road III; Open Space Around Kumapayi Street, Iwo Road IV; Open Space Around Kumapayi Street, Iwo Road V; Space Around Lagos Motor Park; Olorombo I; Olorombo II; St. Paul's Yanbule
Ibadan North East	Ward XII E9 II	H. L. A. School I; H. L. A. School II; Space In Front Of Abc Chemist, Agodi; Space Beside Customary Court, Agodi; Space In Front Of Aliwo Compound I; Space In Front Of Aliwo Compound II; Agodi Motor Park; Apete Amulegbodo Old Ife Road; Green Spring, Ibadan I; Green Spring, Ibadan II; Holy Trinity, Ibadan I; Holy Trinity, Ibadan II; I. K. Dairo Street, Old Ife Road; Loyola College I; Loyola College II; Methodist School, E9 I; Methodist School, E9 II; Space In Front Of Ogunwolu, Isale Agbede; Space Around Oke Adu Hall; Space Around Oke Adu Mosque; Space Oke Adu, Okekoto, Gbenla I; Space Oke Adu, Okekoto, Gbenla II; Seventh Day Primary School, Old Ife Road; Entrance To Catholic Hospital, Oluyoro I; Entrance To Catholic Hospital, Oluyoro II; Onipasan Area, Ibadan I; Onipasan Area, Ibadan II; Onipasan Area, Ibadan III; Onipasan Area, Ibadan IV; Onipepeye I; Onipepeye II; Space Around Yidi Gate, Agodi I; Space Around Yidi Gate, Agodi II; Space Around Yidi Gate, Agodi III
Ibadan North West	Ward I Ni (Part I)	Abere Junction I; Abere Junction II; Alekuso Compound; Asipa Sango After Bridge; Asipa Sango Oritamerin I; Asipa Sango Oritamerin II; Idi-Omo Pamoya I; Idi-Omo Pamoya II; Laniba Compound I; Laniba Compound II; Okunola Iwere; Okutoro Compound
Ibadan North West	Ward 3 Nw1	Agbaje Primary School, Ayeye I; Agbaje Primary School, Ayeye II; Behind Agip Station Orita Merin; Durosaro's Compound; Near Omo's Radio I; Near Omo's Radio II; Ojoo Bus Stop Orita Merin; Olota Compound Agbeni; Open Space Ella's Compound; Open Space, Ololo Compound I; Open Space, Ololo Compound II
Ibadan North West	Ward 4 Nw2	Along Agbaje Road, Agbeni I; Along Agbaje Road, Agbeni II; Along Ibikunle's Compound, Ayeye; Along Ogunpa River, Amunigun; Around Amunigun Compound; Infront Of Adebisi Compound; Space Lakondoro's Compound I; Lagbeja's House; Akilapa's House; Open Space Ibikunle's Palace I; Open Space Ibikunle's Palace II; Open Space Laboopo Amunigun; Opposite Alarape Busari's House; Sacred Heart School, Idikan; Space Along Ogunlefi Orieru; Space Lakondoro's Compound II; Space Oota Compound, Idikan
Ibadan North West	Ward 5 Nw3 (Part I)	Near Lawyer's House Oke Padre; Open Space Ariyibi's Compound Mecho Shop; Open Space Ande's House Yeosa; Open Space Alapa Compound; Open Space Okeseni I; Open Space Okeseni II; Open Space First Baptist School, Idikan I; Open Space First Baptist School, Idikan II; Open Space Adebayo Nursery School; Open Space Obadara's House; Opposite Adagbada's House; Space Near Akinyemi's House; Space Near Jalaruru's Compound; St. Michael Primary School, Okeseni
Ibadan North West	Ward 6 Nw3 (Part I)	Along Araromi Behind The Stream - Oke Padre; Along Road To Ladapo's House I; Along Road To Ladapo's House II; At Asadele's Compound Abebi; At Idiagbon And Oloya's Compound, Abebi; At Olorode Compound, Abebi; In Front Of St. Patrick, Abebi; Lakondoro's Compound Lane (327); Open Space Adeyemo Owonbuwo - Yeosa; Open Space, Ile Adeyemo Owonbuwo; Open Space, Ile Yeosa Junction; Open Space Ladapo's House; Open Space Obe's House, Yeosa; Opposite Alanu Nursery School, Abebi; Space Around Daily Times, Abebi I; Space Around Daily Times, Abebi II; St. Mary Catholic School I; St. Mary Catholic School II; St. Mary Catholic School III; St. Patrick School, Abebi I; St. Patrick School, Abebi II
Ibadan North West	Ward 7 Nw4	Arena Club, Lemomu Street I; Arena Club, Lemomu Street II; In Front Akinsanmi's House, Ekotedo I; In Front Akinsanmi's House, Ekotedo II; In Front Of Oni's House, Ekotedo I; In Front Of Oni's House, Ekotedo II; In Front Of Queens Cinema, Ekotedo I; In Front Of Queens Cinema, Ekotedo II; Iya Olobe Junction; Late Baale Omole's House Idi-Oro; Open Space Idi-Oro, Ekotedo; Opposite Agip Petrol Station, Oke Padre; U. N. A. School, Ekotedo I; U. N. A. School, Ekotedo II
Ibadan North West	Ward 8 Nw5	At Ladeji's Compound Nalende; Ayo Olu Printing Press I; Ayo Olu Printing Press II; Baptist School, Nalende; Ebenezer Primary School I; Ebenezer Primary School II; Near Joseph's Primary School; Open Space Nalende Road (Ode Oolo); Open Space Oju Abere; Sacred Heart Convent School, Nalende; Space At Atowoda Nalede I; Space At Atowoda Nalende II; Space At Omitowoju I; Space At Omitowoju II; Space Near Maternity Centre; St. Joseph's Primary School
Ibadan North West	Ward 9 Nw6	Along Akintola Road; Around Afonta Layout Onireke; In Front Of Saviour Apostolic Akintola Road I; In Front Of Saviour Apostolic Akintola Road II; Methodist School Akintola Road, Ekotedo; Open Space Beside Lekan Salami Amusement Park; Open Space Shalom Nursery School, Onireke; Saviour Apostolic Church, Akintola Road; Space Around Onireke Health Centre
Ibadan North West	Ward 10 Nw7	Alhaji Bello Street Mecho's Workshop; Along Animasaun Street; Along Barracks Road, Polo Junction; Along Dumoye Street; Along Fan Milk School Of Nursing Road; Along T. C. T. C. Road; Around Post Office Eleyele; Beside Isabel Private School; Eleyele Grammar School; Idi-Ope Eleyele Road (Right Side); Idi-Ope Market Eleyele; Space At School's Board Jericho I; Space At School Board, Jericho II; St. Richard Primary School, Jericho; Yusuf Avenue Junction Nihort Road
Ibadan North West	Ward 11 Nw7	Aba Idi Osan; Along Animasaun Street, Babalegba; Anwar-Ul-Islam Grammar School; Anwar-Ul-Islam Primary School; Garrage Near Aska Paint; In Front Of Anwar-Ul-Islam Grammar School; In Front Of Anwar-Ul-Islam Primary School; Olopomewa Recreation Centre; Space Along Abibu Oki Street; Space Along Olopomewa B/Stop, Eleyele; Open Space Along Obokun Street; Space Around Arometa Junction; Space At Lister Area; Space Beside Oluseyi Bus Stop; Space Beside's The Car Wash Area; Space Opp. Water Works
Ibadan South-East	C1	Opposite Oranyan Mat. Centre; Ayorinde's Compound; Oleyo's Compound; Ago Seke/Esu Awele; Dada's Compound, Oja'Ba; Opposite Central Mosque, Oja'Ba; Mapo Court; Laamo's Compound; Oniro's Compound; Ogunmola's Compound; Mapo Health Centre
Ibadan South-East	S 1	Esu Awele; Ope Agbe Compound; Oluwo's Compound I; Oluwo's Compound II; Kure's Compound; Anla's Compound I; Anla's Compound II; Ile - Ode Isale Ijebu; Alesinloye Compound I; Alesinloye Compound II; Alesinloye Compound III; Lako's Compound I; Lako's Compound II; Lako's Compound III; Idi Arere Junction I; Idi Arere Junction II
Ibadan South-East	S 2a	Balogun Kobomoje Compound I; Balogun Kobomoje Compound II; Kobiowu's Palace Compound I; Kobiowu's Palace Compound II; Infront Of Basorun Fajinmi's Compound I; Infront Of Basorun Fajinmi's Compound II; Oranyan Fish Depot; Oranyan Maternity Centre
Ibadan South-East	S. 2b	Beside Balogun Kobomoje I; Beside Balogun Kobomoje II; Outer Space Near Balogun Kobomoje; Bada' S Compound; Opposite Ojolowo Bakery; Public Day School Kobomoje I; Public Day School Kobomoje II; Open Space Near Kobomoje School I; Open Space Near Kobomoje School II
Ibadan South-East	S 3	Agbongbon Maternity Centre I; Agbongbon Maternity Centre II; Olufunmilayo Maternity Centre I; Olufunmilayo Maternity Centre II; Oyetunde's Palace I; Oyetunde's Palace II; Lanioka's Compound I; Lanioka's Compound II; Ita Ege I; Ita Ege II; Ariori's Compound; Ita Olukoyi I; Ita Olukoyi II
Ibadan South-East	S 4a	Wesley Campus I; Wesley Campus II; Wesley Campus III; Open Space At Olubi I; Open Space At Olubi II; Ile Orita Junction I; Ile Orita Junction II; Opposite Asanke Idi-Aro I; Opposite Asanke Idi-Aro II; Police Station, Idi-Aro I; Police Station, Idi-Aro II; Idi-Aro Mat. Centre I; Idi-Aro Mat. Centre II; C. A. C. Eleta I; C. A. C. Eleta II; Beside Adebolu Mosque I; Beside Adebolu Mosque II; Near Arabic Institution, Modina I; Near Arabic Institution, Modina II; Open Space At Modina I; Open Space At Modina II; Public Day School, Elekuro I; Public Day School, Elekuro II; Public Day School, Elekuro III; Open Space At Ayedade, Elekuro I; Open Space At Ayedade, Elekuro II; Open Space At Ayedade, Elekuro III; Open Space Along Ayedade Elukuro IV
Ibadan South-East	S 4b	C. A. C. Grammar School, Oniyere I; C. A. C. Grammar School, Oniyere II; C. A. C. Grammar School, Oniyere III; Aperin Oniyere Grammar School I; Aperin Oniyere Grammar School II; Open Space Near Grammar School I; Open Space Near Grammar School II; Outer Premises Adesola I; Outer Premises Adesola II; I. M. G. School, Olubadan I; I. M. G. School, Olubadan II
Ibadan South-East	S S5	Oyapidan Primary School, Owode I; Oyapidan Primary School, Owode II; Open Space Near Oyapidan School III; Owode Market, Olomi I; Owode Market, Olomi II; In Front Of Eleta High School I; In Front Of Eleta High School II; Open Space Near Eleta High School I; Open Space Near Eleta High School II; Opposite Ile Tuntun Motor Park I; Opposite Ile Tuntun Motor Park II; Christ School, Mapo, Odinjo I; Christ School, Mapo, Odinjo II; Open Space Near Christ School, Odinjo I; Open Space Near Christ School, Odinjo II; Beside Fish Depot, Eleta I; Beside Fish Depot, Eleta II; Beside Sodun Hospital, Odinjo I; Beside Sodun Hospital, Odinjo II; Ode Akano I; Ode Akano II; Ratibi School I; Ratibi School II; Open Space Near Ratibi School; Near Alhaji Muibi's House II; Ode Akano Express Odinjo; Idi Igi Sango I; Idi Igi Sango II; Near Mogaji Kupolu's House; In Front Of Alake's W/Shop I; In Front Of Alake's W/Shop II; Adelagun Mem. School, Odinjo I; Adelagun Mem. School, Odinjo II; Open Space Near Adelagun School I; Open Space Near Adelagun School II; Open Space Near Adelagun School III; Kajola Irede Odinjo I; Kajola Irede Odinjo II; Open Space At Obisesan I; Open Space At Obisesan II; Open Space At Omilabu Layout I; Open Space At Omilabu Layout II; Open Space At Ogunsola; Idi Ita Open Space I; Idi Ita Open Space II
Ibadan South-East	S 6a	Opposite Kudeti Church I; Opposite Kudeti Church II; Olunloyo Road I; Olunloyo Road II; Olubi's Road; I. M. G. School 1 Eleta I; I. M. G. School 1 Eleta II; Alli's House; Tewogbade's House; Adegoke Adelabu I; Adegoke Adelabu II; Oluokun's Compound; Former Beta Hospital; Yinbo's Fashion Centre
Ibadan South-East	S. 6b	Ilupeju Junction I; Ilupeju Junction II; Open Space At Odo Oba Junction I; Open Space At Odo Oba Junction II; Open Space At Odo Oba Junction III; St. Eunan's School, Odo Oba I; St. Eunan's School, Odo Oba II; St. Eunan's School, Odo Oba III; Open Space At Odo Oba Elere I; Open Space At Odo Oba Elere II; Odi Olowo St. Odo Oba Elere I; Odi Olowo St. Odo Oba Elere II; Idi Obi Layout Elere I; Idi Obi Layout Elere II; In Front Of Ekolo's House I; In Front Of Ekolo's House II; In Front Of Ekolo's House III; Open Space Near Adedoja's House I; Open Space Near Adedoja's House II; Court Road, Ile Tuntun I; Court Road, Ile Tuntun II; Court Road, Ile Tuntun III; Fish Depot, Ile Tuntun I; Fish Depot, Ile Tuntun II; Isola Ogunsola Junction, Academy I; Isola Ogunsola Junction, Academy II; Isola Ogunsola Junction, Academy III; Open Space At Owode Academy I; Open Space At Owode Academy II; Open Space At Owode Academy III; I. M. G. School II, Eleta I; I. M. G. School II, Eleta II; I. M. G. School II, Eleta III; I. M. G. School II, Eleta IV; St. John's School, Eleta I; St. John's School, Eleta II; St. John's School, Eleta III; St. John's School, Eleta IV
Ibadan South-East	S 7a	St. Luke's School, Molete I; St. Luke's School, Molete II; I. M. G. School, Kudeti I; I. M. G. School, Kudeti II; Islamic School, Kudeti I; Islamic School, Kudeti II; St. David's School, Kudeti; Open Space Near St. David School I; Open Space Near St. David School II; Outer Space Near St. David School I; Outer Space Near St. David School II; Islamic Mission School I; Islamic Mission School II; In Front Of Odeku Compound; In Front Of Solaja's House; Outer Space Near Solaja; Beside Ola Mummy I; Beside Ola Mummy II; Near Mola Hospital I; Near Mola Hospital II; Opposite Odi Olowo Odo-Oba I; Opposite Odi Olowo Odo-Oba II; C. A. C. Oke Agbara I; C. A. C. Oke Agbara II; Adeyemo Lay-Out I; Adeyemo Lay-Out II; Yejide Gramm. School I; Yejide Gramm. School II; Ayodele Primary School I; Ayodele Primary School II; Open Space At Odo-Oba Junction I; Open Space At Odo-Oba Junction II; K & S. Aladura I; K & S. Aladura II; Boluwaji Elere; Open Space At Sanyo I; Open Space At Sanyo II; Ajet Araromi Lay-Out I; Ajet Araromi Lay-Out II; Ibadan Grammar School; Open Space At Molete; Open Space Opposite Sogoye
Ibadan South-East	S 7b	I. M. G. Ibuko I; I. M. G. Ibuko II; I. M. G. Ibuko III; I. M. G. Ibuko IV; Open Space Along Aluko I; Open Space Along Aluko II; Aluko Street Felele I; Aluko Street Felele II; Eyini High School I; Eyini High School II; Adelabu Shopping Complex I; Adelabu Shopping Complex II; Adelabu Shopping Complex III; Adelabu Shopping Complex IV; Felele Chemist I; Felele Chemist II; Felele Rab I; Felele Rab II; Open Space Along Felele Straight I; Open Space Along Felele Straight II; Open Space Along Felele Straight III; Open Space Along Felele Straight IV; Lam Adesina Junction, Labe-Odan I; Lam Adesina Junction, Labe-Odan II; Lam Adesina Junction, Labe-Odan III; Open Space Onibonoje; Open Space Near Onibonoje; Scout Camp Olorunsogo; Scout Camp I; Scout Camp II; Falana Mobil Station I; Falana Mobil Station II
Ibadan South West	Ward 1 C2	Olupoyi Comp. Oja-Oba I; Olupoyi Comp. Oja-Oba II; Olupoyi Comp. Oja-Oba III; Olupoyi Comp. Oja-Oba IV; Akere Compound I; Akere Compound II; Akere Compound III; Akere Compound IV; Former Rational Bookshop I; Former Rational Bookshop II; In Front Of Late Oba Akinyele I; In Front Of Late Oba Akinyele II; Olanihun's Compound I; Olanihun's Compound II; Olanihun's Compound III; Oriolowo Compound I; Oriolowo Compound II; Fijabi Compound I; Fijabi Compound II; Fijabi Compound III; Fijabi Compound IV; Onisiniyan Compound I; Onisiniyan Compound II; Olaniyan Compound I; Olaniyan Compound II; Olaniyan Compound III; Alekuso Compound I; Alekuso Compound II; Alekuso Compound III; Ile Eja Bere I; Ile Eja Bere II; Ile Eja Bere III
Ibadan South West	Ward 2 Sw1	Progressive Day School, Aladorin I; Progressive Day School, Aladorin II; Progressive Day School, Aladorin III; Progressive Day School, Aladorin IV; Christ Gospel (Progressive Aladorin) I; Christ Gospel (Progressive Aladorin) II; Christ Gospel (Ile Ege); Open Space Behind Progressive I; Open Space Behind Progressive II; Open Space Behind Progressive III; Open Space At Aregbe's Compound; Elesin Meta Compound I; Elesin Meta Compound II; Open Space At Apanpa Compound I; Open Space At Apanpa Compound II; Open Space At Apanpa Compound III; Open Space At Apanpa Compound IV; Open Space At Apanpa Compound V; Open Space Along Isale Osi Road I; Open Space Along Isale Osi Road II; Open Space Along Isale Osi Road III; Open Space Iyalode I; Open Space Iyalode II; Open Space Iyalode III; Born Photo Along Oja'Ba Road (Kobi); Open Space Ebu Adajo Compound I; Open Space Ebu Adajo Compound II; Born Photo Along Gege Road I; Born Photo Along Gege Road II; Born Photo Along Gege Road III; Olola Compound I; Olola Compound II
Ibadan South West	Ward 3 Sw2	Open Space At Sobaloju Isale Ijebu I; Open Space At Sobaloju Isale Ijebu II; Open Space At Sobaloju Isale Ijebu III; Open Space Near Ida Compound I; Open Space Near Ida Compound II; Open Space Near Ida Compound III; Open Space At Ita Okoro Compound; Open Space At Opere's Compound I; Open Space At Opere's Compound II; Open Space At Olowoake Compound I; Open Space At Olowoake Compound II; Open Space At Olukosi Compound I; Open Space At Olukosi Compound II; Open Space At Ita-Aregbeomo
Ibadan South West	Ward 4 Sw3a & 3b	Alukoso Compound I; Alukoso Compound II; Gbodu Compound I; Gbodu Compound II; Akuro Popo Yemoja I; Akuro Popo Yemoja II; Open Space At Kajola I; Open Space At Kajola II; Asuni Compound I; Asuni Compound II; Ilana Compound I; Ilana Compound II; Ilana Compound III; Igbona Compound I; Igbona Compound II; Igbona Compound III; Onigba Compound I; Onigba Compound II; Onigba Compound III; Bode Market I; Bode Market II; Bode Market III; Bode Market IV
Ibadan South West	Ward 5 Sw4	S. D. A. School, Foko; Open Space At Asaka I; Open Space At Asaka II; Open Space At Asaka III; Akuro Oke Foko I; Akuro Oke Foko II; Oredehin Area Foko I; Oredehin Area Foko II; Baoku Primary School, Foko I; Baoku Primary School, Foko II; Open Space Ebo Olobi I; Open Space Ebo Olobi II; Open Space At Oloni Compound; Open Space At Oloni Compound Agbeni; Open Space At Otuntajo Foko I; Open Space At Otuntajo Foko II; Open Space Itasaku I; Open Space Itasaku II; Christ Gospel School, Foko; Open Space At Apena Gege; Open Space At Alagbede I; Open Space At Alagbede II; C. A. C. School, Akuro I; C. A. C. School, Akuro II; Open Space At Itamaya; Open Space At Otesuku; A. U. D. Primary School, Foko I; A. U. D. Primary School, Foko II
Ibadan South West	Ward 6 Sw5	Itamaya Compound, Okefoko I; Itamaya Compound, Okefoko II; Adesope Compound, Oke Foko I; Adesope Compound, Foko II; Odulaja Compound, Foko; Bale Compound, Foko I; Bale Compound, Foko II; Bale Compound, Foko III; Oho's Compound, Foko I; Oho's Compound, Foko II; Amule Compound, Foko; Abiola Jacob Primary School I; Abiola Jacob Primary School II; Abiola Jacob Primary School III; Abiola Jacob Primary School IV; Open Space At Jascolly I; Open Space At Jascolly II; Ekere Compound I; Ekere Compound II
Ibadan South West	Ward 7 Sw6	Agbokojo/Okanto; Odunsi; Open Space At Ajimati Agbeni; Methodist Primary School, Agbeni I; Methodist Primary School, Agbeni II; Amunigun Compound I; Amunigun Compound II; Open Space At Amule Agbokojo I; Open Space At Amule Agbokojo II; Asa Compound, Foko I; Asa Compound, Foko II; Labaowo Ogunpa I; Labaowo Ogunpa II; Labaowo Ogunpa III; Labaowo Ogunpa IV; Open Space In Front Of Agbokojo Compound I; Open Space In Front Of Agbokojo Compound II; Open Space At Osoba/Falola I; Open Space At Osoba/Falola II
Ibadan South West	Ward 08 Sw7	I. M. G. School Board, Iyaganku I; I. M. G. School Board, Iyaganku II; I. M. G. School Board, Iyaganku III; I. M. G. School Board, Iyaganku IV; General Post Office, Dugbe I; General Post Office, Dugbe II; I. M. G. Sharp Corner I; I. M. G. Sharp Corner II; Open Space At Olatunbosun Street I; Open Space At Olatunbosun Street II; Around Police Station, Iyaganku I; Around Police Station, Iyaganku II; Around Police Station, Iyaganku III; Open Space At Adebimpe; Open Space At Gbagi; Former British Council, Dugbe I; Former British Council, Dugbe II; Former British Council, Dugbe III; Dental Centre, Dugbe I; Dental Centre, Dugbe II; Dental Centre, Dugbe III; Open Space At Gbagi Mosque I; Open Space At Gbagi Mosque II; Ibadan Boys High School I; Ibadan Boys High School II; Ibadan Boys High School III; S. D. A. School, Oke Bola I; S. D. A. School, Oke Bola II; S. D. A. School, Oke Bola III; St. James Primary School, Oke Bola I; St. James Primary School, Oke Bola II; St. James Primary School, Oke Bola III
Ibadan South West	Ward 9 Sw8 (1)	In Front Of Daily Times Office I; In Front Of Daily Times Office II; Open Space At Ajengbe; Open Space At Sodende I; Open Space At Sodende II; Open Space Near Anfani I; Open Space Near Anfani II; Open Space Near Anfani III; Open Space Near Anfani IV; Open Space At Idi Odo I; Open Space At Idi Odo II; Open Space At Tax Office I; Open Space At Tax Office II; Open Space At Lemmy House I; Open Space At Lemmy House II; Children Home School I; Children Home School II; Ratibi Muslim Primary School, Molete; St. John's Primary School, Molete I; St. John Primary School, Molete II; St. John Primary School, Molete III; People's Gram. School, Molete I; People's Gram. School, Molete II; People's Gram. School, Molete III; People's Gram. School, Molete IV; I. M. G. Primary School, Molete I; I. M. G. Primary School, Molete II; Open Space College Crescent (Oluseyi); Open Space At College Crescent; Open Space At Lodge Street I; Open Space At Lodge Street II; A. U. D. Primary School, Ososami I; A. U. D. Primary School, Ososami II; A. U. D. Primary School, Ososami III; A. U. D. Primary School, Ososami IV; Methodist Primary School, Oke Ado I; Methodist Primary School, Oke Ado II; Open Space At Adejinle I; Open Space At Adejinle II; Open Space At Adejinle III; Open Space At Ayankoya I; Open Space At Ayankoya II; Open Space At Idi Ope I; Open Space At Idi Ope II; Open Space At Ayegbusi I; Open Space At Ayegbusi II; Open Space At Nigerian Tribune I; Open Space At Nigerian Tribune II; St. Anthony Primary School, Molete I; St. Anthony Primary School, Molete II
Ibadan South West	Ward 10 Sw8 II	St. James Primary School, Oke Ado I; St. James Primary School, Oke Ado II; I. M. G. Primary School, Oke Ado I; I. M. G. Primary School, Oke Ado II; Open Space Oke Ado Market I; Open Space Oke Ado Market II; Open Space Oke Ado Market III; Open Space Near A. P. Station, Okeado; Oke-Ado High School I; Oke-Ado High School II; Open Space At Cuso Area I; Open Space At Cuso Area II; Open Space At Adegoke Street I; Open Space At Adegoke Street II; Baptist Sec. School, Oke Ado I; Baptist Sec. School, Oke Ado II; In Front Of Liberty Stadium I; In Front Of Liberty Stadium II; Open Space At Star Gate I; Open Space At Star Gate II; Open Space At Star Gate III; Ladega's Compound, Oke Ado I; Ladega's Compound, Oke Ado II; Saba Saba Open Space I; Saba Saba Open Space II; St. Williams School, Oke Ado I; St. Williams School, Oke Ado II; Youth Centre, Oke Ado I; Youth Centre, Oke Ado II; Youth Centre, Oke Ado III; Ebenezer School, Oke Ado I; Ebenezer School, Oke Ado II; Ebenezer School, Oke Ado III; Open Space At Agbara Compound I; Open Space At Agbara Compound II
Ibadan South West	Ward 11 Sw9(1)	Kitoye Lodge I; Kitoye Lodge II; Elewura Comm. Grammar School I; Elewura Comm. Grammar School II; Elewura Comm. Grammar School III; Elewura Comm. Grammar School IV; Texaco Filling Station I; Texaco Filling Station II; Open Space Beside Nepa I; Open Space Beside Nepa II; Open Space Beside Nepa III; Open Space, Passport Office I; Open Space, Passport Office II; Open Space, Passport Office III; Open Space, Passport Office IV; People's Primary School, Adeoyo Road I; People's Primary School, Adeoyo Road II; Comm. Grammar School, Oluyole Estate I; Comm. Grammar School, Oluyole Estate II; Comm. Grammar School, Oluyole Estate III; Comm. Grammar School, Oluyole Estate IV; Basorun Ogunmola High School I; Basorun Ogunmola High School II; Open Space Oni & Sons
Ibadan South West	Ward 12 Sw9 II	Akinyemi Way Ring Road I; Akinyemi Way Ring Road II; Open Space Ago Taylor I; Open Space Ago Taylor II; Open Space Ago Taylor III; Open Space Ago Taylor IV; Our Lady Of Apostle I; Our Lady Of Apostle II; Our Lady Of Apostle III; Open Space Araromi Odo Ona I; Open Space Araromi Odo Ona II; Open Space Araromi Odo Ona III; Opposite Mary Way, Odo Ona I; Opposite Mary Way, Odo Ona II; Open Space Okeayo, Odo Ona I; Open Space Okeayo, Odo Ona II; Sacred Heart Primary School, Okeayo; C. K. C. Primary School, Odo Ona I; C. K. C. Primary School, Odo Ona II; C. K. C. Primary School, Odo Ona III; Open Space At Desalu Street I; Open Space At Desalu Street II; Open Space At Desalu Street III; Open Space At Adeogun Street; Open Space At Kuole I; Open Space At Kuole II; Open Space At Adeola Street; St. Paul School, Odo Ona I; St. Paul School, Odo Ona II; St. Paul School, Odo Ona III; Eleja Primary School, Odo Ona I; Eleja Primary School, Odo Ona II; Eleja Primary School, Odo Ona III; Iart Gate I; Iart Gate II; Bcj Bus Stop; Open Space At Gci Apata I; Open Space At Gci Apata II; Open Space At Inaolaji; Customary Court, Apata I; Customary Court, Apata II; Customary Court, Apata III; Open Space At Olurin Close I; Open Space At Olurin Close II; Adifase High School I; Adifase High School II; Adi Fase High School III; Ada Beji I; Ada Beji II; Open Space Apata Market I; Open Space Apata Market II; Open Space Aba Alamu I; Open Space Aba Alamu II; Open Space Aba Alamu III; Open Space At Johnson Awe I; Open Space At Johnson Awe II; Open Space At Alexander; Open Space At Kuola Adedayo; Apata Grammar School I; Apata Grammar School II; Open Space At Akinrefon I; Open Space At Akinrefon II; Open Space At Owode Garage I; Open Space At Owode Garage II; Open Space At Owode Garage III; Open Space At Erinkojaobe; Open Space At Gbekuba I; Open Space At Gbekuba II; Open Space At Gbekuba III; Open Space At Bora Area; Open Space At Wema Bank, Apata I; Open Space At Wema Bank, Apata II; Oluyole Extension High School I; Oluyole Extension High School II; Oluyole Extension High School III; Open Space Railway Quarters I; Open Space Railway Quarters II; Open Space Idi Ishin I; Open Space Idi Ishin II; Open Space Tanimowo Bus Stop I; Open Space Tanimowo Bus Stop II
Ibarapa Central	Idere I (Molete)	Town Hall I; Town Hall II; Town Hall III; Alapinnin Compound I; Alapinnin Compound II; Alapinnin Compound III; Alapinnin Compound IV; Tobalogbo Village; Osumare Village; Tuture Village; Jagun Village I; Jagun Village II; L. A. School, Origi; Gbongbon Village; Oba Village; Dagbere Village
Ibarapa Central	Idere II (Ominigbo/Oke - Oba)	Kajola Market Area I; Kajola Market Area II; Kajola Market Area III; Oba Market Area I; Oba Market Area II; Oba Market Area III; Oba Market Area IV
Ibarapa Central	Idere III (Koso/Apa)	Islamic School, Koso I; Islamic School, Koso II; Islamic School, Koso III; Islamic School, Koso IV; Motor Park I; Motor Park II
Ibarapa Central	Iberekodo I /(Pataoju)	Ita Oluwo I; Ita Oluwo II; Ita Oluwo III; Ita Oluwo IV; Ita Oluwo V; Ita Oluwo VI; Towobowo Market, Alamala I; Towobowo Market, Alamala II; Onipepe Compound; Geke Village; Imekele; Sekere/Geke Village
Ibarapa Central	Iberekodo/Agbooro/Ita Baale	Ayannagi; Aborikura I; Aborikura II; Aborikura; Motor Park, Ayelabogo I; Motor Park, Ayelabogo II; Towobowo Market I; Towobowo Market II; Baba Oyo/Panpala; Baba Oyo; Akeroro Village
Ibarapa Central	Idofin Isaganun	Ibona Elewuro; A. U. D. Sagan-Un; A. U. D. School, Sagan-Un/Ogunmolu; Methodist School, Oke Agogo; Methodist School, Oke Agogo (Idi Sanga); L. A. School Idofin; L. A. School, Idofin (Opanike}; The Apostolic School I; The Apostolic School II; The Apostolic School III; The Apostolic School IV; Aro Compound I; Aro Compound II
Ibarapa Central	Igbole/Pako	A. U. D. School, Ita Otoopo I; A. U. D. School, Ita Otoopo II; A. U. D. School, Ita Otoopo III; A. U. D. School, Ita Otoopo IV; A. U. D. School, Ita Ladoke I; A. U. D. School, Ita Ladoke II; A. U. D. School, Ita Ladoke III; Baptist School II, Pako (Araromi); Baptist School II, Pako (Abesin); Lapampa Compound, Odofin Laona; Lapampa Compound; Kumolu (Elerankaju) I; Kumolu (Elerankaju) II; Kumolu Great Mother I; Kumolu Great Mother II; Pako Market I; Pako Market II; Kasali Onilu; Kasali Onilu, Akonikoro; Kasali Onilu, Asejanna; African Church School, Ogunbi; African Church School
Ibarapa Central	Isale-Oba	Bansa Village; Araromi Village; Jagode Compound; Jagode Compound, Methodist Mission I; Jagode Compound, Methodist Mission II; Jagode Compound, Ajegunle Market; Jagode Compound, Tebelu; Jagode Compound, Atokora; Ita Elegun, Ajiro Compound I; Ita Elegun, Olukosi Compound II; Ita Elegun, Iyalode Compound III; Ita Elegun, Onilekun; Baaro Market; Baaro Market, Elewi Odo; Baaro Market, Amugangan; Fedegbo Village; Ogundele Village; Onile Village; Onile Village, Baba Gbau
Ibarapa Central	Okeserin I & II	Obatade Village; Obatade Village (Abukele); Olupira Compound, (Open Space); Olupira Compound, (Giri); Olupira Compound, (Akogun); Court Hall, Lasele; Court Hall, Ayankoso, Ayerinna; Olukotun Compound; Olukotun Compound (Otaobola); Ajegunle Market; Ajegunle Market (Alagbaa Tejumade); Baptist School I, Ojanba; Baptist School, Onikeke; C. A. C. Onilado (Arigbeyo) I; C. A. C. Onilado (Ogongo) I; C. A. C. Onilado; C. A. C. Onilado (Market); Oniyeri Compound, Ajibesin I; Oniyeri Compound, Ajibesin II; Oniyeri Compound, Aregbesola; Ajana Orita; Ajana Orita, Asorolu; Ajana Orita, Apongba
Ibarapa Central	Oke-Odo	N. U. D. School II; Methodist School, Akange I; Methodist School, Akange II; Methodist School II, Ita Idowu; Methodist School, Akange; Agbede Ita Olukotun I; Agbede Ita Olukotun II; Ita Elesin; Dudu/Arunle
Ibarapa East	Oke -Oba	Alapinni Compound I; Alapinni Compound II; Asalu Compound I; Asalu Compound II; Abolonko Compound I; Abolonko Compound II; Abolonko Compound III; L. A. School I, Eruwa I; L. A. School I, Eruwa II; L. A. School I, Eruwa III; Towobowo Market I; Towobowo Market II; L. A. Road I (Agele); L. A. Road II (Alajuba); Olukotun Compound I; Olukotun Compound II; Ijesa Village
Ibarapa East	Anko	Town Hall, Anko Eruwa I; Town Hall, Anko Eruwa II; Town Hall, Anko Eruwa III; Town Hall, Anko Eruwa IV; Ajisafe Compound I; Ajisafe Compound II; Isale Elesin; Kamonis Area; Agiris Compound; Opposite Alayande; Opete Compound; Alayande Area; Oga Compound I; Oga Compound II; Ajibade Compound; Agbede Compound
Ibarapa East	Aborerin	African School, Eruwa I; African School, Eruwa II; African School, Eruwa III; Bareke Quarters I; Bareke Quarters II; Fuleni Compound I; Fuleni Compound II; Aturu Compound I; Aturu Compound II; Aturu Compound III; Oke-Ola Junction I; Oke-Ola Junction II; Oke-Ola Junction III; Elewunla Compound I; Elewunla Compound II; Agboye Compound
Ibarapa East	New Eruwa	L. A. School I, New Eruwa; Motor Park, New Eruwa I; Motor Park, New Eruwa II; Maternity Centre New Eruwa I; Maternity Centre New Eruwa II; Adedeji Compound New Eruwa I; Adedeji Compound New Eruwa II; Dawodu Village; Oke-0ba House New Eruwa I; Oke-0ba House New Eruwa II; L. A. School, Lagaye II; Olori Village
Ibarapa East	Oke-Imale	Oya Eggun Compound; Eleti Compound; Odofin Compound I; Odofin Compound II; Bioku Compound I; Bioku Compound II; Open Space Bioku Area; Odeku Compound; Alubata Compound; Oniwani Compound I; Oniwani Compound II; Iyalode Compound; Community Primary School, Ilado
Ibarapa East	Isale Togun	Adio Compound; Koonu Compound; Jagun Compound; Baptist School, Lanlate I; Baptist School, Lanlate II; Baptist School, Lanlate III; Baptist School, Maya; Ipa Compound, Maya; Community Primary School, Akeete; L. A. School, Langaye I; Isale Togun Market; Nitel Quarters - Frontage
Ibarapa East	Oke Otun	Town Hall, Lanlate I; Town Hall, Lanlate II; Obe Compound; Abolonko Compound; Otun Compound I; Otun Compound II; Ogodu Compound; Ajadi Compound; Agbokoro Compound; Community School, Owode; Aawo Village; Areago Village; Alaarun Compound; Okutalogun Compound
Ibarapa East	Itabo	Onitabo Frontage; Surulere Street; Asunnara Compound I; Asunnara Compound II; Paje Compound; Alagbede Compound; Oluwo Compound; African Church School, Igbodudu; Abule Onitabo; Olohunde Village; Gaadi Village; African Church School, Alapa I; African Church School, Alapa II; Adeyemi Village
Ibarapa North	Ayete I	Asawo I; Asawo II; Eleti Compound; Eleja Compound; Babamogba; Alabere; Community Hall I; Community Hall II; Community Hall III; Community Hall IV; Imofin Mosque I; Imofin Mosque II; Imofin Mosque III; Bale Kaa
Ibarapa North	Ayete II	Odoode I; Odoode II; Oke-Ogun I; Oke-Ogun II; Molete I; Molete II; Molete III; Motor Park I; Motor Park II; Motor Park III; Motor Park IV; Motor Park V; Olokuta I; Olokuta II; Olokuta III; Olokuta IV; Olokuta V
Ibarapa North	Igangan I	Community Hall I; Community Hall II; Community Hall III; Community Hall IV; Community Hall V; Motor Park I; Motor Park II; Motor Park III; Motor Park IV; Elegbaada I; Elegbaada II; Methodist School I (A); Methodist School I (B); A. U. D. Quarters
Ibarapa North	Igangan II	Towobowo Market; Towobowo Market Olodeoku; Towobowo Market Ikokoogun; Towobowo Market Elemosin; Towobowo Market Ipadeola; Kulo Quarters Ojelola House; Baptist School II (A) Isale Akao; Baptist School II (B) Isale Akao; Bada Compound Area Titilope's House; Bada Compound Area Oshin's House; Olokuta Compound Area Mosque; Olokuta Compound Area Oyeniyi House
Ibarapa North	Igangan III	Babamogba Quarters; Koleye Quarters; Olori Ode Quarters; R. C. M. I (A); R. C. M. I (B); Oke Ola Market I; Oke Ola Market II; Oke Ola Market III; Balogun Compound Area I; Balogun Compound Area II; Ara Oje Oke Ola; Aromaye Compound I; Aromaye Compound II; Aromaye Compound III; Aromaye Compound IV; Eleti Asaoku Compound Area I; Eleti Asaoku Compound Area II
Ibarapa North	Igangan IV	Igitele Compound Area I; Igitele Compound Area II; Igitele Compound Area III; Igitele Compound Area IV; Baba Oyo Compound Area I; Baba Oyo Compound Area II; Ara Oje Compound Area I; Ara Oje Compound Area II; Asaluwala Compound Area I; Asaluwala Compound Area II
Ibarapa North	Ofiki I	Bello Village I; Bello Village II; Oyee Village I; Oyee Village II; Sando Village; Obape Village I; Obape Village II; Okebi Village; Alabi Village I; Alabi Village II; Alabi Village III; Alagbaa Market I; Alagbaa Market II; Gbangbangere I; Gbangbangere II; Sangodare Village I; Sangodare Village II; Konko Village I; Konko Village II; Opomu Village; Sangote Village; Agboba Village
Ibarapa North	Ofiki II	L. A. School, Asunnara I; L. A. School, Asunnara II; Commercial School, Bogunmbe; Ominigbo Village; Akoya Village I; Akoya Village II; Akoya Village III; Baptist School, Idiyan I; Baptist School, Idiyan II; Baptist School, Idiyan III; Abule Elede; Abidioki Village
Ibarapa North	Tapa I	Magbagbe's Shop Frontage I; Magbagbe's Shop Frontage II; Magbagbe's Shop Frontage III; Magbagbe's Shop Frontage IV; Community Hall I; Community Hall II; Community Hall III; Community Hall IV; Community Hall V; Baale Ikogba I; Baale Ikogba II; Baale Ikogba III; Baale Ikogba IV; Baale Ana I; Baale Ana II; Baale Ana III; Baale Ana IV
Ibarapa North	Tapa II	Oniwafin I; Oniwafin II; Methodist School I; Methodist School II; Methodist School III; Methodist School IV; Alapapo I; Alapapo II; Alapapo III; Alapapo IV
Ido	Aba Emo/Ilaju/Alako	Ilaju Open Space; Open Space Aba Emo; Onifufuu Comm. Primary School; Alako Open Space; Eleyele Open Space
Ido	Akufo/Idigba/Araromi	Open Space Abigbinde; Saint Mathew Primary School, Akufo; Open Space Alajata; Open Space Latayo; Open Space Oko Esu; Comm. Primary School, Araromi
Ido	Akinware/Akindele	Primary School, Akindele; Primary School, Elesinfunfun; Open Space Olokogboro; Open Space Onigbinde; Open Space, Akinware; Open Space Morakinyo
Ido	Apete/Ayegun/Awotan	Saint Peter School, Apete; Open Space, Apete; Open Space Agbaje; Primary School, Idi Oro Elewa; Open Space Idi Igbaro; I. D. C. Primary School, Awotan; Open Space, Oloro; Open Space, Odebode; Open Space, Onigbodogi; Open Space, Lawoyin; Open Space, Apete (Behind Transformer)
Ido	Batake/Idi-Iya	I. D. C. Primary School, Idi-Iya; Open Space, Onisago; Open Space, Batake; Open Space, Ladunni; Open Space, Sonso; Open Space, Abule Ayo; Open Space, Oloruntedo
Ido	Erinwusi/Koguo/Odetola	Baptist Primary School, Odetola; Open Space, Aba Oke; Open Space, Koguo; Primary School, Erinwusi; Open Space Araromi Idowu; Open Space, Latunji; Primary School, Fasan
Ido	Fenwa/Oganla/Elenusonso	Comm. High School, Elenusonso; Open Space, Odufemi; Open Space, Oloje; Primary School, Lasokun Araromi; Comm. Primary School, Oganla; Open Space Alafara; Open Space, Fenwa; Ogba-Gba Open Space
Ido	Ido/Onikede/Okuna Awo	N. U. D. Primary School, Ido; Court Hall, Ido; Onikede Primary School; Open Space, Okuna Awo
Ido	Omi Adio/Omi Onigbagbo Bakatari	Saint Andrew Primary School, Omi Adio I; Saint Andrew Primary School, Omi Adio II; Hope Central School, Omi Adio; Islamic Primary School, Omi Abidogun; Open Space Bode Igbo; I. D. C. Primary School, Erinkoja Obe; Christ Primary School, Bakatari; Open Space, Aba Araba; Primary School, Alakaso; Primary School, Omi Onigbagbo; Primary School, Open Space, Bako; Open Space Owode Estate
Ido	Ogundele/Alaho/Siba/Idi-Ahun	Open Space, Onidoko; Open Space, Balogun Alahusa; Open Space, Oke Alaro; Open Space, Ogundele Alaho; Primary School, Ateere; Siba Primary School, Siba; Oloko Open Space; Open Space Oloya; Idi Ahun Open Space; Ojimi Primary School; Primary School, Ajobo Ido; Open Space, Benbo; Open Space, Alexander
Irepo	Ajagunna	Baptist Primary School I; Baptist Primary School II; Baptist Primary School III; Molete Area I; Molete Area II; Gaa Tunkun
Irepo	Atipa	Ita Abijagun; Abijagun Premises; Ita Atipa I; Ita Atipa II; Ode Gbangba I; Ode Gbangba II; Igbo Elemi; Gudu Village
Irepo	Iba I	L. A. Primary School, Agede I; L. A. Primary School, Agede II; Ita Sagba; L. G. Dispensary I; L. G. Dispensary II; Adagbangba Village I; Adagbangba Village II; Budo Nla; Budo Awe; Budo Abu
Irepo	Iba II	Ita Dariagbon; Olorunsogo Market I; Olorunsogo Market II; Open Space In Front Alhaji Jimo Arowolo's House I; Open Space In Front Alhaji Jimo Arowolo's House II; Open Space In Front Alhaji Jimo Arowolo's House III; Idi Igba In Front Commissioner Sijuade's House
Irepo	Iba III	Lagbulu High School; Welewele Village; Gaa Asaju; Opposite Alaafia Tayo Clinic; L. A. Primary School, Atipa; Oko Oba; Aligbongbo Village
Irepo	Iba IV	Oke Mapo; Oju Popo; Ode Ogoriodo; Ode Are; Budo Igboho; Oniyeye Village
Irepo	Iba V	L, I. E.'s Office; A. U. D. Primary School I; A. U. D. Primary School II; Health Clinic, Tege; Budo Ibariba; Budo Ojetete; Ode Pupa
Irepo	Ikolaba	Ita Onasokun I; Ita Onasokun II; Ita Olodogbona I; Ita Olodogbona II; Ita Olodogbona III; Budo Sabi I; Budo Sabi II; Budo Megemu
Irepo	Laha/Ajana	Ita Otun I; Ita Otun II; Ita Otun III; Ode Koto; Kisi Community Grammar School; Ajetowa Village; Gaa Bonni Gando; L. G. Dispensary Sooro
Iseyin	Ado-Awaye	L. A. School, Odo-Ogun; Court Ha Ll, Ado-Awaye I; Court Hall, Ado-Awaye II; Maternity, Ado-Awaye I; Maternity, Ado-Awaye II; L. A. School, Ado-Awaye I; L. A. School, Ado-Awaye II; L. A. School, Ado-Awaye III; A. U. D. School, Oke-Aro I; A. U. D. School, Oke-Aro II; Oke-Ola Ado-Awaye; Community School, Ado-Awaye; Community School, Wasinmi; Community School, Oniko I; Community School, Oniko II; Oha Village; Oloore; Aboriso; Amolegbe; Baptist School, Iserin; Obanese; Aagba; L. A. School, Agelu
Iseyin	Akinwumi/Osoogun	Aba Paanu; Baale Sagbo Village; Akinwumi I; Akinwumi II; Aba Agba; Onikainkain I; Onikainkain II; Akinlabi Village; Ogboolasa I; Ogboolasa II; Osoogun I; Osoogun II; Araromi; Afoyasoro; Adegbola; Sagbo-Ile; Alado/Konti
Iseyin	Ekunle I	Court Hall; Kujifi; Agbede Oba; Eru-Oba; Ekerin/Ita-Yangi; Agbede Agbale; Ita Epo Market I; Ita Epo Market II; Itapo Elegusi; C. M. S. Okutapema; Elegede/C. M. S. Idi-Iroko; I. D. G. S. I; I. D. G. S. II; Community School, Odo-Ogun; Idi-Iya; Ajepero; Aba Olodo
Iseyin	Ekunle II	Ita Epo Onilu I; Ita Epo Onilu II; Basorun Isale I; Basorun Isale II; Ita Obele I; Ita Obele II; C. P. A. C. Odumini; Methodist School, Ago-Ijio; Isale Papa; Ajao Oloke Junction I; Ajao Oloke Junction II; C. P. A. C. Aladura; Anglican Primary School, Aba-Ibadan; L. A. School, Apenpe; Methodist School, Ogungbe I; Methodist School, Ogungbe II; Baptist School, Oke-Edu; Aaba Village; Ipowu Village; Lawure
Iseyin	Faramora	Oloogun-Ebi/Kanbura; Dunmoba; A. U. D. School, Atori; Imale-Nfalafia; Idi-Ose; Babadudu; Agbede Kango; Adabo Market I; Adabo Market II; Ode Ebu; Gbokoyi Village
Iseyin	Ijemba/Oke-Ola/Oke-Oja	Popo-Oloro/Idi-Oro I; Popo-Oloro/Idi-Oro III; Ode Okankan; Olorunsogo; Okaala/Baba Agba I; Okaala/Baba Agba II; Old Motor Park; Library; Ita-Oye I; Ita-Oye II; Agarawu I; Agarawu II; Isale Ago/Ijemba I; Isale Ago/Ijemba II
Iseyin	Isalu I	L. A. Demonstration School I; L. A. Demonstration School II; Anwar-Ul-Islam Primary School, Adeta; Anwar-Ul-Islam Primary School, Isoko I; Anwar-Ul-Islam Primary School, Isoko II; R. C. M. School, Isalu I; R. C. M. School, Isalu II; Bode Isalu; Balogun Oke; Ode Abese; Oju Baba; Oke Aro/Motor Park; Obokun Street
Iseyin	Isalu II	L. A. School, Itan I; L. A. School, Itan II; Olomu; Arowojede I; Arowojede II; Arowojede III; Olobo; Alayin; Abugaga; Balelayo; Igboro; Ikere; Agbede/Idi-Emi; Gboleya; Onitoto/Onbuwo; Community Primary School, Otiiri; Ibilekan/Olope Primary School; Alagogo/Ajape Primary School.
Iseyin	Koso I	Community Primary School, Koso; Ese Igbale; Yaara Market; Ajumoda; Babalawo; Olota/Alahoro; Dispensary Ayedun; Baptist Secondary Grammar School, Koso
Iseyin	Koso II	Baale Sagbo I; Baale Sagbo II; Jagun Market; Arowomole; Carpenter's Hall; Baptist Primary School, Koso
Iseyin	Ladogan/Oke Eyin	Idi-Iyalode; Akodudu; L. A. School, Oke-Esa I; L. A. School, Oke-Esa II; Olugbemi; Araromi Market I; Araromi Market II; N. U. D. School, Oluwole; Owner's Union; N. U. D. School, Olugbade; Sangote Village; Paago Pry Sch
Itesiwaju	Babaode	Post Office, Babaode I; Post Office, Babaode II; Oke Igbagbo; Baptist School, Babaode I; Baptist School, Babaode II; Asaju/Alaje/Olokopupo/Alaba; Alabata/Kongo/Akanni Bala, Olukosi; Kofo/Balode/Apata; Kosebija/Owode/Elepo/Ilepete; Ajibekuwo/Erupa/Aronpe
Itesiwaju	Igbojaiye	Dispensary, Igbojaiye I; Dispensary, Igbojaiye II; Apata Amosun; Sanga Village; Baptist School, Igbojaiye I; Baptist School, Igbojaiye II; Odo Omo/Ajebandele; Community School, Akowe Agbe; Sedikere/Adenlere
Itesiwaju	Ipapo	Baptist School, Ipapo I; Baptist School, Ipapo II; Library, Ipapo I; Library, Ipapo II; Farm Settlement/Seere; Community Market, Ipapo; Igbo Olosan/Budo Ayandokun; Isale Iwere; Budo Agoro/Oja Agoro
Itesiwaju	Komu	Baptist Sch, Komo; Court Hall, Komu; Adegbodu/Olopoto; Iferin/Ologede/Ilepo; Aba Otun; Olunlade; Community School, Atoogun; Community School, Temidire; Akoko/Koroyi
Itesiwaju	Okaka I	Sango Market, Okaka; Jagun O/S; Ekerin Area; Civil Court, Okaka I; Civil Court, Okaka II; Opoo Village; Abidogun Village; Okutalogun Village; Ire-Akari Village
Itesiwaju	Okaka II	Baptist School, Okaka; Idi-Ilekun; Ita Onilu; Budo Ore/Ladipo Village; Mokore Area; Maternity
Itesiwaju	Oke-Amu	L. A. School, Oke-Amu; Community Market, Oke-Amu I; Community Market, Oke Amu II; Isale Afa O/S; Ajelanwa Village; Alaganran Village; Adebayo Village
Itesiwaju	Otu 1	Cath. Primary School, Otu Town; N. U. D. School, Otu Town; Otun/Ayanhun O/S; Baptist School, Otu Town I; Baptist School, Otu Town II; Town Hall Otu Open Space; Bale Ayilola O/S; Alaga/Oniroko/Apata; Onijokun
Itesiwaju	Otu II	Ibise Community Primary School, Otu; Aroko O/S; Akankan I; Akankan II; Ajijobale O/S; Iwoye Community Primary School, Otu I; Iwoye Community Primary School, Otu II; Aba Paanu; Eleekan Village; Oke-Iye Village; Oniyanrin Village
Itesiwaju	Owode/Ipapo	Balogun Market, Ipapo I; Balogun Market, Ipapo II; Ita-Oba; Abegunrin Village; Idi-Emi/Mokolade/Erinte; Owode Village; Gbonkan Village; Aba Leke Village; Ahoro-Omo Village; Olaifa Atunbi
Iwajowa	Agbaakin I	Opposite Baptist Church, Igana I; Opposite Baptist Church, Igana II; First Baptist School, Igana; Olonu Compound, Igana; Agbaakin Compound I; Agbaakin Compound II; Motor Park; Opposite Motor Park; Abalake Compound I; Abalake Compound II; Community School, Idi-Ose
Iwajowa	Agbaakin II	Community Primary School, Ofeegun; Ofeegun Village, Igana I; Ofeegun Village, Igana II; Eleru Village, Igana; Community Primary School, Tudi; Tudi Village; Olomopupo Village; Ogbua Village; Ohori Village; L. A. School, Igana; Abowoyagba Village, Igana; Ajegunle Market; Community Primary School, Temidire; Aba Iseyin I; Aba Iseyin II; Alajuba Village; Olaiya Market
Iwajowa	Iwere-Ile I	Market Square, Iwere-Ile I; Market Square, Iwere-Ile II; Baptist School, Iwere-Ile I; Baptist School, Iwere-Ile II; Baptist School, Iwere-Ile III; R. C. M. School, Iwere-Ile; Dispensary, Iwere-Ile I; R. C. M. Agbaruru; Apata Village; Apakolo Village; Kokumo Village; Ogungbenle Village; A. U. D. School, Iwere-Ile; Epo Village; Dispensary, Iwere-Ile II
Iwajowa	Iwere-Ile II	Community School, Ayetoro-Ile; Market Square, Ayetoro-Ile; L. A. School, Idiko-Ago I; L. A. School, Idik0-Ago II; Olopele Village - Idiko-Ago; Baptist School, Itasa I; Market Square, Itasa I; Baptist School, Itasa II; Market Square, Itasa II; Gbedu Village I; Gbedu Village II; Aba Ibadan
Iwajowa	Iwere-Ile III	L. A. School, Ilaji-Ile; Maternity Centre, Ilaji-Ile; R. C. M. School, Idiko-Ile; Market Square, Idiko-Ile I; Market Square, Idiko-Ile II; Alayidan, Idiko-Ile
Iwajowa	Iwere-Ile IV	Ijio Primary School, Ijio I; Ijio Primary School, Ijio II; Ijio Primary School, Ijio III; Market Square, Ijio I; Market Square, Ijio II; Baptist School, Ijio I; Baptist School, Ijio II; Forekemi Alajuba; Okoko Village; R. C. M. Wasinmi I; R. C. M. Wasinmi II; Temidire Village; Oyewole Village; Laafin Village; Agboosun Village, Ijio
Iwajowa	Sabi Gana I	Ajimati Compound; Court Hall, Igana; Library, Igana I; Library, Igana II; Lemomu's Compound; Oba's Market; Abe Ipin Compound I; Abe Ipin Compound II; Health Office I; Health Office II
Iwajowa	Sabi Gana II	Balogun Abe Ipin, Igana I; Balogun Abe Ipin, Igana II; Catholic School, Igana; Aladura Village, Igana; Onikoro Village, Igana; Joloko Village; Imode Village, Igana
Iwajowa	Sabi Gana III	Ikia, Igana; Okuta Aka, Igana; Baale, Ikia I; Baale, Ikia II; Awerijaye; Ayede Market; Ayede Motor Park; Ago Compound; A. U. D. School, Igana; Bada Area, Igana I; Bada Area, Igana II; Okuta Apa, Igana
Iwajowa	Sabi Gana IV	Community Primary School, Elekokan I; Community Primary School, Elekokan II; Elekokan Village I; Elekokan Village II; Community Primary School, Inamere; Community Primary School, Adeogba; Karimu Village; Community Primary School, Adejumo; Olokunola Village; Balogun Village; Abule Tapa
Kajola	Ayetoro-Oke I	Behind Ologele Compound; In Front Of Laala Compound; Open Space Parakoyi Compound; Market Square Ayetoto-Oke; A. D. S. School, Ayetoto-Oke; Baptist Primary School, Ayetoro-Oke; Open Space Opp. Central Market, Ayetoto-Oke
Kajola	Elero	Igbo Compound; Olukotun/Onilu Compound; Gbenagbena Compound; Ero Compound; Agbero Compound; Alamuro Compound I; Alamuro Compound II; Maternity Centre, Ilero
Kajola	Gbelekale I & II	1st A. D. S. School, Ilero; Oke Omo Oba, Ilero; Abanti Compound, Ilero; Baba Eko Compound; Ajeji Compound; Oke Ago Ilero; Gboro Market Ilero; Roju Village; Adenle Market; Ajeji Market Area; Alokoloja Compound; Open Space Opposite Baba Eko Compound
Kajola	Iba-Ogan	2nd Baptist School, Ogan; Open Space, Oke Afofun; Opposite Tailor's Hall, Ogan; Open Space, Ajogelede Compound, Ogan; Near Ikolaba Compound, Ogan; Near Obagbaye Compound, Ogan; Near Otun Ago Area; Open Space Bode Market Square; Open Space Seriki Musulumi Area; Open Space Beside Alusekere; Near Motor Park; Community Primary School, Bode; Open Space Anile Lerin Compound; Open Space Masa Compound, Bode; Open Space Opposite Ajogelede Compound; Open Space Opposite Seriki Compound; Opp. Motor Garage Bode; Oke Afofun Area - Near Masa Petrol Station; Community Area - Near Masa Petrol Station
Kajola	Ijo	A. U. D. School, Eeyele; Near Blacksmith Workshop, Asin; Open Space Alubo Compound; Town Hall, Okeho; Open Space Olofin Compound; Sangote Ayetoro Road; Open Space Oja Oba, Ayetoto Road; Open Space Near Co-Operative Bank; Open Space Jaguncompound; Open Space Parakoyi Compound Ajelanwa; Open Space Opposite Jagun Compound
Kajola	Ilaji Oke/Iwere-Oke	Town Hall, Ilaji-Oke; Market Square, Ilaji Oke; Market Square, Iwere-Oke; Town Hall Iwere-Oke; Open Space Gegeje Area, Iwere-Oke; Open Space Beside Town Hall, Ilaji-Oke
Kajola	Imoba/Oke-Ogun	Ologbin Oke-Ogun; Open Space, Oke-Ogun; L. A. School, Alaapa; Open Space Near A. U. D. Mosque, Imoba; Open Space Alagbede, Isemi; Near Blacksmith Workshop, Isemi; Open Space, Ake Compound, Imoba; Open Space, Alagbede Compound, Oke-Ogun
Kajola	Isemi-Ile/Imia/Ilua	Beside Abaletu Compound, Oke Ago; Baptist Primary School, Isemi-Ile I; Baptist Primary School, Isemi-Ile II; In Front Of Maternity Centre, Isemi-Ile; Market Square, Isemi-Ile; Open Space Agbonini Compound; A. U. D. Primary School, Imia I; A. U. D. Primary School, Imia II; Igbogaa Village; Araromi Village; Ipaa Village; Open Space Opposite Agbonini House; Baptist School, Ilua; In Front Of Pa Jacob Ogundeji House; Beside Babasale Compound, Ilua; Court Hall, Ilua I; Court Hall, Ilua II; Beside Pa Adeseun Arinoje Compound; A. D. S. School, Ilua; Open Space Opposite Pa Adeseun Arinoje Compound
Kajola	Isia	Open Space Ajilu Compound, Isia; 1st Baptist School, Isia; Open Space Maya/Age Compound, Isia; Rest House Junction; Near Pa Adekunle House, Isia; Near Maye Ajetunmobi; Isia Market
Kajola	Olele	Open Space Omo-Oba; Open Space, Bekaila Arorolo; Gbonje Market Square; Near Parakoyi Compound - Gbonje; Shopping Complex (Old Motor Park); L. A. School, Olele; Ago Iserin; Open Space. Lebe Compound; Open Space Beside Ajana Compound; Elewure Primary School; Open Space M. T. D., Olele; Open Space Licensing Office; Central Market, Gbonje; In Front Of Oyedemi's Compound; Open Space Onile-Odo Compound, Olele; Open Space Oladejo's Area, Corner, Ake
Lagelu	Ajara/Opeodu	I. D. C. School, Akobo; Akobo Open Space (Opp. Oyediji Petrol Station); St. Stephen Primary School, Alegongo; Oju-Irin Onikokoro I; Oju-Irin Onikokoro II; I. D. C. Primary School, Ajara; I. D. C. Primary School, Ope Odu; Gbagi Village; Otun Olode Village
Lagelu	Apatere/Kuffi/Ogunbode/Ogo	Salvation Army School, Apatere; St. Paul's Primary School, Igbaro; St. Peters Primary School, Ogunbode; Oke-Ola Apatere; Ore Maternity; St. Andrews, School, Idi-Ogun; Salvation Primary School, Ogidi; Kuffi I; Isale Odo Open Space, Apatere
Lagelu	Arulogun Ehin/Kelebe	Court Hall, Olorunda; I. D. C. School, Ekerin-Ofijanran; St. Paul Primary School, Abudoro; Methodist Primary School, Kelebe; St. James Primary School, Arulogun; St. Andrews Ang. School, Idi-Igba
Lagelu	Ejioku/Igbon/Ariku	St. Anthony Primary School, Ejioku; Comm. Grammar School, Ejioku; Ile Baale, Ejioku; Irewole, Ejioku; Gbanla; Comm. Primary School, Arikuyeri; Comm. Primary School, Ile Igbon; St. Paul's School, Elegbaada; Oluwo Village; Fagbe Village; Comm. Primary School Suruku
Lagelu	Lagelu Market/Kajola/Gbena	Open Space, Gbena I; Open Space, Gbena II; Open Space, Texaco; Kajola Street I; Kajola Street II; Express Way Near Ojoo Garage; Open Space, Agbon; St. James Primary School, Agodi; Amuda Ojeere Open Space I; Amuda Ojeere Open Space II; Monatan Olusokan; Ajangboju Street; Open Space, Ogo-Oluwa; I. D. C. School, Oluwa; St. David's School, Abidiodan
Lagelu	Lalupon I	St. Lukes Primary School Lalupon; Isale Pako, Lalupon; Isale Osun, Lalupon; Akingbala Road (In Front Of Iya Eleko-Oko); Comm. Grammar School, Lalupon; Lalupon Junction (Bus-Stop) I; Lalupon Junction (Bus-Stop) II; Odo-Oba, Lalupon; Ajiwogbo Egan
Lagelu	Lalupon II	Anglican Central School, Lalupon; Court Hall, Lalupon; Islamic Primary School, Lalupon; Lalupon Central Mosque; Ile Orogun, Lalupon; Kuta (Near Deep Well); Ile Abata, Lalupon; Malunkan Village
Lagelu	Lalupon III	Ile Olori, Lalupon; Ile Imam, Lalupon; Ile Erin-Ngboro, Lalupon; Oke Ago, Lalupon; Otun Balogun; Idi - Osan Lalupon; St. James Primary School, Edun; Sobaloju Village
Lagelu	Ofa-Igbo	St. Peter's Primary School, Ofa-Igbo; Court Hall, Offa-Igbo; St. John's Primary School, Aba-Oje; Christ Church School, Jagun; Islamic Primary School, Adedokun; St. Augustine Primary School, Akinsawe; I. D. C. Primary School, Balogun; Ariku Oko; Ayetoro Village
Lagelu	Ogunjana/Olowode/Ogburo	C. A. C. Primary School, Olowode; St. Banabas Primary School, Ogunjana; Baptist Day School, Ogburo; Eleruko Nla Village; Bolorunduro Village
Lagelu	Ogunremi/Ogunsina	Ogunremi Village; Ogunsina Village; St. James School, Dagbolu; Alatare Village; Ogunsowo Village; Eleruko Village; C. A. C. Primary School, Morola; St. Matthew School, Agbedeyi; Omiyo Village; Onisango Village; Isagade Village
Lagelu	Oyedeji/Olode/Kutayi	I. D. C. Primary School, Elesu; Olode Village; Alape Village; Open Space, Oyedeji Market; Kutayi Village; R. C. M. School, Fawole; Kuffi II
Lagelu	Sagbe/Pabiekun	I. D. C. Primary School, Sagbe; Ogunranti Village; Olosunde Village; A. U. D. School, Anifa; Lelero Primary School; Kiire Village; I. D. C. Primary School, Alapata; Age Primary School
Ogbomoso North	Abogunde	Keji Open Space I; Keji Open Space II; Abede Open Space; Andero/Ajo Tailor Open Space; Agogo Ogun Open Space; Atunlakate Baaki Open Space; Abora D. C. School I; Abora D. C. School II; Olorunla, Abogunde; Aba / Atiba Open Space
Ogbomoso North	Aaje/Ogunbado	Alaro Open Space; Ajo Aaje I; Ajo Aaje II; Olonde Open Space; Ajo Tailor I; Ajo Tailor II; Ajo Carpenter I; Ajo Carpenter II; Abese Open Space; Ajo Oke-Agbede; Akinbola/Ikolaba Open Space; Balogun Agbede Open Space
Ogbomoso North	Aguodo/ Masifa	Adekeye Open Space; Oja Masifa I; Oja Masifa II; Ile Ago; Emmanuel Baptist School, Oke-Ado I; Emmanuel Baptist School, Oke-Ado II; Lemomu Open Space I; Lemomu Open Space II; Baale Isegun Open Space; Baara Masifa Open Space I; Baara Masifa Open Space II; Bode Eniafe; Gaa Ajoro/Nurudeen Primary School I; Gaa Ajoro/Nurudeen Primary School II; Baale Aguodo/Ajo Aguodo I; Baale Aguodo/Ajo Aguodo II; Baale Aguodo/Ajo Aguodo III; St. David Primary School I; St. David Primary School II; Masifa D. C. School I; Masifa D. C. School II; Masifa D. C. School III; Oke-Ado Ologidi/Masifa Baptist Primary School I; Oke-Ado Ologidi/Masifa Baptist Primary School II; Stadium Road I; Stadium Road II; Stadium Road III
Ogbomoso North	Isale Afon	Ajo Isale Afon I; Ajo Isale Afon II; Maternity Isale Afon; Abogunde Isale Afon I; Abogunde Isale Afon II; Ojude Ogun-Ojalu/ Lobanika; Postal Agency Open Space I; Postal Agency Open Space II; Postal Agency Open Space III; Ajo Elenji I; Ajo Elenji II; Baara, Isale Afon Open Space; Fedegbo, Isale Afon Open Space I; Fedegbo, Isale Afon Open Space II
Ogbomoso North	Isale Alaasa	Alaasa Open Space I; Alaasa Open Space II; Okanlawon/Olusubu Open Space; Akogun/Ologbin Open Space; Alaapa Open Space; Wada Open Space I; Wada Open Space II; Lawoore Open Space I; Lawoore Open Space II; Elebu Open Space I; Elebu Open Space II; St. Stephen's Anglican Primary School
Ogbomoso North	Isale Ora/Saja	Agunbiade Open Space I; Agunbiade Open Space II; Moberi Community Hall Open Space; Isale Ora/Ogunronbi/Postal Agency Open Space I; Isale Ora/Ogunronbi/Postal Agency Open Space II; Aremo Open Space I; Aremo Open Space II; Lemomu Open Space; Elemoso Open Space; Atanda Elemuye Open Space I; Atanda Elemuye Open Space II; Mogba, Idi Ose Open Space I; Mogba, Idi Ose Open Space II
Ogbomoso North	Jagun	Jagun Postal Agency; Akogun Open Space; Ajomagbodo Open Space; Pakoyi, Oja-Jagun Open Space I; Pakoyi, Oja-Jagun Open Space II; Ogojo/Sekengbede Open Space I; Ogojo/Sekengbede Open Space II; Roti Open Space; Lafa Open Space I; Lafa Open Space II
Ogbomoso North	Okelerin	Okelerin/Customary Court Open Space I; Okelerin/Customary Court Open Space II; Ebu Olugbon Open Space I; Ebu Olugbon Open Space II; Ipako Open Space I; Ipako Open Space II; Obamoo Oke Open Space; Alhaji Giwa Open Space; Are Ago Open Space I; Are Ago Open Space II; Ebenezer Baptist Primary School I; Ebenezer Baptist Primary School II; Olugbon Isale Open Space
Ogbomoso North	Osupa	Recreation Club, Takie; City Hotel I; City Hotel II; Idi Abebe; Osupa Baptist Day School I; Osupa Baptist Day School II; Fapote Open Space; Ajo Osupa; Baale Osupa Open Space I; Baale Osupa Open Space II; Fedegbo, Osupa Open Space I; Fedegbo, Osupa Open Space II; Blind Centre; Papa Alajiki I; Papa Alajiki II; Round About, Ayoka Road I; Round About, Ayoka Road II; Aaje Ikose; Ikose
Ogbomoso North	Sabo/Tara	Ape Egbe Open Space I; Ape Egbe Open Space II; Onigbinde Open Space I; Onigbinde Open Space II; Pakiotan Gbangudu Open Space; Alapa Local Government Dispensary Open Space I; Alapa Local Government Dispensary Open Space II; Onidaba Open Space I; Onidaba Open Space II; Oladodo Open Space; Alh. Aminu Open Space; Alh. Amusa Open Space; Olukotun Open Space; Oke Aanu Town Planning I; Oke Aanu Town Planning II; Sabo Open Space I; Sabo Open Space II; Apake Okelerin Primary School I; Apake Okelerin Primary School II; Apake Okelerin Primary School III
Ogbomoso South	Alapata	St. Ferdinand Primary School I; St. Ferdinand Primary School II; Sound Primary School I; Sound Primary School II; Sound Primary School III; Sound Primary School IV; Olopemarun Primary School I; Olopemarun Primary School II; Olopemarun Primary School III; Olopemarun Primary School IV; Kajola Area I; Kajola Area II; Zion Hospital I; Zion Hospital II; Sawmill Area I; Sawmill Area II; Co-Operative/Ologbon I; Co-Operative/Ologbon II; NTC Store
Ogbomoso South	Arowomole	Alokunsoro I; Alokunsoro II; Arowodananu Open Space I; Arowodananu Open Space II; Methodist Primary School, Arowomole I; Methodist Primary School, Arowomole II; Methodist Primary School, Arowomole III; Methodist Primary School, Arowomole IV; Bolade Mission; Owode Antorin; Ebila Olorode Open Space I; Ebila Olorode Open Space II; Baptist Health Centre; Isale Ajuwon I; Isale Ajuwon II
Ogbomoso South	Ibapon	Lajide Open Space I; Lajide Open Space II; Odo Koto I; Odo Koto II; Baale Ibapon Open Space I; Baale Ibapon Open Space II; Ijeru Primary School I; Ijeru Primary School II; Ijeru Primary School III; California I; California II; California III; California IV; California V; Federal Housing Estate; Baptist Grammar School I; Baptist Grammar School II; Baptist Grammar School III; Baptist Grammar School IV; Baptist Grammar School V; Ajo Abepe; Ajegunle; Bosunla Open Space I; Bosunla Open Space II
Ogbomoso South	Ijeru I	Ijeru Customary Court I; Ijeru Customary Court II; Ijeru Customary Court III; Buka Eko Akunko I; Buka Eko Akunko II; Buka Eko Akunko III; Ajo Onilu I; Ajo Onilu II; Osekun Open Space I; Osekun Open Space II; Ijeru Maternity I; Ijeru Maternity II; Ijeru Maternity III; Sokoto Open Space I; Sokoto Open Space II; Idi Isin
Ogbomoso South	Ijeru II	Alagadangba Open Space I; Alagadangba Open Space II; Idi Ose I; Idi Ose II; Idi Ose III; Abo Open Space I; Abo Open Space II; Akoba Open Space; Aireke Open Space I; Aireke Open Space II; Aireke Open Space III; Olokoo Open Space
Ogbomoso South	Isoko	Olola Open Space I; Olola Open Space II; Oja Akunko I; Oja Akunko II; Oja Akunko III; Oguro Arojo Open Space I; Oguro Arojo Open Space II; Oguro Onida Open Space I; Oguro Onida Open Space II; Oguro Onida Open Space III; Oguro Onida Open Space IV; Epo Open Space I; Epo Open Space II; Olota Akunko Open Space
Ogbomoso South	Lagbedu	Baale Lagbedu Open Space I; Baale Lagbedu Open Space II; Olugusi Open Space I; Olugusi Open Space II; Oniro Open Space I; Oniro Open Space II; Molete Open Space I; Molete Open Space II; Gaa Legbedu (Near Church) Open Space I; Gaa Legbedu (Near Church) Open Space II; Ija Oye Open Space I; Ija Oye Open Space II; Adediran Open Space I; Adediran Open Space II; Laka Epo Open Space
Ogbomoso South	Oke-Ola/Farm Settlement	Lafinhan Open Space I; Lafinhan Open Space II; Lafinhan Open Space III; Owolaake; Otun Open Space I; Otun Open Space II; Alubata Open Space I; Alubata Open Space II; Adeogun Open Space I; Adeogun Open Space II; Farm Settlement I; Farm Settlement II; Adindi
Ogo-Oluwa	Ajaawa I	Baptist Primary School, Ajaawa I; Baptist Primary School, Ajaawa II; Ode Balogun I; Ode Balogun II; Idi Ogun Area I; Idi Ogun Area II; Oke Ola Area I; Oke Ola Area II; Ode Alaro Area; Methodist Primary School, Mosunmaje; Idi Ori Akinwande; Oke Amuro Village; Agbeja/Aroya Primary School
Ogo-Oluwa	Ajaawa II	D. C. School, Ojutaye; Community Primary School, Osupa; Alagbon Parapo Village; Baptist Primary School, Ladanu; D. C. School, Obanisunwa
Ogo-Oluwa	Ayede	D. C. School, Ayede I; D. C. School, Ayede II; Odofo Village; Alawusa Oloye Primary School I; Alawusa Oloye Primary School II; Alawusa Oke Primary School
Ogo-Oluwa	Idewure	D. C. School, Alaguodo; Postal Agency, Idewure I; Postal Agency, Idewure II; Baptist Primary School, Idewure; Aba Thomas; Ajelanwa Village
Ogo-Oluwa	Mowolowo/Iwo-Ate	D. C. School, Mowolowo; Afilala Village; Baale Village; Iwo-Ate Oke I; Iwo-Ate Oke II; A. U. D. Primary School, Iwo-Ate; Iwo-Ate Isale; Onilu Village Junction
Ogo-Oluwa	Odo-Oba	Ibapon Village; Baptist Primary School, Ile-Abu; Owode/Sekona Village; Methodist Primary School, Odo-Oba I; Methodist Primary School, Odo-Oba II; Alawusa Road, Odo-Oba I; Alawusa Road, Odo-Oba II; Alawusa Road, Odo-Oba III; Dispensary, Odo-Oba I; Dispensary, Odo-Oba II; Sodabee Junction, Odo-Oba
Ogo-Oluwa	Opete	D. C. School, Opete; D. C. School, Idi-Araba; Ologorun Village; Ayegun Yemetu Primary School; Ikolaba Ayegun Village; Ayegun Araromi Primary School; Ile Tuntun Village; Ile Tuntun Primary School; D. C. School, Peere Aroje
Ogo-Oluwa	Otamokun	Otamokun Town Hall I; Otamokun Town Hall II; Baptist Primary School, Otamokun; Otamokun Dispensary; Olorunda Village; Baptist Primary School, Elega; Community Primary School, Ibere; Methodist Primary School, Eleesade I; Methodist Primary School, Eleesade II; Alaruru Dispensary; D. C. School, Ilofe; Oke Awo Village
Olorunsogo	Aboke (Aboyun Ogun)	Kondoro Primary School; Ogunbode Memorial Grammar School; Oke General; Opeloyeru (Open Space); Saint Paul Primary School; U. M. S. Primary School
Olorunsogo	Elerugba/Elehinke/Sagbo (Aperu)	Alabe; Apala; Balode; Idowu Elewe; Jelenke; Sagbo
Olorunsogo	Ikolaba/Obadimo	Atanda; Baptist Primary School I; Baptist Primary School II; L. A. School I; L. A. School II; Ogunte Nla
Olorunsogo	Onigbeti I (Iyamopo)	Olopoto Primary School; Court Hall I; Court Hall II; Ogunbiyi; Oke Abe; Oloko Jobi; Post Office
Olorunsogo	Onigbeti II/Sagbon Agoro (Sagbon)	Asinwa; Asunmade; Babamogba I; Babamogba II; Imam Open Space; Ogunte Kekere; Oloro
Olorunsogo	Onigbeti III & IV (Agbeni)	Local Government Market Stall; N. U. D. Primary School. I; N. U. D. Primary School. II; N. U. D. Primary School. III; N. U. D. Primary School. IV; Onipede; Sango Area
Olorunsogo	Opa/Ogunniyi	Alada; Apata Odo Opa; Ogundiran; Tesi Apata; Tesi Baba Pupa; Toolo
Olorunsogo	Seriki I & Abosino (Okin)	Alagbede; Babamoja; Kooko; Paakoyi; Oriade; Seriki I; Seriki II
Olorunsogo	Seriki II (Agbele)	Ago Are; Asamu; Ayandeyi; Ibukun Olu; Ologbon; Seriki Oke
Olorunsogo	Waro/Apata-Alaje	Apata Alaje; Ojo Aro; Karamo; Kunbi Amuda; Olupo; Pakoko/Waro
Oluyole	Ayegun	Olgs Ayegun; Aba-Ige; Olodo Village; St. John's Anglican School Apadi; Oba-Ado; Oditi-Okiti; Okese Olgs; Anaye; Lawande
Oluyole	Idi-Iroko/Ikereku	Abbey Technical; Asipa; Babalola Estate; I. D. C. Primary School, Idi-Oro; Open Space Gari Processing Orita Challenge; Revenue Collection Centre Orita Challenge I; Revenue Collection Centre Orita Challenge II; Molete High School; Podo Village; Oluyole High School I; Oluyole High School II; Elewura Grammar School; Oyalami Comm. Primary School; Olugbemi; Christ High School, Oleyo; Customary Court New Garage; Ayegunle Village; Idi-Iroko Ajewole; Odo-Ona Elewe (Market) Junction
Oluyole	Idi-Osan/Egbeda-Atuba	Pegba; Egbeda Atuba Olgs; Jagun Olukade; Olokonla Primary School; Ayetoro Village; Idi-Iroko
Oluyole	Muslim/Ogbere	Muslim Grammar School, Odinjo I; Muslim Grammar School, Odinjo II; Muslim Grammar School, Odinjo III; In Front Of Kajola Hotel; Ifelodun Comm. Primary School; New Maternity Masfala; Maternity Ifelodun; Open Space Masfala Junction I; Open Space Masfala Junction II; Awowo Village; Omiyale Old Hospital I; Omiyale Old Hospital II; Irepodun Town Planning; Irepodun Asanke Village (Craft Centre)
Oluyole	Odo-Ona Nla	Orile Odo St. Martins; St. Michael Odo-Ona Nla I; St. Michael Odo-Ona Nla II; Crin Staff School; Bus Stop In Front Of Local Government Hall I; Bus Stop In Front Of Local Government Hall II; Alomaja/Esuoso Gari Processing Centre; Odo-Ona Kekere Primary School; Alata St. John School; Idi-Mangoro
Oluyole	Okanhinde/Latunde	Olojuoro Pry. Sch.; Owoade Pry. Sch.; Agbeja; Papa Village Aprimary School; Latunde Primary School; Okanhinde; Apasan
Oluyole	Olomi/Olurinde	Idc School, Olurinde; Olomi School 1 A; Olomi School 1 B; Olomi School II A; Olomi School II B; Comm. Pry. Sch. Kolajo; Customary Court, Olomi; Open Agbe Open Space; Maternity Centre, Olomi I; Maternity Centre, Olomi II; Agbamu Road, Sanyo; Sagari Sanyo; Titilope Area 1; Titilope Area 2; Olorunkemi Area; Aba-Alfa; Ajofebo Village
Oluyole	Olonde/Aba-Nla	Olonde Olgs; Prospect High School, Aba-Nla; Ikija Primary School; Olg Sch. Dada; Akaho Olgs; Olokuta Olgs; Oja-Ibadan; Omi-Aboderin; Mokore Olgs; Sanusi Olgs; Ajanla Olgs; Balogun Olgs
Oluyole	Onipe	All Saints School, Onipe; Longe Primary School; Busogboro Primary School; Onigambari; Lagunju; Dalley; Olubi; Lamolo; Gbale Asun Olgs; Abipo
Oluyole	Orisunbare/Ojo-Ekun	Makinde Olose; Ara-Oje; Orisunbare Village; Odokuodo Primary School; Ojo-Ekun; Odo-Okun Primary School; Pako; Omigbopa Primary School
Ona-Ara	Akanran/Olorunda	Islamic Mission School, Akanran; St. James School, Akanran; St. James School, Olorunda; Gbeleyi Primary School; Fada; Ojeleye
Ona-Ara	Araromi/Aperin	Araromi Aperin; Osun Eleja; Afolabi Obideyi; Apasan; Iyalode; Fajoye; Kajola
Ona-Ara	Badeku	St. John's School, Badeku I; St. John's School, Badeku II; Town Hall Badeku; Oke-Ola Badeku; Idi-Epa; Jago; Butu - Butu
Ona-Ara	Gbada Efon	Gbada Efon; Adigun; Lamini; Ogidi; Gbangba
Ona-Ara	Odi Odeyale/Odi Aperin	Amuloko; Idi Ose; Odeyale; Olubode; Aba Emu I; Aba Emu II
Ona-Ara	Ogbere Tioya	Moga; Akilapa Babanla; Gari Industry; Elekuro High School; Elebolo; I. D. C. School Olunloyo I; I. D. C. School Olunloyo II; I. D. C. School Olunloyo III; Orita-Merin I; Orita-Merin II; Methodist Primary School, Gangansi; Jegede; Ori-Aran; Adeyalo
Ona-Ara	Ojoku/Ajia	Ajia I; Ajia II; Ashipa Primary School; Ojoku; Bioku; Oke Ogun
Ona-Ara	Olorunsogo	Motor Park I; Motor Park II; Revenue Collection Centre I; Revenue Collection Centre II; Sawia; Ifelajulo; Mokore; Nepa; Obalende; Ayekale Aprimary School; Dalemo Idi Ose; Olosunde; Awotunde Primary School; Akinbode Space
Ona-Ara	Olode/Gbedun/Ojebode	Anglican Grammar School, Ojebode; St. Joseph School, Gbedun; Elese Erin; Akinkemi; Jegede; Amosun; Fawande
Ona-Ara	Oremeji/Agugu	Dalemo Bus Stop; New Post Office Oremeji; Idi Oro Oremeji; Atolu Primary School I; Atolu Primary School II; Oriyangi; Okiki Ade; Olororo; Omowumi; Agbolu Aje Open Space
Oorelope	Alepata	Awujoola Compound, Obaago; Customary Court, Obaago; C & S. Primary School; Community Centre, Iyaa; Opoo Village; Budo Ode Village; Kajola Village
Oorelope	Bonni	A. U. D. School/Loko Comp, Bonni I; A. U. D. School/Loko Comp, Bonni II; Balogun Comp., Bonni I; Balogun Comp., Bonni II; Ikolaba Compound, Bonni; Adegbola Compound, Bonni; Ologede Sallu Village; Imam Compound, Bonni; Balode Compound, Bonni; Sooro Village; Gbedegun Village; Gbedegun Villageologede Village; Sule Village; Onisile Village; Ezekiel Village
Oorelope	Igbope/Iyeye I	Muslim Primary School, Igbope; Community Hall, Igbope I; Community Hall, Igbope II; Okanlawon Compound, Igbope; Alaguntan Village
Oorelope	Igbope/Iyeye II	Baptist Primary School, Igbope; Idi Iyeye, Igbope; Lasi Village; Lube Village; Ajangba Village
Oorelope	Igi Isubu	Igi Isubu Community Centre - Ago I; Igi Isubu Community Centre - Ago II; Odo Ogun
Oorelope	Onibode I	Mosafejo Compound, Modeke; Oluwo Akanbi Compound; Ayetoro Junction; Modeke Garage; Ogba/Mogaji Compound, Modeke; Modeke Temple
Oorelope	Onibode II	Community Hall, Modeke; Modeke Market; Ago Compound, Modeke; Anikulapo/Karegbonla I; Anikulapo/Karegbonla II; Ajegunle Compound, Modeke; Idi Adamaso Compound; Imala Compound, Modeke
Oorelope	Onibode III	Baptist Primary School, Modeke; Baptist Primary School, Jayin; Community Primary School, Akasa; Ajonjaye Compound, Modeke; Yaye Village; A. U. D./Ogba Compound, Modeke; Alegenibi Compound, Modeke; Balogun Compound Modeke; Oba Compound, Modeke; Aba Sunday Village
Oorelope	Onigboho/Alomo/Okere	Town Hall, Owode; Maternity Centre, Owode; Okegboho Baptist Primary/Agoro Comp.; Akia Compound, Ago Okere; Balogun Compound, Jakuta; Asaju Compound, Jakuta; Agoro Compound, Jakuta; Alamuro Comp./Ikolaba Okegboho I; Alamuro Comp./Ikolaba Okegboho II; Arusa Compound, Okegboho; Aokun Village; Fomu Village; Gungunmi Village; Odo Ogun Village; Odo Ogun (Idera)
Ori Ire	Ori Ire I	Ikoyi Court Hall, Ikoyi I; Ikoyi Court Hall, Ikoyi II; Ikoyi Court Hall, Ikoyi III; L. A. Primary School, Ikoyi I; L. A. Primary School, Ikoyi II; Baptist Primary School, Ladokun; St. Agnes Primary School, Iluju; Saamo Open Space; Ladokun Junction, Iluju I; Ladokun Junction, Iluju II; Fapote Open Space; Onitinrinopen Space; Abule Elemo Open Space; Egbejoda Open Space; Apiti Open Space; Aipo Open Space
Ori Ire	Ori Ire II	Tewure New Market; Tewure Old Market; Oloya Open Space; L. A. Primary School, Tewure I; L. A. Primary School, Tewure II; Araromi Open Space; Oloru Open Space; Ilodo Open Space; Eleruwa Open Space; Budo Alfa Open Space; Olose Open Space; Oja Titun
Ori Ire	Ori Ire III	St. Peters School, Ajinapa I; St. Peters School, Ajinapa II; Omidoyin Open Space; Olorunda Open Space I; Olorunda Open Space II; Ladele Open Space; Bofowo Open Space; Bosero Open Space; Aje-Ajinapa Open Space; Ipekun Open Space I; Ipekun Open Space II; Ogidi Open Space; Ayekale Open Space; Isepo Open Space; Igbo Ologun Open Space I; Igbo Ologun Open Space II; Ayepe Open Space
Ori Ire	Ori Ire IV	Adafila Open Space I; Adafila Open Space II; Alapete Open Space; Kajola Open Space; Aribaba Open Space; Ogbin Open Space; Onikoko Open Space; Eleyele Open Space
Ori Ire	Ori Ire V	Alawodi Open Space; Oloka Open Space; Gbogun Open Space; Adekanmbi Open Space; Alaja Open Space; C. A. C. Primary School, Obamo I; C. A. C. Primary School, Obamo II; Olode Elelu Open Space; Fedegbo/Olokiti Open Space; Igbooran Open Space I; Igbooran Open Space II; Alaidan Open Space; Baba Gaa Open Space; Kedo Open Space; Tewure Iju Open Space
Ori Ire	Ori Ire VI	Eseke Open Space I; Eseke Open Space II; Omowale Open Space I; Omowale Open Space II; Arigidana Open Space; Igbo Elemi Open Space I; Igbo Elemi Open Space II; Olokoto Open Space; Takan-Asanre Open Space; Baba Eko Open Space; Arowosaye Open Space; Igbori Open Space; Okuguguru Open Space; Odun Ifa Open Space; Alatori Open Space; Abe Abaja Open Space; Onilali Open Space; Dogo Open Space; Ijana Oja Open Space; Alasapa Open Space
Ori Ire	Ori Ire VII	Oolo Open Space I; Oolo Open Space II; Asani Open Space; Ipeba Open Space; Elega Open Space; Aba-Oba Open Space; Maya Ayetoro Open Space I; Maya Ayetoro Open Space II; Ita Maya Open Space; Jolapamo/Oko Oba Open Space; Old Ayetoro Open Space; Bowula Open Space; Adetunji Open Space; Lagbelagbe Open Space
Ori Ire	Ori Ire VIII	Ajegunle-Gbenro Open Space; Igbo Alaje Open Space; Ahoro Dada Open Space I; Ahoro Dada Open Space II; Ahoro Dada Open Space III; Ahoro Dada Open Space IV; Moleyo Open Space I; Moleyo Open Space II; Biiro Open Space; Aawon Open Space; Alagbede Open Space; Odogbo Open Space
Ori Ire	Ori Ire IX	Ahoro Oko, Open Space I; Ahoro Oko, Open Space II; Ahoro Oko, Open Space III; Otun Alapo, Open Space; Ahoro Esinele, Open Space I; Ahoro Esinele, Open Space II; Ahoro Esinele, Open Space III; Yawota, Open Space; Oniya, Open Space; Ajelanwa Primary School; Alaropo Nla, Open Space I; Alaropo Nla, Open Space II; Awaye, Open Spade; Daninu, Open Space; Bolorunduro, Open Space; Olojiji, Open Space; Opeola, Open Space; Olokiti, Open Space I; Olokiti, Open Space II; Ayegun Awon, Open Space
Ori Ire	Ori Ire X	Elesun Open Space I; Elesun Open Space II; Alaropo/Akinyele Open Space; Abojosun Open Space; Ayegun Open Space; Lasubu Open Space I; Lasubu Open Space II; Alada Open Space; Boosa Open Space I; Boosa Open Space II; Bosunla Open Space I; Bosunla, Open Space II; Iporin Open Space; Elere Pamo Open Space; Egbejoda Open Space; Ajegunle Oba Open Space; Awerankale Open Space; Lapelu Primary School; Ajagase Open Space; Jagbe Open Space; Adetunji Open Space
Oyo East	Agboye/Molete	Baptist School Agboye; Min. Of Trade & Industries; Agure O/S; Molete O/S; Ode Alare O/S; Maye Village; Iseke Village
Oyo East	Ajagba	Ajagba O/S; Olori O/S; Kosobo O/S I; Kosobo O/S II; Idiape/Yara O/S; Ajagba Village; Ogbagba Village; Olori Village; Imeleke Village; Asunmoge Village; Methodist School, Apaara; Abiodun Atiba (Kosobo) O/S
Oyo East	Alaodi/Modeke	Alaodi O/S; Modeke O/S; R. C. M. Asogo O/S; Kanga O/S; Jagun O/S; Ago Ana Village; Gudugbu Orile Village; Otefoyin Village
Oyo East	Apaara	Apaara Market; Loogun O/S; Agbajuwon O/S; Gbogbolomo O/S; Aro Olusigun O/S; Obede O/S; St. Augustine Odo Aro; Gaa Apaara O/S; Apaara Village; Obede Village; Gboro/Onsa Village
Oyo East	Apinni	Alapinni Open Space; Lakonu O/S; Ope Arinago O/S; Ago Isona O/S; Arole /Iya Omooba O/S; Federal Low Cow Cost O/S; Owode Elete Village; Agboye Village; Irepo Lerinowon Village; Ona Ara Igboga Village; Oriyangi Village; Ile Oba Village; St. Luke's Idode Village
Oyo East	Jabata	Molaba O/S; Lakanla O/S; L. A. School, Jabata; Lamulatu/Idiope O/S; Durowoju Area O/S; Olorunsogo Area O/S; Gberu Area O/S; Owode (Court Area) O/S; Owode Market (Behind Elewi Ciga Village); Ago Oyo Village
Oyo East	Oke Apo	Oke Apo O/S; Aguo O/S; Otun Onilu/Alase O/S; Abujakan Village; Bodija Village; Akoda Igbo Olosun Village; Oke Apo Village; Alabi Olorunda Village; Anlelerin Village; Oja Omooba Village; Igbo Aje Village
Oyo East	Oluajo	Oluajo O/S; Ilaka O/S; Okobiya O/S; Olojulemeta O/S; Ara Oyo O/S; Ona Aka Oloola Village; Igi-Ogun Village; Emiabata Village; Idi Iya Village
Oyo East	Owode/Araromi	Owode(Near Motor Park); Araromi Market O/S; Araromi (Behind Olivet); St. Michael Araromi; Adewinbi O/S; Tobacco (Beside Oysaico); Mabolaje; Idi Ito Village; Ekewa Village; Alausa Village; Aguo Village
Oyo West	Akeetan	Methodist School, Akeetan I; Methodist School, Akeetan II; Akeetan Bale Market I; Akeetan Bale Market II; Odofin Area; Idi-Ope Primary School; Alagbon Junction
Oyo West	Ajokidero/Akewugberu	Ankuri; Asunmo; Obalolu I; Obalolu II; Onatetu; Onalemole; Ajokidero; Akewugberu I; Akewugberu II; Oloya Village; Egbeda Village; Ogunda Village; Eleja/Kelebe Village
Oyo West	Fasola/Soku	Fasola I; Fasola II; Baptist School. Soku Village I; Baptist School. Soku Village II; Egunbiyi Village; Igbokekere Village; Iya Ibeji Village; Aladie Village; Olukotun Village; Lakonu Village; Akin-Nu Village; Gborun/Onsa Village
Oyo West	Iseke	Iseke Market I; Iseke Market II; Elepe, Open Space; Eleye, Open Space; Olukosi, Open Space; Gogo, Open Space; Apogidan, Open Space; Ejemu, Open Space
Oyo West	Isokun I	L. A. School, Bola; Ladindin/Olokomeje; Ojongbodu; Ologuro/Alalubosa; Laagbe Village; Itosi Akowe Village; Ojongbodu Village; Orowole Village; Obanako Village; Aba Igbo Village; St. Peters School, Iyalode Village; Aruna Village; Ojutaye Village; Aba Ilorin Village
Oyo West	Isokun II	L. A. School, Awumoro; Ekerin Isokun; Otun Isokun Maradesa Junction; Baptist School, Isokun; Celestial Area; Celestial Road; Iyaji Titun Layout; Gudugbu; Old Oyo National Park / Irepo Market; Oluwatedo Village; Baptist Primary School, Oluwatedo Village
Oyo West	Iyaji	Isale Agbala Open Space; R. C. M. Primary School Sanga; Iyaji, Open Space; Garage/Osisona, Open Space; Mogba, Open Space; Ebu Alapo, Open Space; Yaya, Open Space; Abogunde, Open Space; Akin-Nu, Open Space
Oyo West	Opapa	Alagbede, Open Space; Osidasa, Open Space; Fatuke, Open Space; Edun, Open Space; Ogbeyo, Open Space; Baba Ibadan Open Space; Opapa/Aseke, Open Space
Oyo West	Pakoyi/Idode	Pakoyi, Open Space I; Pakoyi, Open Space II; Besin, Open Space; Kolobo, Open Space; Olu-Ewu, Open Space; Idode, Open Space; Alakitan/Onlada; Iyalaje, Open Space
Saki East	Agbonle	Baptist Primary School, Agbonle I; Baptist Primary School, Agbonle II; Local Government Dispensary, Agbonle; Aba Ilero, Agbonle; Aba Ilado, Agbonle; Aba Arowomole, Agbonle; Aba Olojola, Agbonle; Aba Jamburuku, Agbonle; Aba Saaka, Agbonle
Saki East	Ago Amodu I	A. U. D. School, Ago Amodu; Baptist Primary School, Ago Amodu I; Baptist Primary School, Ago Amodu II; L. G. Market, Ago Amodu; Ode Lobayanran, Ago Amodu; Ode Agoro, Ago Amodu; Ode Ikolaba, Ago Amodu; Ita Alapo Oke, Ago Amodu; Aba Paanu, Ago Amodu
Saki East	Ago Amodu II	L. G. Disp. Ago-Amodu; Ode Akinlapa, Ago Amodu; Ode Oju Oja, Ago Amodu I; Ode Oju Oja, Ago Amodu II; Ode Baba Meta, Ago Amodu; Ita Oniwinde, Ago Amodu; Olusami Transformer; Aba Aladura; Budo Banki
Saki East	Ogbooro I	Maternity Centre, Ogbooro I; Maternity Centre, Ogbooro II; Baptist Primary School, Ogbooro I; Baptist Primary School, Ogbooro II; A. U. D. Primary School, Ogbooro I; A. U. D. Primary School, Ogbooro II; Ayetoro, Ogbooro; Aba Alajuba, Ogbooro; Aba Ojumokan, Ogbooro
Saki East	Ogbooro II	Ayeboopo I, Ogbooro A; Ayeboopo I, Ogbooro B; Ayeboopo II, Ogbooro A; Ayeboopo II, Ogbooro B; Aba Daodu, Ogbooro; Aba Olaniyan, Ogbooro I; Aba Olaniyan, Ogbooro II; Aba Apata, Ogbooro; Aba Amukoko, Ogbooro
Saki East	Oje Owode I	Baptist School, Oje Owode; Community Primary School, Oje Owode I; Community Primary School, Oje Owode II; Court Hall, Oje Owode; Town Hall, Oje Owode; Gbelekale, Ojo Owode I; Gbelekale, Ojo Owode II; Ode Ikolaba, Oje Owode; Ode Balode, Oje Owode; Aba Sango, Oje Owode; Gaa Adamu, Oje Owode
Saki East	Oje Owode II	N. U. D. Primary School, Oje Owode I; N. U. D. Primary School, Oje Owode II; Central Market, Oje Owode; Near Post Office I, Oje Owode; Near Post Office II, Oje Owode; Ode Onigbagbo, Oje Owode; Ode Olaleye, Oje Owode; Baale Ayeto, Oje Owode; Aba Layipapa, Oje Owode; Gaa Baale, Oje Owode; Aba Ogunlere, Oje Owode
Saki East	Sepeteri I	Community Primary School, Sepeteri I; Community Primary School, Sepeteri II; Ode Alapo, Sepeteri; Ode Otun Agoro, Sepeteri I; Ode Otun Agoro, Sepeteri II; Ode Laku, Sepeteri; Ode Ogunte, Sepeteri; Aba Alesinloye, Sepeteri; Aba Amodi, Sepeteri
Saki East	Sepeteri II	Baptist Primary School, Sepeteri; Ode Alogunlode, Sepeteri; Ode Asu, Sepeteri; Ode Baba Olaifa, Sepeteri; Aba Kanga, Sepeteri; Aba Ogunsipe, Sepeteri; Aba Onikosa, Sepeteri; Aba Iyake, Sepeteri
Saki East	Sepeteri III	Court Hall, Sepeteri I; Court Hall, Sepeteri II; Ode Baale Iyakun, Sepeteri; Ode Iyalaje, Sepeteri; Ode Oba Onisanbo, Sepeteri; Ode Kojusoba, Sepeteri; Ode Owolabi Dada, Sepeteri; Isale Akindin, Sepeteri; Gaa Kewulere, Sepeteri
Saki East	Sepeteri IV	N. U. D. School, Sepeteri; L. A. Primary School, Sepeteri; L. G. Dispensary, Sepeteri; Ode Abijako, Sepeteri; Aba Okeho, Sepeteri; Aba Mangoro, Sepeteri; Aba Mattew; Aba Woru, Sepeteri
Saki West	Aganmu/Kooko	Bamobi's House; Larinre's House I; Larinre's House II; Community High School Ayekale I; Community High School Ayekale II; Community High School Ayekale III; Community High School Ayekale IV; Ayekale Baptist Primary School; Igbo-Ologun; Ita Baale Agbele; Aladura, Isale-Ola; Kodoroko; Ita Bale Kooko I; Ita Bale Kooko II; Bamimore's House; Towobola's House; Baba Awo
Saki West	Bagii	L. A. School, Isia I; L. A. School, Isia II; Baptist School, Otun I; Baptist School, Otun II; Baptist School, Otun III; Tax Office I; Tax Office II; Oloro's House; Ayeto Junction I; Ayeto Junction II; Oloko's House I; Oloko's House II; Oke-Odo I; Oke-Odo II; Beside Ajibade
Saki West	Ekokan / Imua	Community Primary School, Owode; Community Primary School, Sanni Sala I; Community Primary School, Sanni Sala II; Budo Ali Okerete; Orita (Okerete); Ataye; Community Primary School, Ekokan I; Community Primary School, Ekokan II; African Baptist School, Imua; Community Primary School, Onigbongbo I; Community Primary School, Onigbongbo II; Aba Ogbomoso; Wasangare Oja; Wasangare Alabafe; Gbepakan
Saki West	Iya	N. U. D. School Sango I; N. U. D. School Sango II; N. U. D. School Sango III; N. U. D. School Sango IV; Front Of Baba-Isale I; Front Of Baba-Isale II; Front Of Baba-Isale III; Iya Dispensary I; Iya Dispensary II; Iya Dispensary III; Alaraje; African Baptist School I; African Baptist School II; African Baptist School III; Front Of Otepala; Front Of Amuda-Otun; Front Of Elebenla; Onigbaojule Junction; Shittu Ore
Saki West	Ogidigbo/Kinnikinni	Ogidigbo Market I; Ogidigbo Market II; L. A. School, Onikeke I; L. A. School, Onikeke II; L. A. School, Onikeke III; L. A. School, Onikeke IV; Odo-Osun I; Odo-Osun II; Baptist School, Kinnikinni I; Baptist School, Kinnikinni II; Baptist School, Kinnikinni III; Baptist School, Kinnikinni IV; Idera; Idera Market; Igbo-Elewuro; Yankan; Agoluabi; Agoluabi (Ntc)
Saki West	Oke-Oro	Oke-Oro Market I; Oke-Oro Market II; Oke-Oro Market III; Ajegunle Baptist School I; Ajegunle Baptist School II; Ajegunle Baptist School III; Taba Dispensary I; Taba Dispensary II; Cooperative Bank; Ita Baale, Oke-Oro I; Ita Baale, Oke-Oro II; Idi-Igba; Idi-Ogun
Saki West	Okere I	Town Hall I; Town Hall II; Ile Oye Oke Daodu I; Ile Oye Oke Daodu II; Ile Oye Oke Daodu III; Idi-Agbon I; Idi-Agbon II; Adabo Market I; Adabo Market II; Ogbogbo Ibuke I; Ogbogbo Ibuke II; Jangbadi I; Jangbadi II
Saki West	Okere II	Okere Grammar School; Idi-Ero; Owode Market I; Owode Market II; Old Veterinary I; Old Veterinary II; Old Veterinary III; Opo-Malu Junction I; Opo-Malu Junction II; Opo-Malu Junction III; Baba-Ijesa I; Baba-Ijesa II; Baba-Ijesa III; Baba-Ijesa IV; A. U. D. High School I; A. U. D. High School II; Bagbansoro; Oke Suna
Saki West	Sangote/Booda/Baabo/Ilua	Araro Water Tap; Araro Near Water Tap I; Araro Near Water Tap II; Under Sekeseke Tree I; Under Sekeseke Tree II; Eleego Area; Ita Baale Baabo I; Ita Baale Baabo II; Baptist School, Oge I; Baptist School, Oge II; Baptist School, Oge III; Baptist School, Oge IV; Boodilu Market; Ajelanwa Market I; Ajelanwa Market II; Ogidigbo Market I; Ogidigbo Market II; Egbeda Market; Sangote; Front Of Tijani Baba's House; Sangote Area; Olomopupo, Ilua; Adesiyan Ilua; Yemere
Saki West	Sepeteri/Bapon	L. A. School Taba I; L. A. School Taba II; Opposite Police Station I; Opposite Police Station II; Agbongbo Market; Front Of Bapon's House; Aduronibiodara I; Aduronibiodara II; Oloba's Compound I; Oloba's Compound II; Front Of Oyesade I; Front Of Oyesade II; Front Of Oyesade III; Ajeunsinudeku I; Ajeunsinudeku II; Beside Elewuodo; Front Of Mosa; Front Of Ojase; Ogbalanja; Abadawaki

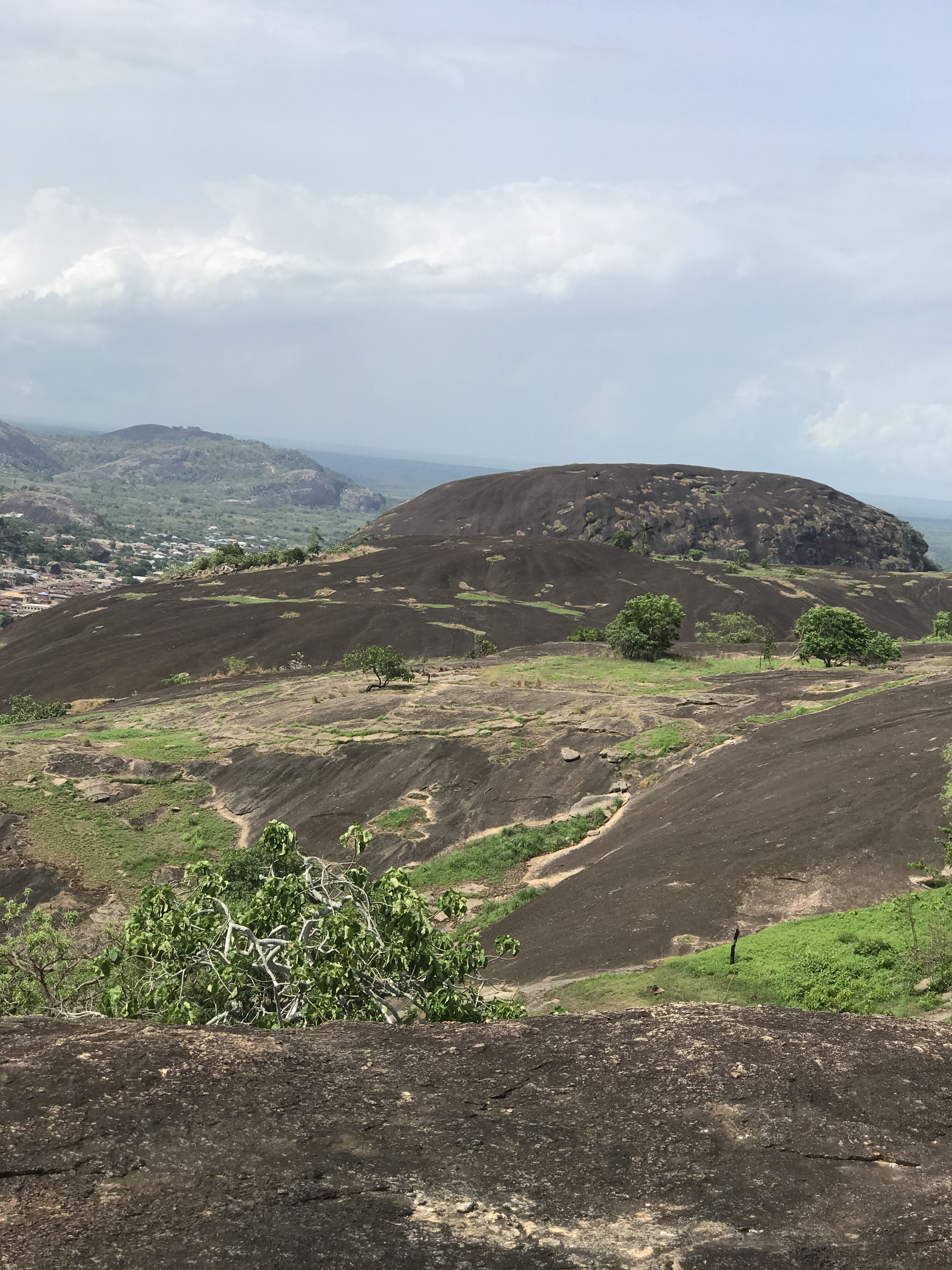
Imofin Hill 1
