= List of industry trade groups in the United States =

This is a list of notable industry trade groups in the United States.

== National ==
=== Advertising, business, marketing ===
- American Advertising Federation
- American Association of Advertising Agencies
- American Independent Business Alliance
- American Marketing Association
- Association of National Advertisers
- Commercial Real Estate Women
- Community Associations Institute
- Council of American Survey Research Organizations
- Institute for Supply Management
- International Council of Shopping Centers
- International Intellectual Property Alliance
- Marketing Research Association
- Million Dollar Round Table
- National Association of Real Estate Brokers
- National Association of Realtors
- Outdoor Advertising Association of America
- Produce Marketing Association
- Promotion Marketing Association
- Public Relations Society of America
- United States Chamber of Commerce

=== Agriculture ===
- American Animal Hospital Association
- American Christmas Tree Association
- American Corn Growers Association
- American Hereford Association
- American Horse Council
- Corn Refiners Association
- CropLife International
- Farm Foundation
- Consumer Brands Association
- Hemp Industries Association

=== Clothing, apparel, footwear, fashion ===
- American Apparel & Footwear Association
- Fashion Originators' Guild of America
- Council of Fashion Designers of America

=== Construction ===
- American Institute of Constructors
- American Subcontractors Association
- Associated Builders and Contractors
- Associated General Contractors of America
- IAPMO (International Association of Plumbing and Mechanical Officials)
- Independent Electrical Contractors
- Mason Contractors Association of America
- Metal Construction Association
- National Association of Construction Auditors
- National Association of Home Builders
- National Roofing Contractors Association
- Pipe Line Contractors Association

=== Energy ===
- Air Conditioning, Heating and Refrigeration Institute
- Alliance to Save Energy
- American Clean Power Association
- American Coalition for Clean Coal Electricity
- American Council on Renewable Energy
- American Gas Association
- American Petroleum Institute
- American Public Gas Association
- American Public Power Association
- American Wind Energy Association
- Atomic Industrial Forum
- Building Performance Association
- Edison Electric Institute
- Geothermal Energy Association
- International Renewable Energy Alliance
- National Hydropower Association
- National Rural Electric Cooperative Association
- Nuclear Energy Institute
- Pellet Fuels Institute
- Sheet Metal and Air Conditioning Contractors' National Association
- Solar Energy Industries Association
- United States Energy Association

=== Entertainment and leisure ===
- American Amusement Machine Association
- American Pyrotechnics Association
- American Society of Travel Agents
- Archery Trade Association
- Asian American Hotel Owners Association
- The Broadway League
- Entertainment Software Association
- Fantasy Sports Trade Association
- Free Speech Coalition
- Game Manufacturers Association
- Hotel Technology Next Generation
- International Art Materials Trade Association
- International Association of Travel Agents Network
- International Festivals and Events Association
- International Inbound Travel Association
- Professional Lighting and Sound Association
- Recreational Software Advisory Council

=== Financial, insurance ===
- ACA International
- American Bankers Association
- American Council of Life Insurers
- American Credit Union Mortgage Association
- American Financial Services Association
- American Investment Council
- America's Credit Unions
- America's Health Insurance Plans
- Bank Policy Institute
- Consumer Bankers Association
- Financial Industry Regulatory Authority
- Financial Services Forum
- Futures Industry Association
- Independent Community Bankers of America
- Institute of International Finance
- International Securities Lending Association
- Managed Funds Association
- Mortgage Bankers Association
- NACHA
- Organization for International Investment
- Regional Bond Dealers Association
- Risk and Insurance Management Society
- Securities Industry and Financial Markets Association

=== Food ===
- American Beverage Association
- American Beverage Institute
- American Meat Institute
- American Mushroom Institute
- American Pie Council
- Beer Institute
- Bread Bakers Guild of America
- Brewers Association
- Council for Responsible Nutrition
- Distilled Spirits Council of the United States
- Food Products Association
- International Association of Operative Millers
- International Bottled Water Association
- International Dairy-Deli-Bakery Association
- Juice Products Association
- Retailer Owned Food Distributors & Associates
- Specialty Coffee Association of America
- Specialty Wine Retailers Association
- U.S. Poultry & Egg Association
- United States Brewers' Association
- Wine and Spirits Wholesalers of America

=== Healthcare, Medicine, Medical Devices, Pharmaceuticals and Environment ===
- AABB (American Association of Blood Banks)
- AdvaMed
- Ambulatory Surgery Center Association
- American Ambulance Association
- American Herbal Products Association
- American Hospital Association
- American Medical Association
- American Pharmacists Association
- Bio Process Systems Alliance
- Biotechnology Innovation Organization
- Care Continuum Alliance
- Catholic Health Association of the United States
- Congress of Chiropractic State Associations
- Federation of American Hospitals
- International Solid Waste Association
- National Association for Home Care & Hospice
- National Association for the Support of Long Term Care
- National Committee for Quality Assurance
- Pharmaceutical care management association
- Pharmaceutical Research and Manufacturers of America
- The Vision Council
- Urgent Care Association (UCA)

=== Higher education ===
- American Association of Colleges for Teacher Education
- American Association of Colleges of Nursing
- American Association of Community Colleges
- American Association of State Colleges and Universities
- American Association of University Professors
- American Association of University Women
- American College Health Association
- American Council on Education
- American Dental Education Association
- Association of American Colleges and Universities
- Association of American Law Schools
- Association of American Medical Colleges
- Association of American Universities
- Association of Catholic Colleges and Universities
- Association of Community College Trustees
- Association of Governing Boards of Universities and Colleges
- Association of Jesuit Colleges and Universities
- Association of Public and Land-grant Universities
- Career Education Colleges and Universities
- Council for Christian Colleges and Universities
- Council of Independent Colleges
- National Association for College Admission Counseling
- National Association of Independent Colleges and Universities
- National Collegiate Athletic Association
- United Negro College Fund

=== Industry ===
- The Aluminum Association
- American Bar Association
- American Bearing Manufacturers Association
- American Chemistry Council
- American Cleaning Institute
- American Composites Manufacturers Association
- American Forest & Paper Association
- American Gear Manufacturers Association
- American Hardware Manufacturers Association
- American Home Furnishings Alliance
- American Iron and Steel Institute
- American National Standards Institute
- American Plastics Council
- American Watchmakers-Clockmakers Institute
- American Water Works Association
- American Welding Society
- ASHRAE (American Society of Heating, Refrigerating and Air-Conditioning Engineers)
- Associated Equipment Distributors
- Associated Locksmiths of America
- Association for High Technology Distribution (AHTD)
- Association for Manufacturing Technology
- Association for Materials Protection and Performance
- Association of Equipment Manufacturers
- Battery Council International
- Bearing Specialists Association
- Can Manufacturers Institute
- Closure & Container Manufacturers Association
- Compressed Air and Gas Institute
- Cordage Institute
- Crane Manufacturers Association of America
- Energy and Minerals Business Council
- Glass Packaging Institute
- Hearth, Patio & Barbecue Association
- Household & Commercial Products Association
- Institute of Boiler and Radiator Manufacturers
- Institute of Scrap Recycling Industries
- International Association of Elevator Consultants
- International Association of Plastics Distributors
- International Association of Refrigerated Warehouses
- International Council on Mining and Metals
- International Electrical Testing Association
- International Housewares Association
- International Imaging Industry Association
- Juvenile Products Manufacturers Association
- Metal Building Manufacturers Association
- Mineral Information Institute
- National Automatic Merchandising Association (NAMA)
- National Cotton Council of America
- National Defense Industrial Association
- National Electrical Manufacturers Association
- National Retail Federation
- National Stone, Sand & Gravel Association
- Plumbing Manufacturers International
- Professional Electrical Apparatus Recyclers League
- Professional Photographers of America
- Resilient Floor Covering Institute
- Security Industry Association
- Society of Chemical Manufacturers and Affiliates
- TAPPI (Technical Association of the Pulp and Paper Industry)

=== IT, communications and electronics ===
- American Council for Technology and Industry Advisory Council
- Chamber of Progress
- Computer & Communications Industry Association
- CompTIA (Computing Technology Industry Association)
- Consumer Technology Association
- CTIA (– The Wireless Association)
- Electronic Industries Alliance
- Federation of Internet Solution Providers of the Americas
- Information Technology Industry Council
- International Informix Users Group
- International Interactive Communications Society
- Fiber Optic Sensing Association
- International Webmasters Association
- JEDEC Solid State Technology Association
- Open Mashup Alliance
- Satellite Broadcasting and Communications Association
- SD Association
- Society for Information Management
- Storage Networking Industry Association
- TechAmerica
- Trusted Computing Group
- United States Telecom Association

=== Media ===
- Alliance of Motion Picture and Television Producers
- American Association of Independent Music
- American Booksellers Association
- American Publishers Association
- American Society of Magazine Editors
- Association for International Broadcasting
- Association of American Publishers
- Association of Comics Magazine Publishers
- Association of Learned and Professional Society Publishers
- Audio Visual and Integrated Experience Association
- Book Industry Study Group
- Community Broadcasters Association
- Evangelical Press Association
- Free Speech Coalition
- IABM (International Association for Broadcast & Media Technology Suppliers)
- Independent Book Publishers Association
- Independent Film & Television Alliance
- Inland Press Association
- International Association of Scientific, Technical, and Medical Publishers
- Motion Picture Association of America
- MPA – the Association of Magazine Media
- National Association of Broadcasters
- Print Services & Distribution Association
- Printing Industries of America
- Producers Guild of America
- Recording Industry Association of America
- Screen Actors Guild

=== Tobacco, alcohol, law, politics, gambling and firearms ===
- American Association of Political Consultants
- American Association of Professional Landmen
- American Bar Association
- American Land Title Association
- Council on State Taxation
- National Shooting Sports Foundation
- Tobacco Institute
- National Defense Industrial Association
- National Rifle Association of America

=== Transport and logistics ===
- Aerospace Industries Association
- Airports Council International
- Alliance of Automobile Manufacturers
- American Association of Port Authorities
- American Bus Association
- American Moving & Storage Association
- American Public Transportation Association
- American Railway Association
- American Road and Transportation Builders Association
- American Trucking Associations
- American Waterways Operators
- Association of American Railroads
- AutoCare Association
- Automobile Manufacturers Association
- Automotive Industry Action Group
- Commercial Spaceflight Federation
- Driving Schools Association of the Americas
- Modification and Replacement Parts Association
- Motorcycle Industry Council
- National Automobile Dealers Association
- National Motor Freight Traffic Association
- Personal Watercraft Industry Association
- Railway Tie Association
- SEMA (Specialty Equipment Market Association)

== State and local ==
=== Media ===
- Alabama Broadcasters Association
- California Newspaper Publishers Association
- Kansas Association of Broadcasters
- Massachusetts Broadcasters Association
- Michigan Association of Broadcasters
- Minnesota Public Television Association
- Pennsylvania Association of Broadcasters
- Pennsylvania NewsMedia Association

=== Other ===
- Austin Independent Business Alliance
- California Avocado Commission
- California Building Industry Association
- Georgia Hospital Association
- Independent Petroleum Association of Mountain States
- Massachusetts Bar Association
- Ohio Credit Union System
- Pacific Maritime Association
- Southern United States Trade Association
- Tavern League of Wisconsin
- Tech Council of Maryland
- Texas and Southwestern Cattle Raisers Association
- Western States Petroleum Association
- Wyoming Stock Growers Association
