= IWA =

IWA or Iwa may refer to:

== Organizations ==
=== International ===
- Institute of World Affairs
- International Water Association
- International Webmasters Association
- International Woodworkers of America, United States and Canada
- International Workers Association, an anarcho-syndicalist federation of labour unions
- International Workingmen's Association (1864–1876), also known as the First International

=== United Kingdom ===
- Indian Workers' Association
- Inland Waterways Association, a canal charity
- Institute of Welsh Affairs, a policy think-tank

=== Elsewhere ===
- Independent Wrestling Association Mid-South, United States
- Indonesian Women's Alliance, a political group representing around 90 organisations in Indonesia
- International Wrestling Alliance, Canada
- International Wrestling Association (disambiguation), various national bodies
- Irish Wheelchair Association, Ireland

== People ==
- Princess Iwa (died 347), Japanese princess and empress consort of Emperor of Japan Nintoku
- Iwa Koesoemasoemantri (1899–1971), Indonesian politician
- Iwa K, Indonesian rapper, singer, songwriter, TV presenter and actor Iwa Kusuma (born 1970)
- Iwa Moto, stage name of Japanese–Philippine actress, model and reality television personality Aileen Quimado Iwamoto (born 1988)
- Uryu Iwako (1829–1897), also known as Uryū Iwa, Japanese social worker
- Iwa Wanja, Bulgarian actress born Ivanka Nikolova Yanakieva (1905–1991)

== Places ==
- Iwa, Nepal, a defunct municipality (village development committee)
- Iwa, Nigeria, a village - see List of villages in Oyo State (postal code 202111)
- Iwa Island, Papua New Guinea

== Other uses ==
- Great frigatebird (Hawaiian: 'iwa), an avian species
- Hurricane Iwa, a late-1982 storm on the Hawaiian Islands
- Iwa, a dialect of the Mwanga language, spoken in Zambia
- IWA OutdoorClassics, an arms trade show held annually in Nuremberg, Germany
- Integrated Windows Authentication, Microsoft term for a set of protocols
- International Workshop Agreement, a stage of ISO's standardization process
- IWA, FAA code for Phoenix-Mesa Gateway Airport, Mesa, Arizona, United States

== See also ==
- Iwa Shrine, a Shinto shrine in the city of Shisō, Hyōgo Prefecture, Japan
