= Kent Systems =

KENT Systems is a plastic injection molding company in Loveland, Colorado. KENT Systems has a line of patented plastic quick coupling, plastic fittings, media bags, and tubing. KENT Systems was designed, created, and developed by Kent Sampson. Kent Sampson along with his wife, Gloria, founded Value Plastics in Fort Collins, Colorado. While owning Value Plastics, Kent Sampson invented the KENT Systems line of quick couplings. In 1998 Kent and Gloria were the first business owners to win the prestigious Bravo! Lifetime Achievement Award presented by the Northern Colorado Business Report. In 2001 Kent and Gloria Sampson decided spin off the KENT Systems product line and create a separate company from Value Plastics, the newly formed company was named Kent Systems. In 2007 Kent and Gloria Sampson sold KENT Systems to their youngest son, Lyle, and daughter in-law, Linda.
