= Travel Promotion Act of 2009 =

- Enacted by: the 111th United States Congress

Citations
- Public law: 111-145

Codification
- Titles amended: 8 U.S.C.: Aliens and Nationality; 22 U.S.C.: Foreign Relations and Intercourse
- U.S.C. sections created: 22 U.S.C. § 2123, § 2123a, § 2131
- U.S.C. sections amended: 8 U.S.C. § 1187(h)(3)(B)

Legislative history
- Introduced in the House by Bob Brady (D–PA) on March 4, 2009; Committee consideration by House Administration; Passed the House on March 31, 2009 (416–1); Passed the Senate on October 29, 2009 (unanimous consent) with amendment; House agreed to Senate amendment on November 6, 2009 (voice vote) with further amendment; Senate agreed to House amendment on February 25, 2010 (78–18); Signed into law by President Barack Obama on March 4, 2010

The Travel Promotion Act of 2009 (Pub. L. 111–145 (text) (PDF), Sec. 9) is a law creating the Corporation for Travel Promotion (d.b.a. Brand USA), a public-private partnership tasked with promoting tourism in the United States. To fund the Corporation's activities, the Act provides for a fee of $10 for use of the Electronic System for Travel Authorization (ESTA). Additionally, the Act authorizes a further charge to recover the costs of providing and administrating the ESTA.

The House passed the bill by a vote of 358–66 in November 2009, and the Senate followed on February 25, 2010 with a vote of 78–18. President Barack Obama signed the bill into law on March 4, 2010.

U.S. Customs and Border Protection has announced they will levy an additional $4 fee (bringing the total to $14) for visitors to the United States for the cost of administering the ESTA.

The reactions of the European Union have been critical and suggestions of a similar fee have been raised on grounds of reciprocity.

== Brand USA ==
Brand USA (formerly Corporation for Travel Promotion) gets matching funds from the federal government equivalent to what it raises from the private sector, not to exceed a maximum of $100 million.

== Related legislation ==
On July 22, 2014, the House voted to pass the Travel Promotion, Enhancement, and Modernization Act of 2014 (H.R. 4450; 113th Congress), a bill that would extend the provisions of the Travel Promotion Act of 2009, which established the Corporation for Travel Promotion, through September 30, 2020, and impose new performance and procurement requirements on the corporation. The American Society of Travel Agents (ASTA) supported the bill. ASTA President Zane Kerby said that the bill "is essential to marketing the United States as a desirable destination for international tourists, conferences and business." The U.S. Travel Association also supported the bill. One study of the program by Oxford Economics indicated that the program "generates an estimated $47 in economic benefits for every $1 spent on travel promotion."
