= Blue Ridge Marathon on the Parkway =

- Date: April 24, 2010
- Location: Roanoke, Virginia, United States
- Event type: Road
- Distance: Marathon
- Established: 2010
- Website: Blue Ridge Marathon

The Blue Ridge Marathon - America's Toughest Road Marathon - is an annual marathon, half marathon, 10K, team relay, and double marathon held in both Roanoke and Roanoke County, Virginia, United States. Officially announced on August 12, 2009, the inaugural event occurred on April 24, 2010. The course starts in Downtown Roanoke and finishes in Elmwood Park. The beneficiary of the marathon is the Friends of the Blue Ridge Parkway, a group dedicated to the preservation of the Blue Ridge Parkway.

== The Course ==
The 26.2-mile (42.2 km) course starts in Elmwood Park in Downtown Roanoke. From the start, the course turns to the south along Virginia State Route 116 (Jefferson Street) prior to beginning the ascent up Mill Mountain along Walnut Street. From Mill Mountain, the course continues in a southwesterly course to the Blue Ridge Parkway, where the ascent up Roanoke Mountain begins at the 5.5-mile (8.9 km) mark. Following the descent down the mountain, runners reenter the Parkway and make the descent down Mill Mountain near the Mill Mountain Star. After the descent, runners then wind along the Roanoke River and through the South Roanoke, Wasena and West End neighborhoods prior to reaching the finish in Elmwood Park. The race has a total elevation change on 7,430 feet.

== History ==
The first marathon held in Roanoke was organized by the local running organization, the Star City Striders, and held in 1983 as the Star City Marathon. The event would be held again in 1984 before being shortened to a half marathon in 1985 due to severe flooding resulting from Hurricane Juan. The marathon returned in 1986, but was discontinued the following year and replaced with an annual half marathon and 5K. The announcement in August 2009 for the 2010 event marked the return of a marathon to the Roanoke Valley for the first time since the 1986 event.

Announced on August 12, 2009, by Roanoke representative Bob Goodlatte, securing a portion of the Blue Ridge Parkway to hold the event involved a bi-partisan effort from congresspersons whose districts the Parkway traverses. In addition to Goodlatte, representatives Rick Boucher Tom Perriello, Virginia Foxx, Patrick McHenry and Heath Shuler all gave their support to for holding the event. The inaugural 2010 event was scheduled to coincide with the 75th anniversary of the Blue Ridge Parkway and be included as part of the year-long celebration. In 2010, the official event name was the Blue Ridge Marathon on the Parkway, but in 2011 the name was shortened to Blue Ridge Marathon and is also known as Foot Levelers Blue Ridge Marathon because of title sponsor, Foot Levelers, Inc (since 2012).

The race is put on by the Roanoke Outside Foundation, a nonprofit with a mission of connecting people outdoors. The Roanoke Outside Foundation was created as an economic development initiative by the Roanoke Regional Partnership to leverage natural assets to attract talent and investment to the region.

The inaugural race was held on Saturday, April 24, 2010, with 324 runners completing the marathon and 450 completing the half-marathon.

The annual streak of races was broken in 2020 due to the COVID-19 pandemic. In early March, the Centers for Disease Control suggested the cancelation of all gatherings of 50 or more people. As a result, on March 16, the race organizers canceled the 10th running of the Blue Ridge Marathon as well as all other races held that weekend.

== Marathon winners ==
Year	Race	Athlete	Country/State	Time	Notes
2010	Men's	Tim Sykes	United States (VA)	2:42:17	
2010	Women's	Karen Ostergaard	United States (NC)	3:30:14	
2011	Men's	Michael Dixon	United States (NJ)	2:41:26	
2011	Women's	Nicole Terry	United States (VA)	3:19:27	
2012	Men's	Karsten Brown	United States (VA)	3:01:38	
2012	Women's	Lauren Bosshardt	United States (GA)	3:32:50	
2013	Men's	Jeff Powers	United States (PA)	2:39:49	
2013	Women's	Heather Wesolovski	United States (NY)	3:24:25	
2014	Men's	Jeff Powers	United States (PA)	2:52:25	
2014	Women's	Lorraine Young	United States	3:13:48	
2015	Men's	Masashi Shirotake	United States (NC)	2:49:33	
2015	Women's	Amy Ostrofe	United States (VA)	3:25:19	
2016	Men's	Jeff Powers	United States (PA)	2:48:34	
2016	Women's	Amy Ostrofe	United States (VA)	3:19:13	
2017	Men's	Tim Gruber	United States (VA)	3:00:54	
2017	Women's	Sarah Glenn	United States (VA)	3:28:44	
2018	Men's	Tim Gruber	United States (VA)	2:44:51	
2018	Women's	Mary Sketch	United States (VA)	3:18:57	
2019	Men's	McLane Grow	United States (VA)	3:08:58	
2019	Women's	Christina Sumner	United States (VA)	3:46:53	
2020	Men's	Race canceled due to the COVID-19 pandemic			
2020	Women's	Race canceled due to the COVID-19 pandemic			
2021	Men's	Aaron Spak	United States (VA)	2:53:37	
2021	Women's	Hana Baskin	United States (NC)	3:19:21	
2022	Men's	Nathaniel Wooden	United States (VA)	3:12:37	
2022	Women's	Hana Baskin	United States (NC)	3:18:14	
2024	Men's	Joseph Darwin	United States (VA)	2:44:02	
2024	Women's	Amy Johnson	United States (NC)	3:29:54	
2025	Men's	Eli Roberson	United States (VA)	2:56:25	
2025	Women's	Emily Sharp	United States (NC)	3:17:42	

== Course records ==
The full and half marathon courses were altered and USATF certified in 2014.

DOUBLE MARATHON

Male: Michael Fisher (age 34), Asheville, NC. Time: 8:05:02 (2018)

Female: Margaret Smith (age 37), Baltimore, MD. Time: 9:10:13 (2017)

FULL MARATHON

Male: Tim Gruber (age 23), Richmond, VA. Time: 2:44:48 (2018)

Female: Lorraine Young (age 40), Raleigh, NC. Time: 3:13:46 (2014)

HALF MARATHON

Male: Tyler Obrien (age 21), Jacksonville, FL. Time: 1:21:57 (2016)

Female: Mina Demarco (age 30). Time: 1:31:41 (2014)

STAR 10k

Male: Tyler O’Brien (age 23). Jacksonville, FL. Time: 34:51 (2018)

Female: Sarah Glenn (33). Roanoke, VA. Time: 42:26 (2018)

4-PERSON RELAY RECORD

Rich's Bich's. Time: 3:32:47 (2017)
