= IAEC =

IAEC may refer to:

- Inter-American Economic Council
- International Association of Elevator Consultants
- International Association of Evangelical Chaplains
- Israel Atomic Energy Commission
