= BPSA =

BPSA may mean:

- Baden-Powell Scouts' Association
- Baden-Powell Service Association (Canada)
- Baden-Powell Service Association (United States)
- Bio Process Systems Alliance
- Bermuda Public Services Association
- Bangladesh Police Service Association
- Banca Popolare Sant'Angelo
