= Peter S. Hellman =

American businessman

Peter S. Hellman is an American businessman.

== Biography ==
=== Early life ===
He graduated from Hobart College and received an M.B.A. from Case Western Reserve University.

=== Career ===
From 1972 to 1979, he worked for Irving Trust, and from 1979 to 1989 for BP America. From 1989 to 1999, he worked at TRW Inc., including as chief financial officer from 1991 to 1994, assistant president from 1994 to 1995, and president and chief operating officer from 1995 to 1999. He served as executive vice president and chief financial and administrative officer of the Nordson Corporation from 2000 to 2004, and as president and chief financial and administrative officer from 2004 to 2008. He served on its board of directors from 2001 to 2008.

He sits on the boards of directors of Baxter International (since 2005), the Goodyear Tire and Rubber Company (since 2010), and Owens-Illinois. He has served on the board of Qwest.

He sits on the boards of trustees of the Holden Arboretum and the Cleveland Museum of Natural History. He previously served on the Boards of Case Western Reserve University, LifeBanc and Western Reserve Academy.
