= Value Plastics =

American manufacturing company

- Company type: Subsidiary
- Industry: Manufacturing
- Founded: 1968; 58 years ago
- Headquarters: Loveland, Colorado, United States
- Area served: Worldwide
- Products: Plastic tubing
- Parent: Nordson Corporation
- Website: www.valueplastics.com

Value Plastics was an American company that designed, manufactured, and globally distributed plastic tubing components used mainly in medical device, biotech, and industrial applications. Since 2011 it has operated as a division within Nordson Corporation.

== History ==
The company was started in 1968 in Fort Collins, Colorado and is headquartered in Loveland, Colorado. Their major product lines include Luer, quick connect, threaded, and tube-to-tube fittings, check valves, and bioprocess fittings.

In 2005, American Capital purchased controlling interest in the company, and in 2007, Value Plastics became an active participant on the ISO 80369 committee. Through an alliance of 26 suppliers, Value Plastics is also a founding member of the Bio-Process Systems Alliance (BPSA).

Value Plastics was acquired in September 2011 by Nordson Corporation of Westlake Ohio and is now a division within that company's Advanced Technology Systems operating segment.
