= Worldwide Rail Journeys =

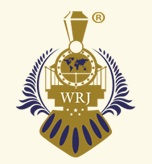

Worldwide Rail Journeys Private Limited is a luxury train journey provider based in India with registered offices in India, UK and Tokyo, Japan.

It is an approved official General Sales Agent (GSA) of Palace on Wheels, Royal Rajasthan on Wheels and Golden Chariot.

WRJ is a certified member of The International Ecotourism Society, American Society of Travel Agents (ASTA), Japan Association of Travel Agents (JATA) and Pacific Asia Travel Association (PATA).

== History ==
The company was established in 2013.

In 2014, it announced its decision to charter Royal Rajasthan on Wheels for ‘Unity Express’ a new luxury train in India inspired by Prime Minister Narendra Modi.

== Awards ==
- ‘Best Brochure – Tour Operator’ at the 30th IATO Convention, 2014 in Kempinski Ambience, Delhi.
- 'Best Rail Tour Operator' award at India Tourism Award in Jaipur 2015
