= Dutko Worldwide =

Dutko Grayling
- Formerly: Dutko Worldwide; The Dutko Group; TDG; TDG Companies
- Type: Private
- Industry: Lobbying firm
- Predecessor: Dutko and Associates
- Founded: 1981; 45 years ago in Washington D.C., United States
- Founder: Dan Dutko
- Headquarters: Washington D.C., United States
- Website: dutkoworldwide.com

Dutko Worldwide (DW), now Dutko Grayling formerly The Dutko Group, TDG, or TDG Companies, is a Washington, DC–based bipartisan lobbying firm that offers "comprehensive public policy management." DW's services include "Issues and opportunities assessment, Strategy Development, Crisis Management, Execution of sound public policy management programs." It identifies its core issue areas as "Appropriations, Technology, Telecommunications, Health Care, Energy, Financial Services, International Trade, Environmental Regulation, Corporate and Global Tax Policy, Sustainable Development."

== History ==
Dutko Worldwide was founded by Dan Dutko as the lobbying firm Dutko and Associates in 1981. DW later expanded to become The Dutko Group Companies. Dan Dutko stressed the importance of relationship-building to lobbying: "Even those who oppose our initiatives today may eventually become allies who will support our initiatives tomorrow. The extended hand of mutual respect, even among adversaries, opens more doors than an iron fist."

In 2008, Dutko Worldwide reported $20.3 million in federal lobbying income, a decrease of 9% from 2007.

In late 2009, Huntsworth, the UK-based global public relations and health care communications group, acquired Dutko Worldwide to become Huntsworth's primary public affairs brand.

In 2019, DC–based Dutko Grayling lobbying firm reported 4 lobbyists and $2,280,000 in lobbying expenditures, down from 64 lobbyists and $22,771,500 in lobbying expenditures in 2007.

== Campaigns and clients ==
=== Industry-supported "consumer" groups ===
According to The Hill Staff's biweekly listing of the top lobbyists in a specific industry DW was one of the major contributors in developing the Consumer Alliance for Affordable Natural Gas, an effort launched by major chemical companies that want to reach a critical lobbying mass by joining industry and consumer groups together in a campaign to lower natural-gas prices. Companies such as American Chemistry Council, American Forest and Paper Association, Dow Chemical, DuPont, Rohm and Haas, and the Society of Plastic Industries want to cut the rising price of natural gas - which the companies use both to fuel plant production and as a feedstock for their products — by encouraging more drilling and new conservation efforts.

=== Election-related activity ===
According to the Center for Public Integrity, DW has also received payment from some 527 groups, including the Democratic Attorneys General Association, Inc. and the National Conference of Democratic Mayors. DW, in turn, donated to several 527s, including the Republican Governors Association, the Democratic Governors Association, DASHPAC – Nonfederal Account, and the Rely on Your Beliefs Fund. Individuals associated with DW donated more than $267,000 to federal candidates and parties during the 2004 elections; the firm does not have an associated political action committee.

=== Industry clients ===
Top Dutko Worldwide clients include many telecom and media companies, like AT&T Wireless, Level 3 Communications Inc., Sprint, Satellite Broadcasting & Communication Association, Comptel/ASCENT, Cumulus Media and Time Warner.

Other DW clients listed on the Lobbyist.info database include Accenture, American Chemistry Council, American International Group, Biotechnology Research & Development Center, Bristol-Myers Squibb, CITGO Petroleum, the Coalition for Auto Repair Equality, the Coalition for Highway 36, the Coalition for the Advancement of Housing Research, Correctional Services Corporation, Democratic Leadership Council, Fisher Scientific Company, the Gay Lesbian Straight Education Network, Genentech, Eli Lilly and Company, Kmart Corporation, Microsoft, the National Petrochemical Refiners Association, Ogilvy PR, Personal Watercraft Industry Association, Prudential Financial, PSEG Services, Senior Care Pharmacy Alliance, Target, and the U.S. Small Manufacturing Coalition.
