= NBFA =

NBFA can refer to:

- National Benevolent Fund for the Aged, London-based charity
- National Black Farmers Association, for African American farmers in the United States
- National Business Forms Association, original name of Print Services & Distribution Association
- Newport Beach Firefighters Association, supporting Newport Beach Fire Department
