= 2006 G20 ministerial meeting =

Opening of G-20 Meeting

The 2006 G20 Meeting of Finance Ministers and Central Bank Governors was held in Melbourne, Australia between 18 and 19 November 2006. Issues discussed included "the outlook for the global economy; developments in resource markets and ways to improve their efficiency; the impact of demographic change on global financial markets; and further reform of the International Monetary Fund and the World Bank."

== Venue ==
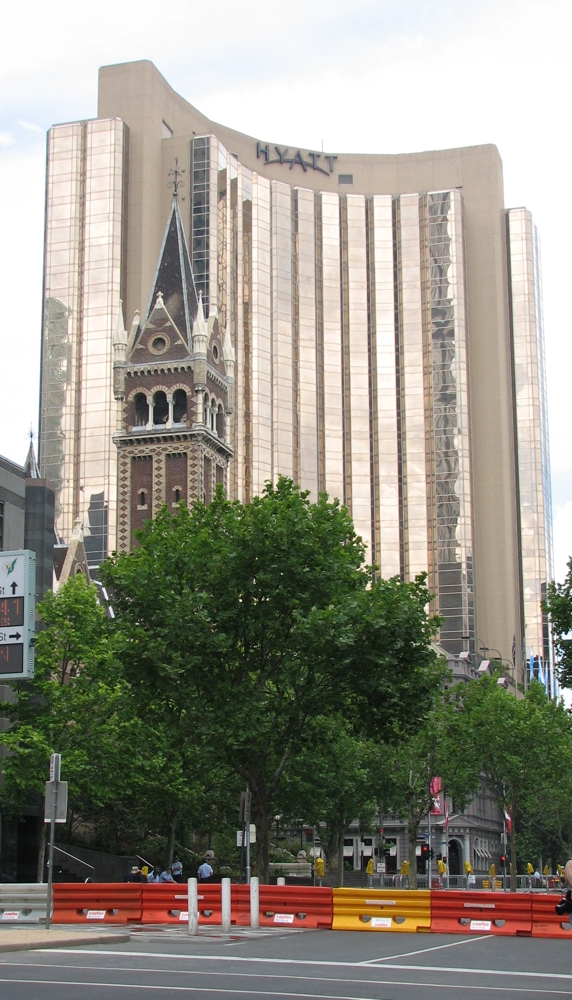
Police roadblock near the Grand Hyatt

The Grand Hyatt Melbourne Hotel on Collins Street was the venue for most of the events and was also the location where most of the dignitaries stayed.

== Security ==
Security throughout Melbourne was extremely tight for the duration of the summit. As of midnight 14 November parking was banned throughout the eastern CBD surrounding the Grand Hyatt.

Concern had been sparked that Victoria Police may be overstretched due to the large number of events in Melbourne that weekend, on top of the G20 summit there was a U2 concert at Docklands Stadium and a Make Poverty History Concert at the Sidney Myer Music Bowl. Victoria Police also warned that protesters may attempt to occupy inner-city buildings, and they recommended "corporations (should) consider hiring extra security."

== G20 Meeting ==
In a first for the G20 meeting, an elite business group was able to address the Finance Ministers and Reserve Bank leaders. A new organisation, the Energy and Minerals Business Council comprising BHP Billiton, Rio Tinto and many of the world's most powerful mining and oil companies met in the same hotel and could lobby G20 delegates over a business lunch.

The meeting of finance ministers in their communique called for free markets in oil and other forms of energy, and warned that economic policy needed to be tightened to reign in big deficits and 'easy money'. "We need to take advantage of the present strength in the global economy to get policy settings right," they declared in their statement.

The ministers rejected Australia's timetable for reforming the International Monetary Fund and the World Bank, but reiterated their commitment to reform.

Climate change was not on the formal agenda, but a strong push by chief secretary to the British Treasury, Stephen Timms forced global warming and the Stern Review on the Economics of Climate Change to be briefly discussed as part of the context of promoting free markets as the way to energy security. The G20 communique said "We discussed the links between energy and climate change policy, including the role of market-based mechanisms, and agreed that the G-20 would monitor this issue."

Development aid was also given only brief discussion despite calls for development aid to be increased by Oxfam and other non-governmental organisations.

== Protests ==
On Friday the 17th there were several invasions in buildings by small bands of protesters in Melbourne, such as Orica House where over 100 protesters occupied the chemical services department, delivering a letter to the general manager for mining chemicals, and faxing it to communities along a cyanide transport route. All ANZ branches in the Melbourne CBD were closed during the afternoon of 17 November due to protest action against ANZ investment in military industries.

=== Behaviour of protestors ===
The main anti-globalisation protest was organised by the StopG20 coalition for Saturday 18 November. This march stopped at the police barricades in Russell Street where a festive carnival atmosphere prevailed. Some protesters moved to other streets, where confrontations with the police occurred, while most protesters who went to the main rally and march went home never being aware of the confrontations on other streets until they watched the news that evening.

On Collins and Russell Streets, barricades were ripped down and pushed at riot police who were called in to help quell the situation. A militant group of protesters known as the Arterial Bloc, dressed in white clothing with hoods covering their faces, collected industrial bins and dumpsters and used Melbourne's tram tracks to slide them into barricades and police, resulting in minor injuries to several police, the most serious being a broken wrist. At one stage a police riot truck was attacked with its windows smashed. By 15:00 local time, the nearby Grand Hyatt had gone into 'lock down'. The organizers of the protesters had expected up to 10,000 people to come, however the number of people that showed was slightly over 3,000.

=== Police response ===
A preliminary report by an independent human rights observer team noted "high level overall of police discipline and restraint in the face of deliberately provocative actions by some protesters, lasting many hours" and "Police command were seen to be encouraging the consideration of force as a staged option, rather than as a first response, which is to be commended." However the report noted that "Our timeline analysis points to a decline in police restraint over a period of time".

On Sunday police executed a baton charge against a group of anti-G20 protesters at the Melbourne Museum causing injuries to one person requiring an ambulance. The same day, non-uniformed police detained a man, Drasko Bolejevic, after he was mistakenly identified as being involved with the G20 protests. Mr Bolejevic alleged he was abused and assaulted before being released from custody without charge two hours later.

=== Operation Salver ===
Victoria Police set up Operation Salver to investigate further possible charges from the G20 protest. In January 2007 police released to the media 28 photos of 'persons of interest' to their investigation. As of March 2007, 40 people have been arrested over the protest on charges including riot, affray, and criminal damage.

== Participating members ==
G20 countries:

1. Argentina
2. Australia
3. Brazil
4. Canada
5. China
6. European Union, including
7. France
8. Germany
9. Italy
10. Turkey
11. India
12. Indonesia
13. Japan
14. Mexico
15. Russia
16. Saudi Arabia
17. South Africa
18. South Korea
19. United Kingdom
20. United States

== See also ==
- G20 developing nations
