= American Society of Safety Professionals =

Professional organization

- Abbreviation: ASSP
- Founded: 25 March 1911
- Type: Nongovernmental Organization
- Location: Park Ridge, IL
- Executive Director: Jennifer McNelly
- Website: www.assp.org

The American Society of Safety Professionals (ASSP), formerly known as American Society of Safety Engineers (ASSE), is a global organization of occupational safety and health (OSH) professional members who manage, supervise, research and consult on work-related OSH concerns across all industries. Society members use risk-based approaches to prevent workplace fatalities, injuries and illnesses.

The organization was founded on 25 March 1911 in the wake of the Triangle Shirtwaist Factory fire, after lack of safety measures caused the death of 146 garment workers.

ASSP offers continuing education to OSH professionals, participates in developing industry standards, pursues initiatives that aim to build the reputation of the OSH profession, and provides access to various member communities. The organization has alliances with federal agencies such as Occupational Safety and Health Administration (OSHA) and National Institute for Occupational Safety and Health (NIOSH). ASSP also works with the Accreditation Board for Engineering & Technology (ABET) to develop accreditation standards for OSH-related degree programs and has worked with the International Network of Safety and Health Practitioner Organizations (INSHPO) to develop a professional capability framework for OSH professionals.

== Organization ==
The American Society of Safety Professionals has 151 local chapters, 40 sections and 65 student sections located across 75 countries. Members live in regions including the Americas, Europe, the Middle East, Africa, Asia and Australia.

The ASSP has specialty communities that focus on particular industries or fields of professional practice, including academia, construction, consulting, engineering, environment, ergonomics, fire protection, healthcare, industrial hygiene, international, management, manufacturing, oil, gas, mining and minerals, public sector, risk management/insurance and transportation. The organization also has four common interest groups – Blacks in Safety Excellence (BISE), Hispanic Safety Professionals, Women in Safety Excellence (WISE) and Young Professionals in OSH.

== Consensus Standards ==
ASSP is secretariat for several American National Standards Institute (ANSI) committees and administrator for the United States technical advisory groups (TAG) to the International Organization for Standardization (ISO) on fall protection, risk management and occupational health and safety management systems. Members represent the organization on a wide range of safety and health committees affiliated with standards-development organizations such as National Fire Protection Association (NFPA), International Safety Equipment Association (ISEA) and ASTM International.

The committees develop and maintain the standards, ensure that the revision process is timely and in accordance with ANSI procedures, and publish the final product. ASSP is secretariat or administrator for the U.S. TAG for the following standards:

- Confined Spaces (Z117)
- Construction and Demolition Operations (A10)
- Fall Protection and Fall Restraint (Z359)
- Fleet Safety (Z15)
- Hydrogen Sulfide Training (Z390)
- Lockout/Tagout and Alternative Methods (Z244)
- Occupational Health and Safety Management Systems (Z10, ISO 45001)
- OSH Training (Z490)
- Prevention Through Design (Z590.3)
- Risk Management (ISO 31000/ANSI/ASSP Z690)
- Scope and Functions of the Professional Safety Position (Z590.2)
- Ventilation Systems (Z9)
- Walking/Working Surfaces (A1264)

== Center for Safety and Health Sustainability ==
The Center for Safety and Health Sustainability is a global collaborative effort among ASSP, the American Industrial Hygiene Association (AIHA), and the United Kingdom’s Institution of Occupational Safety and Health (IOSH). Its work focuses on improving corporate recognition of employee safety, health, and well-being as a sustainable business practice.

== ASSP Foundation ==
The American Society of Safety Professionals Foundation, established by the ASSP, generates funding and provides resources for research opportunities, educational advancement and leadership development to advance the OSH profession. As a 501(c)(3) organization, contributions to the Foundation are generally considered charitable contributions under IRC Section 170 and are tax deductible as provided by law.

== See also ==
- Loss-control consultant
- American Society of Mechanical Engineers
- ASSE-MEC
