= Irrigation Association =

The Irrigation Association is a trade association of about 1800 companies in the agriculture and landscape industries. It was established in 1949.

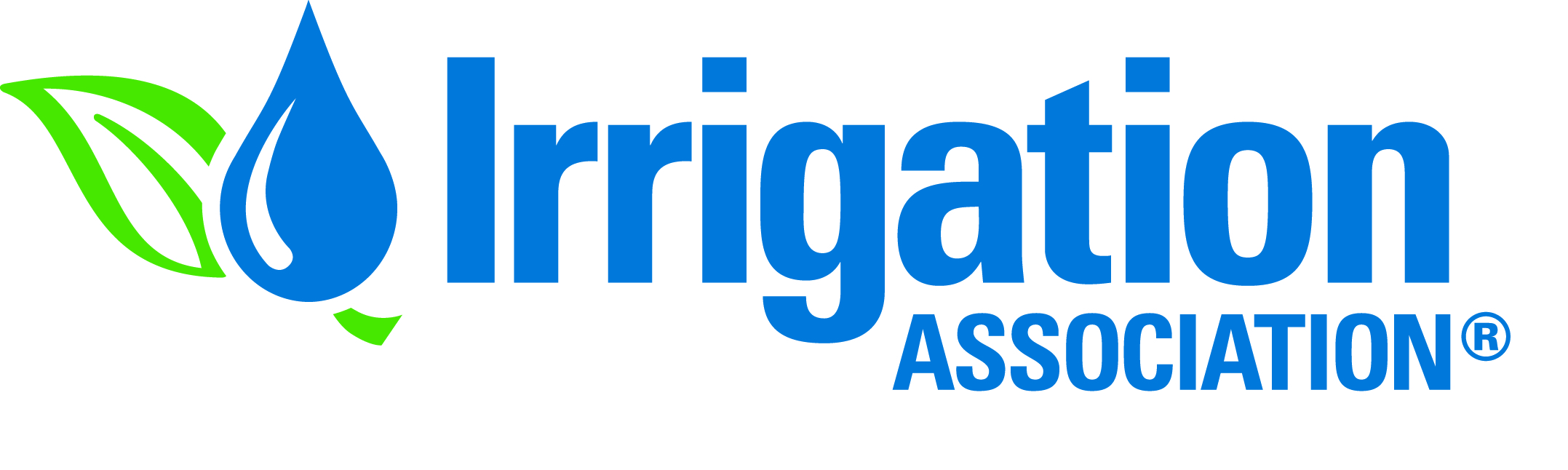
Irrigation Association logo

Certified irrigation designers with a specialty in sprinkler, surface or drip-micro qualify to become Technical Service Providers for U.S. Department of Agriculture (USDA) projects through the Natural Resources Conservation Service.

In September 2010, the Irrigation Association began offering computer-based testing for certification exams.

== Smart Irrigation Month ==
In 2010 the association named July "Smart Irrigation Month" in order to promote water conservation in that month. John Linder submitted a resolution to Congress in support of the initiative.

== Political advocacy ==
=== Opposition to right-to-repair legislation ===
In July 2024, the Irrigation Association signed a letter to members of both the House Committee on Armed Services and the Senate Committee on Armed Services opposing Section 828 of S. 4628, the National Defense Authorization Act for Fiscal Year 2025, entitled "Requirement for Contractors to Provide Reasonable Access to Repair Materials," which would require contractors doing business with the US military to agree "to provide the Department of Defense fair and reasonable access to all the repair materials, including parts, tools, and information, used by the manufacturer or provider or their authorized partners to diagnose, maintain, or repair the good or service."
