= Print Solutions Magazine =

- Editor: John Delavan, Editor-in-chief
- Former editors: Brad Holt/ Kristin Quinnr; Krista Scarlett, Assistant Editor
- Categories: Print products & services
- Frequency: Monthly
- Circulation: 9600
- Publisher: Matt Sanderson, Executive Vice President
- Founded: 1962
- Company: Print Services & Distribution Association
- Country: United States of America
- Based in: Chicago, IL
- Language: English
- Website: printsolutionsmag.com
- ISSN: 1535-9727

Print Solutions Magazine is a monthly trade publication that covers the print distribution industry. It has been published continuously since 1962 by the Print Services & Distribution Association (PSDA), though it was previously known as FORM Magazine. It has won more than 100 awards and is read by over 32,400 professionals in the printing industry. Each issue of Print Solutions Magazine contains relevant industry news as well as sales, marketing and management features to help readers improve their businesses, expand into new markets and learn ways to sell print products and related services.

== Special Feature Issues ==
=== Top 100 Print Distributors ===
The annual Top 100 Print Distributors issue ranks the top distributors in the nation by fiscal year sales. It also includes the fastest-growing small distributors, the top sales per employee and feature articles on various businesses on the list. The Top 100 Print Distributors list is, “renowned as the most accurate, definitive and coveted list of its kind...”

=== Top 100 Trade Printers ===
The Top 100 Trade Printers list is generated from year-over-year sales data that is sent in to Print Solutions Magazine editors from over 100 printers throughout the country. As this issue is published annually, it is commonly used by professionals in the print industry as a yearly reference point for conducting business.

=== Annual Buyer's Guide ===
The Print Solutions Buyer’s Guide is a directory of industry providers that is published annually by Print Solutions Magazine. It is divided into two alphabetized sections: The Product Index lists various products and services while the Company Directory provides a catalog of manufacturers and suppliers.

=== Official Show Guide for the Print Solutions Conference & Expo ===
The Official Show Guide for the Print Solutions Conference & Expo includes relevant exhibitor and product information, booth information and floor plans, seminar and meeting details, and a complete event agenda.

== PEAK Awards ==
The Print Excellence and Knowledge (PEAK) Awards is a competition held annually by Print Solutions Magazine that distinguishes exceptional print-related products and services. In 2008, over 250 entries across 42 categories were received from around the world. In each category, one Grand Award Winner is chosen and honored at the annual Print Solutions Conference & Expo during a VIP Awards Ceremony. Grand Award winners receive a trophy and the right to display the PEAK Award Winner logo. Additionally, the PEAK Awards recognize runner-up entries and presents them with an Award of Excellence certificate.
