= Loss-control consultant =

A loss control consultant (also LCC or loss control representative) is someone who possess a demonstrable knowledge and / or education in arts and science of safety engineering and risk management. A typical loss control consultant will possess a college degree in engineering or in business, commercial insurance, industrial safety, industrial hygiene or fire protection.

== Employment ==
The loss control consultant will typically work for an insurance company, a private consultant firm or as an independent consultant. The LCC will survey businesses for property or casualty (general liability, automobile, workers compensation) exposures, identifying exposures to loss and how a business can control these loss exposures. If deficient in protecting for a loss exposure, recommendations for improvement will be offered. Underwriting information concerning an account's operation, size, area served and cooperation with the loss control consultant is developed and submitted in a report to the requesting party.

== Education ==
The Insurance Institute of America provides training leading to professional designations, such as Associate in Risk Management and Loss Control Management, which a professional loss control consultant may possess. Another credential is the Certified Safety Professional offered through the Board of Certified Safety Professionals. The consultant may be a member of the American Society of Safety Engineers, the National Fire Protection Association, or the American Industrial Hygiene Association. There are other schools and associations offering training and credentials. References a loss control consultant uses will include the Occupational Safety and Health Act regulations, the National Fire Protection Association's fire codes, codes of the American National Standards Institute, local and regional building codes, Federal regulations referencing commercial drivers and similar regulated trades and National Council on Compensation Insurance (NCCI) for Workers Compensation information.
