= Metals Service Center Institute =

American trade association

- Abbreviation: MSCI
- Predecessor: American Horseshoe and Heavy Hardware Association, American Steel Warehouse Association, Steel Service Center Institute
- Merger of: National Association of Aluminum Distributors
- Headquarters: 4201 Euclid Avenue
- Location: Rolling Meadows, Illinois, United States
- Website: www.msci.org

The Metals Service Center Institute (MSCI) is a trade association and nonprofit organization based in Rolling Meadows, Illinois, in the United States. It was established as the American Horseshoe and Heavy Hardware Association in 1909 and was subsequently known as the American Steel Warehouse Association, then the Steel Service Center Institute. The organization's members are primarily metal service centers that inventory and distribute metals for industrial customers and perform first-stage processing. MSCI has approximately 400 members operating from 1,500 locations primarily in North America. MSCI members purchase about 75 million tons of steel, aluminum and other metals from metals producers, with 300,000 customers, primarily businesses in manufacturing and fabrication. The organization formerly produced the trade publication Forward Magazine and issues a monthly "Metals Activity Report".

== History ==
The organization was originally called the American Horseshoe and Heavy Hardware Association when it was founded in 1909. In 1936, the name was changed to the American Steel Warehouse Association. In 1952 it was changed again, to the Steel Service Center Institute, and in 2002 — reflecting that year's merger with the National Association of Aluminum Distributors — the word "steel" was changed to "metals".

Illinois governor Bruce Rauner and former Massachusetts governor Mitt Romney were featured speakers at the organization's annual meeting in 2015.

== Mission ==
The mission of MSCI is promoting the profitability and health of the metals industry and its role in the North American value chain. The organization delivers information, conferences and professional development, including a series of courses in cooperation with Washington University in St. Louis; safety practices studies and guidelines, a safety helpline, and industry benchmarking, and is a voice for the manufacturing industry. In October 2015, MSCI partnered with the National Safety Council as part of the effort to improve safety in the metals industry.

MSCI produces the monthly "Metals Activity Report", which tracks aggregate service center shipments and inventory levels for steel, aluminum, stainless in the United States and Canada. In addition to being used by MSCI members, this report is frequently referenced by market analysts and investors, economists, and the media, and is even cited in U.S. Securities and Exchange Commission (SEC) filings.

MSCI lobbies governmental bodies on behalf of the metals industry. MSCI sometimes also involves itself in legal proceedings on behalf of member businesses or the industry in general, as when it filed an amicus brief in a Clean Air Act case in 2014, or when it filed another amicus brief in a lawsuit involving auto manufacturer Volvo in 2015.

In 2010, MSCI asked American scientist and award-winning science fiction author David Brin "to create a comic book set 20 years from now that discusses the many reasons for US industrial decline... and how it might come back." The resulting graphic novel, with art by Jan Feindt, is called Tinkerers.

== Advocacy ==
In July 2024, MSCI signed a letter to members of both the House Committee on Armed Services and the Senate Committee on Armed Services opposing Section 828 of S. 4628, the National Defense Authorization Act for Fiscal Year 2025, entitled "Requirement for Contractors to Provide Reasonable Access to Repair Materials," which would require contractors doing business with the US military to agree "to provide the Department of Defense fair and reasonable access to all the repair materials, including parts, tools, and information, used by the manufacturer or provider or their authorized partners to diagnose, maintain, or repair the good or service."

== Leadership ==
MSCI's Chief Executive Officer and President is Robert Weidner. Justin Scott is Vice President of Innovation and Analytics, Rose Manfredini is Vice President of Membership and Events; Kathy Spellman is Vice President, Account Management, Ferrous and Affiliates, Julie Thane is Vice President, Account Management Non-Ferrous, Monique Combs is Vice President, Knowledge and Learning, Ryan Hietpas is Executive Director, Digitalization and Technology.

== See also ==
Steel service center
