= National Defense Authorization Act for Fiscal Year 2025 =

United States federal law

Servicemember Quality of Life Improvement and National Defense Authorization Act for Fiscal Year 2025
- Acronyms (colloquial): NDAA

Citations
- Public law: Pub. L. 118–159 (text) (PDF)

Legislative history
- Introduced in the Senate as H.R. 5009 by Tom Carper (D‑DE) via Chuck Schumer (D‑NY) on September 24, 2024 from a repurposed House bill.; Committee consideration by House and Senate Armed Services; Passed the House of Representatives on December 11, 2024 (281-140); Passed the Senate on December 18, 2024 (85 - 14); Signed into law by President Joe Biden on December 23, 2024

The National Defense Authorization Act for Fiscal Year 2025 (NDAA 2025) is a United States federal law which specifies the budget, expenditures, and policies of the U.S. Department of Defense (DOD) for fiscal year 2025.

== Provisions ==
The act would ban TRICARE from covering gender-affirming care for minors.

The 2025 NDAA extended the Uyghur Human Rights Policy Act to 2030. It also prevents the U.S. military from sourcing products prohibited by the Uyghur Forced Labor Prevention Act anywhere in the world.

The act posthumously advanced Air Force General John D. Lavelle's retired rank from major general to lieutenant general.

The act requires maintaining a human in the loop for nuclear weapons employment, as part of section 1638 of the law:

SEC. 1638. SENSE OF CONGRESS WITH RESPECT TO USE OF ARTIFICIAL INTELLIGENCE TO SUPPORT STRATEGIC DETERRENCE.

(a) Sense of Congress.—It is the sense of Congress that—

(1) the considered use of artificial intelligence and machine learning tools presents opportunities to strengthen the security of critical strategic communications and early warning networks, improve the efficiency of planning processes to reduce the risk of collateral damage, and enhance U.S. capabilities for modeling weapons functionality in support of stockpile stewardship; and

(2) even with such applications, particular care must be taken to ensure that the incorporation of artificial intelligence and machine learning tools does not increase the risk that our Nation’s most critical strategic assets can be compromised.

(b) Statement of Policy.—It is the policy of the United States that the use of artificial intelligence efforts should not compromise the integrity of nuclear safeguards, whether through the functionality of weapons systems, the validation of communications from command authorities, or the principle of requiring positive human actions in execution of decisions by the President with respect to the employment of nuclear weapons.

== Legislative history ==
The National Defense Authorization Act is an annual bill proposed in the United States Congress that redefines the United States military budget for the following fiscal year. Each chamber of Congress introduces a version of the NDAA for 2025.

The House introduced H.R. 8070 on April 18, 2024. On May 22, the House Armed Services Committee approved its version by a 57–1 vote. On June 14, the United States House of Representatives passed the US$895 billion defense spending bill in a 217–199 vote. The Senate Armed Services Committee approved the Senate's version of the bill on June 14 in a 22–3 vote. Reed reintroduced the new Senate version as S. 4638 on July 8 which was suspended. On December 7, H.R. 5009 was used as the legislative vehicle for the conference report. The bill passed the House on December 11 by a vote of 281–140. On December 18, the bill passed the Senate by a vote of 85–14.

On December 23, 2024, Biden signed the bill into law, but issued a statement saying he "strongly opposes" the provision restricting coverage of gender-affirming treatments for minors under TRICARE.

== Original proposals ==
=== Republican amendments ===
On May 22, the House Armed Services Committee approved its version of the 2025 National Defense Authorization Act, by a 57–1 vote. As passed by the committee, the bill included the Pentagon's controversial "Legislative Proposal 480", transferring Air National Guard space units to the Space Force; however, the Committee accepted an amendment proposed by Joe Wilson (R‑SC), watering down the Pentagon's proposal by adding a requirement for gubernatorial consent to any such transfers.

On June 14, the United States House of Representatives passed the US$895 billion defense spending bill in a 217–199 vote, with several added socially conservative amendments made by House Republicans that Speaker of the House Mike Johnson approved in order to prevent any hardline Republicans from blocking the bill. All but six House Democrats opposed the bill, while only three House Republicans opposed the bill. Many Democrats criticized the changes and the House Republicans for using the mandatory defense bill to push forward divisive, partisan agendas. Committee Chairman Jack Reed (D‑RI) initially voted against the bill, due to disagreement with the decision to increase defense spending $25 billion over the budget cap established by the Fiscal Responsibility Act; Elizabeth Warren (D‑MA) and Tom Cotton (R‑AR) joined Reed in voting against the bill. The $25 billion spending increase over the cap was due to an amendment introduced by its Ranking Member, Roger Wicker (R‑MS). Reed reintroduced a new Senate version as S. 4638 on July 8 which was suspended. Chuck Schumer (D‑NY) introduced H.R. 5009, which is a repurposed bill once used for the Wildlife Innovation and Longevity Driver Reauthorization Act.

Regarding the Senate Armed Services Committee approved version, amendments would block funding to gender-affirming care for transgender members of the United States Armed Forces, for military diversity, equity, and inclusion programs, for teaching of critical race theory at military academies, climate change efforts, and for any future efforts to help bring Palestinian refugees to the United States. The amendments also planned to block an earlier policy that would reimburse travel for troops needing reproductive care or abortions, and planned to defund the Gaza floating pier.

A White House spokesperson condemned the amendments as prioritizing GOP politics over the safety and needs of US troops, and called it "an unserious effort" that would not pass the Senate without several amendments being removed or altered.

=== Gender-affirming care ===
When the Senate bill was introduced, it was revealed to include a provision restricting gender-affirming care in the military, approved by a vote of the Republican members of the committee with the support of conservative Democratic Senator Joe Manchin. This provision was not mentioned in the summary of the text the committee had released earlier, and the presence of gender-affirming care restrictions in both the House and Senate texts was seen as increasing the odds such a provision would be included in the bill as finally passed.

LGBTQ Nation said that, due to the vague language of the provision, which bans TRICARE coverage of gender dysphoria "treatments that could result in sterilization" for minors, but does not name any specific treatments, it is unclear if the provision will actually be able to ban TRICARE coverage of gender-affirming care for minors since puberty-blocking drugs do not affect fertility. Additionally, medical experts said that gender-affirming treatments do not typically cause sterilization, but LGBTQ+ advocates noted that Republicans intend for the provision to ban coverage for all gender-affirming treatments for minors under TRICARE regardless and worry that the incoming Donald Trump administration will enforce it this way. The provision is estimated to affect between 6,000 and 7,000 military families. However, a 2022 study found that approximately 2,500 children were treated with gender-affirming care through TRICARE in 2017. The provision was opposed by military veterans, families and active-duty service members who have transgender connections. Some military families with transgender kids said that if passed, they would either be forced to leave the military, seek a different insurance provider or pay out of pocket for their child's treatment.

The version of the bill that was negotiated and agreed to by the House and Senate removed provisions that restricted abortion access, DEI programs and gender-affirming care for active-duty service members. However, afterwards, House Speaker Mike Johnson added a provision that would ban TRICARE from covering gender-affirming care for minors which was not in the negotiated version agreed to by the House and Senate. The provision threatened the traditionally bipartisan support of the bill as many democrats said they could not support the bill due to the provision. Over 300 LGBT and human rights organizations including the Human Rights Campaign, the American Civil Liberties Union, the Americans United for Separation of Church and State, Lambda Legal, the Leadership Conference on Civil and Human Rights, the National Center for Lesbian Rights, Planned Parenthood, Reproductive Freedom for All and The Trevor Project voiced opposition to the bill over the provision and urged Congress to vote against it.

On December 16, 2024, Senator Tammy Baldwin and over 20 other Democratic Senators introduced an amendment to the Senate version of the bill removing the restriction on TRICARE coverage for gender-affirming care for minors, however the amendment was never brought up for a vote. On December 18, 2024, the bill passed the Senate by a vote of 85–14 with the provision included. Like the House Democrats who voted in favor of the bill, Senate Democrats who voted in favor of the bill opposed the restrictions on gender-affirming care, but voted in favor of the bill for other things in the bill that they supported.

Many House Democrats who voted in favor of the final bill voiced opposition to the provision, but decided to support the bill for other reasons such as increased pay for service members and financing new military technology. On December 13, 2024, over 40 Senate Democrats signed a letter addressed to the Senate Appropriations Committee leaders urging them to reject new anti-abortion and anti-LGBTQ+ riders in future appropriations bills.

=== Military right-to-repair provision ===
In July 2024, a coalition of industry groups authored a joint letter to members of both the House Armed Services Committee and Senate Armed Services Committee opposing Section 828 of the Senate version of the Act (S. 4638), entitled "Requirement for Contractors to Provide Reasonable Access to Repair Materials," which would require contractors doing business with the US military to agree "to provide the Department of Defense fair and reasonable access to all the repair materials, including parts, tools, and information, used by the manufacturer or provider or their authorized partners to diagnose, maintain, or repair the good or service." The signatories to the letter included the Aerospace Industries Association, Associated Equipment Distributors, Association of Equipment Manufacturers, Association of Home Appliance Manufacturers, Illinois Manufacturers' Association, International Safety Equipment Association, Irrigation Association, Metals Service Center Institute, Motorcycle Industry Council, National Association of Manufacturers, National Defense Industrial Association, National Mining Association, National Shooting Sports Foundation, Pennsylvania Manufacturers' Association, Plumbing Manufacturers International, Security Industry Association, and Wisconsin Manufacturers & Commerce.

=== John D. Lavelle ===
The Senate's version of the 2025 NDAA includes a clause to posthumously advance Air Force General John D. Lavelle's retired rank from major general to lieutenant general, while the House's version would fully restore his four-star general rank on the retire-list. The reconciled bill includes the clause corresponding to the Senate's version.

=== Antisemitism Awareness Act ===
In November 2024, it was reported that Senate Majority Leader Chuck Schumer (D‑NY) wanted to attach the controversial Antisemitism Awareness Act, which the House had passed earlier in the year, to the 2025 NDAA. However, Speaker of the House Mike Johnson (R‑LA) announced that House Republicans would reject the linkage of the two Acts, arguing that it was a scheme for Democratic Senators to avoid having to go on the record as voting for or against it.

=== Selective Service System ===
The Senate version of the NDAA contains a provision expanding selective service registration to women; the House version does not. On December 5, a group of eight GOP senators, led by Missouri's Josh Hawley, sent a letter to the chairs of the House and Senate Armed Services Committees, opposing the inclusion of the provision in the final version of the Bill being negotiated between the House and Senate.
