= Congebec Logistics =

Canadian logistics company

- Type: Private
- Industry: Storage
- Founded: 1974
- Founder: Laurier Pedneault
- Services: Multi-temperature storage, warehousing and distribution.
- Website: https://congebec.com/

Congebec Logistics is a Quebec City, Quebec based company that provides cold and multi-temperature storage, warehousing and distribution services. It is the second largest refrigerated logistics services provider in Canada. Congebec is considered the 11th largest refrigerated storage company in North America and 18th largest in the world by the International Association of Refrigerated Warehouses (IARW).

The company has twelve temperature-controlled facilities across Canada in Boucherville, Sainte-Julie, Montreal, Quebec City, Toronto, Winnipeg, Saskatoon and Calgary with a total of 49,66 million cubic feet (1,406,212) m^{3}) of refrigerated and frozen space. In addition to offering multi-temperature storage and packing services, Congebec also offer logistics and transportation services to its customers.

== History ==
Congebec was founded in 1974 by Laurier Pedneault following the acquisition of a warehouse on Dalhousie street, near Quebec City's old port. In 1997 Congebec purchased its first warehouse in the Montreal region.

In 2002, it was the first phase of construction for the Boucherville warehouse which was the beginning of a strong expansion for Congebec.

In 2004, Congebec purchased the Centre Frigorifique Montérégie, which is now referred to as Sainte-Julie warehouse. In doing so, Congebec also purchased CFM logistics that now is Congebec's transport division. After the acquisition, Congebec became the largest refrigerated warehouse company in Quebec and second largest in Canada. In 2006, the Boucherville warehouse was considerably expanded.

A seventh warehouse was built in Manseau in autumn 2008. This warehouse is almost entirely dedicated to the cranberry industry.

In 2011, Congebec entered the Toronto market with the opening of an 8th refrigerated warehouse strategically located near Pearson Airport, with more than three million cubic feet.

In 2013, Congebec conducted its largest expansion in history by acquiring four Westco Multitemp warehouses located in Calgary, Saskatoon and Winnipeg, which gave Congebec a total of more than 48.3 million cubic feet.

In 2015, Capital régional et coopératif Desjardins (CRCD), a retail fund managed by Canadian private equity firm Desjardins Capital de risque, led an undisclosed investment in Congebec Logistic Inc. The deal was also backed by Fondaction CSN and Investissement Québec and supported the transfer of management of Congebec Logistic from its founder, Laurier Pedneault, to his son, Nicholas-P Pedneault. As a result of the transaction, CRCD, an existing investor in the company, became the majority shareholder.

On April 25, 2017, Nick Pedneault was named Chairman of the WFLO (World Food Logistics Organisation) and said he would focus his efforts on the development and growth of the industry as well as on the promotion of the GCCA (Global Cold Chain Alliance). The WFLO represents the research and education component of the GCCA. Mr. Pedneault is the first ever Québec native to occupy this position.

In 2017 Congebec acquired Shamrock Cold Storage, inc. to establish its presence in the Toronto area; Congebec, inc. Shamrock is a cold storage company is the Toronto Market. The clients that dealt with Shamrock will remain in the Toronto storage facility.
