= American Waterways Operators =

Logo of the American Waterways Operators.

The American Waterways Operators, is the national trade association for the U.S. tugboat, towboat and barge industry.

For more than 60 years AWO has promoted the contribution of the domestic waterways transportation industry to the U.S. economy. AWO acts as the principal advocate for the U.S. tugboat, towboat and barge industry in Washington, D.C. with key policymakers and federal officials.

AWO maintains regional offices in Seattle, St. Louis, New Orleans, and Washington, D.C. These offices manage state legislative and regional regulatory issues and maintain an effective grassroots network for congressional advocacy.

Organized in Washington, D.C. in 1944, AWO now has over 300 member companies that serve the diverse needs of U.S. shippers and consumers. AWO members operate throughout the United States on America's rivers, canals, in its ports and harbors, on the Great Lakes, and on the Atlantic, Pacific and Gulf coasts.

AWO is governed by an elected body of 52 members who serve on the association's Board of Directors. The Board is responsible for development and approval of policy and strategy.

== See also ==
- Barge
- Car float
- List of industry trade groups in the United States
- Towboat
- Tugboat
