= International Safety Equipment Association =

- Company type: Not-for-profit
- Industry: Safety
- Founded: United States 1933
- Headquarters: 1101 Wilson Boulevard; Arlington, Virginia, United States
- Services: Safety equipment standards and advocacy
- Revenue: 1,891,569 United States dollar (2022)
- Total assets: 4,019,459 United States dollar (2022)
- Website: safetyequipment.org

The International Safety Equipment Association (ISEA) is a trade association of manufacturers of personal protective equipment and other safety equipment, with its offices in Arlington, Virginia. More than 100 companies are members. The ISEA is the secretariat organization for several American National Standards Institute technical standards for products such as high visibility clothing, eye protection, hard hats, chemical and dust protection, hand protection, and others; formerly this role was filled by the American Society of Safety Engineers.

The organization was founded in 1933 as the Industrial Safety Equipment Association. It adopted its current name in 2000. Since 2002 it has had a Web site accessible to the public and member organizations. In addition to technical standards development and market research, the organization also provides representation of the safety products industry to the American government.

== Political advocacy ==
=== Opposition to right-to-repair legislation ===
In July 2024, ISEA signed a letter to members of both the House Committee on Armed Services and the Senate Committee on Armed Services opposing Section 828 of S. 4628, the National Defense Authorization Act for Fiscal Year 2025, entitled "Requirement for Contractors to Provide Reasonable Access to Repair Materials," which would require contractors doing business with the US military to agree "to provide the Department of Defense fair and reasonable access to all the repair materials, including parts, tools, and information, used by the manufacturer or provider or their authorized partners to diagnose, maintain, or repair the good or service."
