= Steel service center =

A steel service center is a company that deals with the service related activities of the steel industry. In a typical scenario, a steel manufacturer produces steel in bulk and then sells it to the customer. The customer then uses this steel according to its respective business. Small and medium enterprise businesses (SME) often have a problem in buying good quality steel from a big manufacturer. This is for various reasons, such as, the minimum amount of steel which the manufacturer sells is more than the SME requires. Hence, this leads to maintaining a huge warehouse, adding to the total cost.

== Operation ==
A steel service center buys steel from a manufacturer, stores it, and sells it to end users as required. This saves the SME from the trouble of buying extra steel or even maintaining an inventory. The steel service center may also process the steel, e.g. by cutting to a size or shape specified by the customer, before sale. The quantity and the methods of processing of steel vary from center to center. It mostly depends on the product mix and the customer mix of the center.

== See also ==
Metals Service Center Institute, the organization into which the Steel Service Center Institute merged
