= ASSE-MEC =

American Society of Safety Engineers – Middle East Chapter belongs to the American Society of Safety Professionals that was founded in 1911 and is considered the world's oldest and largest professional safety organization. The organization has 33,000 members who manage, supervise and consult on safety, health and environmental issues in industry, insurance, government and education. ASSE has 12 divisions and 148 chapters in the United States and abroad.

ASSE-MEC was founded on September 15, 1982, in the city of Dhahran, Saudi Arabia. The chapter covers Arab countries of the Persian Gulf: Saudi Arabia, Kuwait, Bahrain, Qatar, United Arab Emirates and Oman. ASSE-MEC was the first sub-organization of ASSE established outside the United States. The current chapter membership is approximately 200 . ASSE-MEC has increasingly become active since headed by Eng. Tariq S Al Ghamdi.
