= Congress of Chiropractic State Associations =

US nonprofit organization

Logo of the Congress of Chiropractic State Associations.

Congress of Chiropractic State Associations (COCSA) is a nonprofit organization formed with the mission of promoting a more unified profession for chiropractors.

== Activities ==
The organization hosts an annual conference which serves as a platform for the leaders in each state's chiropractic association to meet and share ideas to better serve their members.

In April 2002, they organized National Backpack Safety Month.

== Class action ==
In 2011, the group sued UnitedHealth Group and OptumHealth. In November of that year, Foot Levelers gave them a grant for $25,000 for the COCSA's participation in their speakership program.

== See also ==
- American Chiropractic Association
