= Cordage Institute =

International trade association

- Tax ID no.: 13-0600560
- Headquarters: Wayne, Pennsylvania
- Website: www.ropecord.com

The Cordage Institute, founded in 1920, is an international trade association of fiber rope manufacturers, their suppliers, and affiliated end-user organizations. The purpose of the group is to create technical standards related the safe use of rope and cordage. It is a not-for-profit corporation that depends on manufacturers in the industry, as well as companies serving industry members, to support the association and actively participate through the payment of dues and the volunteering of time.

== Structure and Membership ==
As of January 2010, there are 80 members including rope manufacturers, synthetic fiber manufacturers, equipment suppliers and industry consultants, as well as groups representing military, academic and end-user organizations. The Cordage Institute is led by a board of directors which is elected from and by the membership. There are three official meetings per year, including two technical committee meetings and one annual conference with technical and business components.

== Standards ==
The group creates standards through a technical committee with specialized sub-committees. Standards are drafted within the sub-committees and accepted through a voluntary consensus process and board approval. Typical standards include performance characteristics for rope products, usage guidelines and testing procedures. These standards are available to the public for reference and may be used during specification, purchase, testing, or use of rope products.

== Other publications ==
Ropecord News is a quarterly publication of the Cordage Institute. It includes product, application and market information related to the rope industry.

== See also ==
- Rope
- Synthetic fiber
