= Global Cold Chain Alliance =

- Abbreviation: GCCA
- Formation: 1891; 135 years ago (Current form 2007)
- Merger of: International Association of Refrigerated Warehouses, International Refrigerated Transportation Association, World Food Logistics Organization
- Type: Nonprofit trade association
- Purpose: Share information and best practise on cold storage in supply chain
- Location: Arlington, Virginia, United States
- Region served: Worldwide
- Services: Organise events, share resources
- Fields: Cold storage supply chain
- President: Sara Stickler
- Website: www.gcca.org

The Global Cold Chain Alliance (GCCA) is an international trade association representing industries engaged in temperature-controlled warehousing, logistics and transportation. The alliance is headquartered in Arlington, Virginia in the United States.

In 2007 the Global Cold Chain Alliance was formed through the merger of the International Association of Refrigerated Warehouses (IARW) and International Refrigerated Transportation Association (IRTA), when leaders of both organisations realised that global supply chain depends on transportation and warehousing working closely together.

The World Food Logistics Organization (WFLO) would later join as a core partner of the alliance as well as the Controlled Environment Building Association (CEBA).

The GCCA serves as the central coordinating body for these associations, promoting best practices, advocacy, and industry development worldwide.

== History ==
The GCCA was formed in 2007 through the merger of two processor organizations and was joined by a number of other core partners that became part of the alliance.

The merger was between the International Association of Refrigerated Warehouses (IARW) formed in 1891, the International Refrigerated Transportation Association (IRTA) formed in 1994.

=== IARW ===
The International Association of Refrigerated Warehouses (IARW) was founded in 1891. It was created when a group of conventional (non-refrigerated) warehouse owners began sharing knowledge about storing perishable food. As perishable food storage is complex, this organization soon became known industry-wide for their expertise about temperature controlled storage facilities.

IARW's goals and activities broadened over the years. In addition to collecting information and encouraging the exchange of ideas, the association promoted efficiency in distribution, aids members in adopting new technology, advises legislators on behalf of the food industry, assists members in complying with U.S. and international regulations, and participates in alliances with international organizations to build an efficient world food logistics community. All active members of IARW are also members and beneficiaries of the work of The World Food Logistics Organization (WFLO).

=== IRTA ===
The International Refrigerated Transportation Association (IRTA) was established in 1994 to meet a growing demand in the transportation industry for chilled and frozen food products. IRTA was led by a core group of international companies, including companies which specialize in transportation categories across the cold chain. IRTA members were companies primarily involved in ports, trucking, warehousing, logistics, marine shipping, railroads, and airplane transportation, or any combination of these industries.

=== GCCA ===
The Global Cold Chain Alliance officially launched in April 2007. The Alliance now acts as the platform for communication, networking and education for each link of the cold chain. It serves as the voice of the cold chain industry.

The International Association of Refrigerated Warehouses (IARW) and the World Food Logistics Organization (WFLO) had a history of serving the food industry through the twentieth century and the impressive development of refrigeration in the movement of food products.

In the 21st century, many IARW and WFLO members realized changes in their business models were necessary as global conditions required greater integration of the cold chain. This reform of integration created closer relationships among all players in the supply chain, which lead to developments such as dedicated distribution facilities and public refrigerated warehouse (PRW) trucking assets. The WFLO became a core partner of the alliance.

== Members in North America ==
IARW's top 10 North American based members as of 2022
| | Company | Capacity ft^{3} | Capacity m^{3} |
|---|---|---|---|
| 1 | Lineage Logistics | 1,830,359,454 | 51,829,959 |
| 2 | Americold Logistics | 1,161,403,908 | 32,887,265 |
| 3 | United States Cold Storage, Inc. | 423,328,669 | 11,987,322 |
| 4 | Interstate Warehousing, Inc. | 115,735,371 | 3,277,258 |
| 5 | VersaCold Logistics Services | 105,530,974 | 2,988,302 |
| 6 | Conestoga Cold Storage | 64,313,826 | 1,821,163 |
| 7 | Congebec Logistics, Inc. | 60,866,880 | 1,723,556 |
| 8 | RLS Logistics | 59,028,604 | 1,671,502 |
| 9 | Burris Logistics | 58,887,444 | 1,667,505 |
| 10 | NewCold Holdings, LLC | 47,972,150 | 1,358,419 |
