= Brand USA =

Brand USA, officially the Corporation for Travel Promotion, is a destination marketing organization and public private partnership established in 2010 to raise awareness of the United States as a tourist destination. As of 2025, the initiative is authorized and funded through 2027.

What is now Brand USA was authorized in 2010 by Congress through the Travel Promotion Act. It was launched at World Travel Market and began operations in 2011 after the country received less than what was perceived as its fair share of international tourism. The program was initially authorized for five years and while it has generally operated with the support of both Republicans and Democrats, in 2017, the organization was threatened by the Trump administration's initial plans for fiscal 2018, but continued to exist.

While much of Brand USA's funding comes from fees tied to international visa payments to which it has to provide matching funding, in 2022, the Biden administration signed Restoring Brand USA Act which authorized $250million to continue the country's recovery from the downturn caused by the COVID-19 pandemic.

Brand USA's initiatives include Brand USA Travel Week, which launched in 2019.

Chris Thompson was President & CEO from 2012 until his retirement in May 2024, followed by Fred Dixon from 2024 to 2026. The current Interim President & CEO is Caroline Beteta.
