= Plumbing Manufacturers International =

- Tax ID no.: 25-6034257
- Headquarters: McLean, Virginia
- CEO/Executive Director: Kerry Stackpole
- Revenue: $2,378,552 USD (2023)
- Website: www.safeplumbing.org

Plumbing Manufacturers International (PMI) is an industry association for manufacturers of plumbing products. Its members make 90% of the plumbing products sold in North America. Its headquarters is in McLean, Virginia.

== History ==
In existence since the 1960s when it was known as the Plumbing Brass Institute (PBI), the organization’s scope was expanded in 1975 and the name changed to the Plumbing Manufacturers Institute (PMI). In 1998, it was reorganized around focus issues, product groups and standing committees and moved from a management company to a stand-alone organization with a dedicated staff. In 2010, it changed its name to Plumbing Manufacturers International to reflect its expanded scope.

== Purpose ==
The association aims to advocate for its members, with representatives in Washington, D.C. and US states to monitor legislation at the federal, state and local levels to ensure public health and safety, water efficiency and product performance. It also aims to act as a source of industry and market information, and as a coordinating and decision-making body for dealing with industry issues, including the development and maintenance of codes and standards.

To provide advocacy for its members and the industry in regulatory and legislative matters, PMI staff are represented on National Association of Home Builders' Leading Suppliers Council and the United States Environmental Protection Agency (EPA) group Water Sense Partners, which aim to develop and maintain codes and standards. In addition to domestic alliances, PMI has formal agreements with the Bathroom Manufacturers Association in the UK, the Canadian Institute of Plumbing and Heating and the Plumbing Products Industry Group in Australia.

PMI hosts conferences and training workshops throughout the year.

== Advocacy ==
Opposition to military right-to-repair legislation

In July 2024, PMI signed a letter to members of both the House Committee on Armed Services and the Senate Committee on Armed Services opposing Section 828 of S. 4628, the National Defense Authorization Act for Fiscal Year 2025, entitled "Requirement for Contractors to Provide Reasonable Access to Repair Materials," which would require contractors doing business with the US military to agree "to provide the Department of Defense fair and reasonable access to all the repair materials, including parts, tools, and information, used by the manufacturer or provider or their authorized partners to diagnose, maintain, or repair the good or service." PMI's opposition to the "Right to Repair" provisions contained in the NDAA FY25 are based on the absence of any provisions to assure safeguarding of intellectual property, or addressing potential liability risks.

== Membership ==
Membership in PMI is open to global manufacturers of plumbing industry products including potable water supply system components, fixture fittings, waste fixture fittings, fixtures, flushing devices, sanitary drainage system components, and plumbing appliances, which are marketed and sold within the territorial limits of United States and Canada. In 2012, PMI opened its membership to plumbing materials and components suppliers and certifier organizations through its Allied Membership program.

== SafePlumbing.org ==
PMI is the owner of an educational website which serves as a clearinghouse for information about plumbing fixtures and fittings, as well as information about clean water, water efficiency and bathroom safety. The site provides a glossary of plumbing industry terms and a directory of North American plumbing product markings.
