= Maintenance testing =

Identify equipment problems through routine testing

Maintenance testing is a test that is performed to either identify equipment problems, diagnose equipment problems, or confirm that repair measures have been effective. It can be performed at either the system level (e.g., the HVAC system), the equipment level (e.g., the blower in an HVAC line), or the component level (e.g., a control chip in the control box for the blower in the HVAC line).

== Technical basis for testing ==
Maintenance testing uses system performance requirements to identify the appropriate components for further inspection or repair. A good testing program will record test results and maintenance actions taken. These data will be evaluated for trends and serve as the basis for decisions on appropriate testing frequency, the need to replace or upgrade equipment, and performance improvement opportunities.

== In-service inspection and testing ==
One level of maintenance testing is the in-service inspection or inspection, which typically is a test or series of tests performed on a frequency established by the manufacturer based on prior experience with the system/equipment/component or upon engineering analysis of the probable failure rate for the equipment.

Typical examples of inspections and tests include:

- Periodic vehicle inspections mandated by regulatory authorities for features important to environmental protection (e.g., exhaust emissions) or for safety (e.g., brake and signal lights).
- Periodic inspections of nuclear power plant equipment important to the safe operation of the facility. Such inspections include a range of tests such as
  - Leak-rate tests for containment structures (the reactor boundary, the containment vessel, etc.).
  - Calibration tests to assure shutdown systems will activate on over-power or over-temperature conditions.
- The medical physical examination or clinical examination can be considered diagnostic testing of in-service inspection for the human body
- Performance tests such as turbine shaft vibration tests to identify wear and plan maintenance are a form of diagnostic testing.

== Evaluation and trending of test results ==
A good testing program will record test results and maintenance actions taken. These data will be evaluated for trends and serve as the basis for decisions on appropriate testing frequency, the need to replace or upgrade equipment, and performance improvement opportunities.

== Types of maintenance for which testing can be used ==
Maintenance falls into the following four categories:

- Preventive maintenance — Changes to the existing system so as to reduce the risk of failure while operating.
- Corrective maintenance — Correcting problems while using the system.
- Perfective maintenance — Enhancements (modifications) to improve the safety, reliability, efficiency, or cost-effectiveness of operation.
- Adaptive maintenance — Adaptations to address requirements that crop up due to changes in the environment or new regulations.
- Performance; Performance

== See also ==
- auto mechanic
- Preventive maintenance
- reliability engineering
- Product Lifecycle Management
