= International Association of Travel Agents Network =

Organization

International Airlines Travel Agent Network
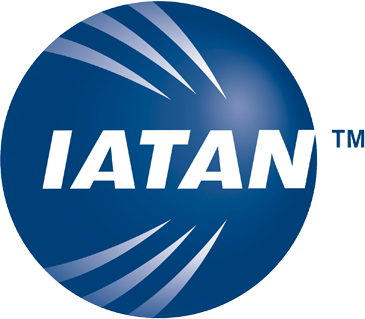
- Logo of the International Airlines Travel Agent Network
- Parent organization: International Air Transport Association
- Website: www.iatan.org

The International Airlines Travel Agent Network (IATAN) is a Miami-based trade association in the United States representing the interests of its member companies (airlines) and the U.S. travel distribution network (travel agencies). It is an independent department of the International Air Transport Association (IATA).

In addition, it (along with the IATA) is the body responsible for the standard international codes for airlines, airports, hotels, cities and car rental firms. These codes provide a method to link international travel network with international suppliers.

== See also ==
- American Society of Travel Agents
- IATA airport code
