= Railway Tie Association =

The Railway Tie Association (RTA) is a trade association in the railroad and rail transit industry. The purpose of the RTA is to promote the economical and environmentally sound use of wood crossties. The RTA is involved in research into crosstie design and ongoing activities dealing with sound forest management, conservation of timber resources, timber processing, wood preservation, environmentally sound used tie disposal, and safety of industry workers. The Association's mission statement is: "Our mission since 1919 has been to ensure that the engineered wood crosstie system continues to evolve and improve in order to remain cost-effective and to meet the ever-changing requirements of track systems around the world."

== History ==
=== Early railroads ===
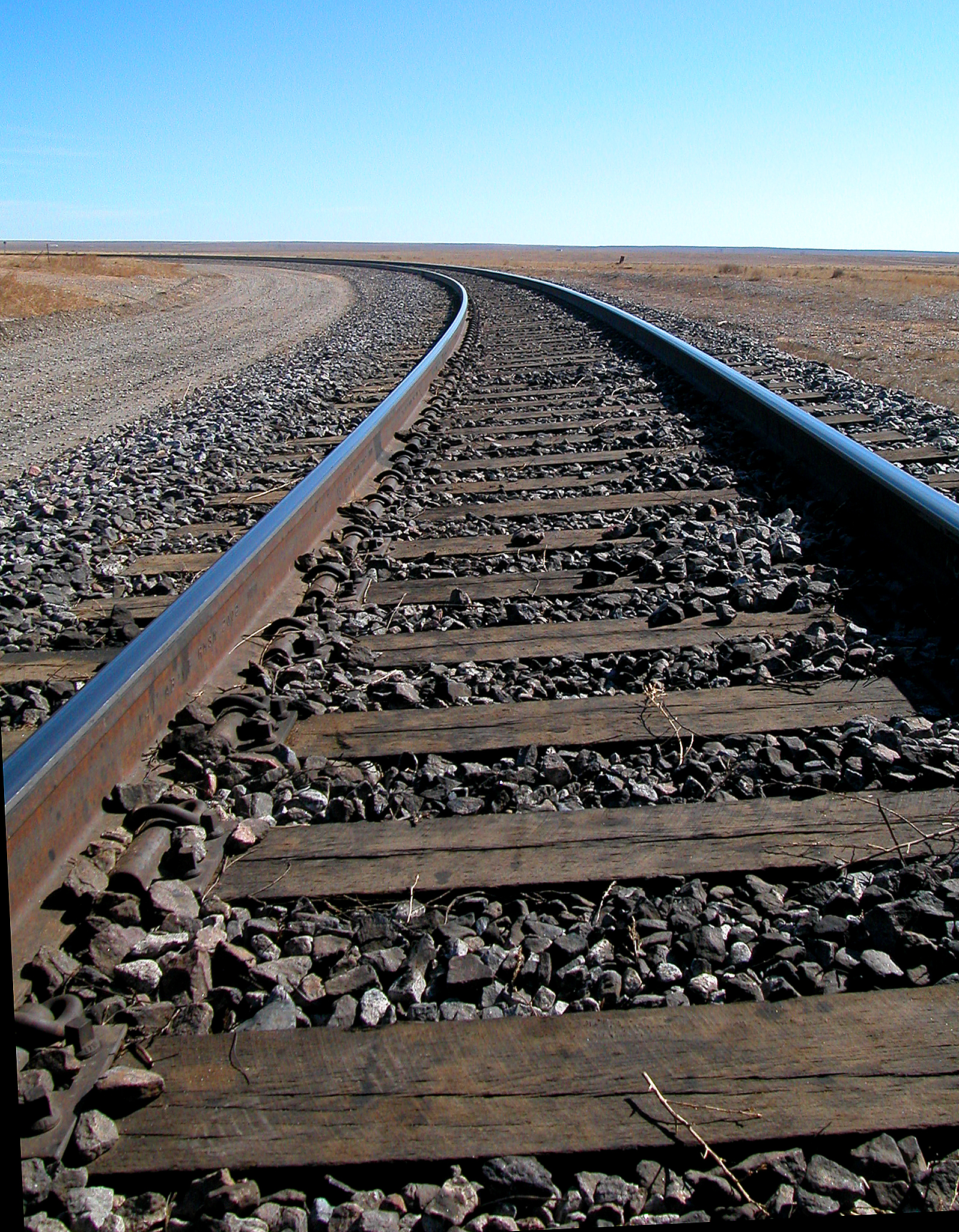
Treated railroad ties in track in Colorado, USA.

The first railroads in the United States were constructed in the early 1830s. These railroads mounted track made of strips of iron secured to wood stringers onto stone blocks. The first recorded use of wood railroad ties is in 1832 when Robert Stevens, president of the Camden and Amboy Railroad in New Jersey substituted wood ties for stone due to slow deliveries of stone ties from Sing Sing prison in New York. Hewn wood crossties caught on quickly and were cut from trees along the railroad right-of-way. Tie hackers used a crosssaw and a broadaxe to hand hew railroad ties until they were phased out by sawmills by the early 1940s. The advent of steam power and then gasoline engines allowed sawmills to operate efficiently and on site as needed making tie hacking obsolete over time.

=== Pressure treatment ===
The crosstie industry began to employ pressure treating as a means of prolonging tie life beginning in the mid-1800s. The first crossties were treated in 1838 with an infusion of bichloride of mercury and laid on the Northern Central railroad in Maryland. The first permanent treating facility began operations in 1848 in Lowell, Massachusetts using alternately bichloride of mercury and chloride of zinc. Tie treatments continue to evolve today with new research and methods. Railroad and aviation engineer Octave Chanute, who was instrumental in the use of preservatives for ties, is credited with the introduction of the date nail to keep track of the life of treated railroad ties in track.

=== The Tie Industry ===
Railroad development kept pace with the expanding frontier in the United States after the American Civil War, creating a burgeoning need for new railroad ties. Every mile of track required about 2,500-3,500 crossties. Trains became heavier and faster and the railroads found it was less expensive to add more ties per mile than to buy heavier rail. During World War I, President Woodrow Wilson created the United States Railroad Administration to support the financially weak railroad industry. The USRA took control of pricing and standardization of crosstie sizes. Following World War I, tie demand contracted as railroads consolidated lines, used more preserved wood ties, and the Great Depression caused railroads to become bankrupt. During the Great Depression, the Federal Government of the United States again stepped in to control the price of forest products, including wood ties. During World War II, tie demand rose again as the war effort created a need for more track and thus more ties. Tie demand has seen its share of ebb and flow, but remains fairly constant as ties come to the end of their useful life in track and are retired to other uses.

=== Foundation of the Association ===
The RTA was founded in St. Louis, Missouri in 1919 as the National Association of Railroad Tie Producers. The first annual meeting for the association was held at the Hotel Statler in St. Louis on January 30 and 31, 1919. John W. Fristoe was the first president. In his inaugural speech he stated, "I hope that you gentlemen will succeed in forming your organization; that when it is formed, the first effort you make will be to develop economies; not how to get more for your stock, but how to produce it for less. How to pay your labor well, how they may derive a part of it...We have got to get down to the simplest form of business in which the producer comes closest to the consumer, and in that way wipe out unnecessary expenses." The Association still values these same ideals. The name was changed on July 26, 1932 to The Railway Tie Association.

== Committees ==
At the beginning of 2013 the RTA had the following active committees:

- Committee for Legislative & Environmental Affairs Response (CLEAR)
- Education Committee
- Executive Committee
- Manufacturing Safety & Material Handling
- Research and Development
- Tie Disposal Task Force (Subcommittee to R&D)

== Activities ==
In 2012, the RTA added a members only section to its website where members can interact with each other during the year. Members use this area to discuss market trends, manufacturing and safety, Legislative action, news, education, environmental and recycling concerns, product questions, and offer things for sale or trade.

=== Meetings ===
In or around October, the RTA holds a Symposium and Technical Conference. Around 300 people attend the annual Conference.

In the spring The RTA conducts a Field Trip to various industry-specific sites to help members better understand different aspects of the wood crosstie industry.

In the summer The RTA holds a Tie Grading Seminar dedicated to member education about wood crosstie specifications.

In March, the RTA participates in the annual Railroad Day on Capitol Hill event with the American Short Line and Regional Railroad Association, the Association of American Railroads, and the National Railroad Construction and Maintenance Association.

=== Scholarships ===
The RTA offers two scholarships to college students enrolled in Forestry programs accredited by The Society of American Foresters. The submission deadline is 30 June each year.

=== Industry recommended practices and publications ===
The RTA publishes industry specifications and news on its website and in hard copies available to the public and in various railroad industry publications.

The RTA publishes the bi-monthly magazine titled Crossties which covers all aspects of the wood crosstie industry The Tie Guide in English and Spanish which offers specification and treatment information, and The Tie Specifications booklet for quick reference.

=== Ongoing research ===
The RTA partners with organizations such as the Association of American Railroads' subsidiary Transportation Technology Center, Inc. (TTCI), University of Delaware, University of Illinois at Urbana-Champaign, Mississippi State University, American Wood Protection Association, and others to conduct ongoing research into processes intended to extend the life of wood railroad ties.
