= International Electrical Testing Association =

- Formerly: National Electrical Testing Association
- Industry: Electrical Testing
- Founded: 1972
- Headquarters: Portage, Michigan, USA
- Key people: executive director Bryant Phillips
- Website: www.netaworld.org

The International Electrical Testing Association (NETA), formerly the National Electrical Testing Association, is a trade association dedicated to improving electrical testing standards in the United States and sharing those standards internationally. NETA is accredited by the American National Standards Institute (ANSI) as a standards developing entity. It is guided by an active Board of Directors consisting of professionals within the electrical testing industry. The Board meets quarterly for official meetings. Board members also participate on various NETA committees, such as the Standards Review Council, Certification Exam, Membership, Finance, Association Development and Strategy, Promotions and Marketing, Nominations and Mission Based Programs.

NETA's stated mission is "...to serve the electrical testing industry by establishing standards; publishing specifications; accrediting independent, third-party testing companies; certifying test technicians; and promoting the professional services of its members. The Association also collects and disseminates information and data of value to the electrical industry and educates the public and end user about the merits of electrical acceptance and maintenance testing."

== History ==
In the 1960s, the electrical industry was booming thanks to lower prices and the huge increase in the number and reach of power lines, making electricity more in demand than ever before. By 1972, it was widely recognized that this rapid growth demanded some oversight to promote safety, system reliability, and quality testing. Nine companies came together and channeled this need into the creation of NETA, the National Electrical Testing Association. That same year, NETA released its first standard, Acceptance Testing Specifications for Electrical Power Equipment and Systems. NETA then turned its attention to improving the work of electrical technicians. To that end, the NETA Electrical Testing Technician Certification program was established in 1975. In recognition that the association had reached beyond United States borders, the name was changed to the InterNational Electrical Testing Association in 1983. In its ever-increasing desire to keep ahead of the changing industry, the NETA Accredited Company (NAC) program was instituted in 1991. Shortly thereafter, a program was developed for individual professionals in the electrical power industry to join NETA as alliance partners. NETA became ANSI Accredited in 1996, and by 2000 had released the first ANSI Accredited Standard, the ANSI/NETA Standard for Certification of Electrical Testing Technicians. A version of the ANSI/NETA Standard for Maintenance Testing Specifications was first published in 1975, with the most recent edition released in 2015. In 2013, the latest version of NETA's very first publication, the ANSI/NETA Standard for Acceptance Testing Specifications for Electrical Power Equipment and Systems, was verified as an American National Standard. The association actively furthers their mission to serve the electrical industry by continuing to develop standards, most recently in 2015 with the publication of the ANSI/NETA Standard for Electrical Commissioning Specifications. NETA celebrated 45 years of continual improvement of the electrical testing industry in 2017. The organization is managed by a private company which is not responsible to the public or NETA Members.

== Establishing Standards ==
The Standards Review Council (SRC) is a committee within NETA that is nominated by the NETA President and is appointed by the Technical Chair. The SRC is responsible for approving revisions to NETA's technical publications on a stated timetable. The revisions are based on technical input from all committees and the NETA office. Input is also taken from members of ballot pools, individuals who go through an application process to participate in the standards development process. Comments on the candidate standard from the general public can be submitted during the public review periods, which are announced in the ANSI Standards Action. The standards are for use by anyone responsible for the safe and reliable operation of electrical power equipment and systems. NETA currently has four ANSI Accredited Standards; ANSI/NETA Standard for Certification of Electrical Testing Technicians, ANSI/NETA Standard for Acceptance Testing Specifications for Electrical Power Equipment and Systems, ANSI/NETA Standard for Maintenance Testing Specifications for Electrical Power Equipment and Systems, and ANSI/NETA Standard for Electrical Commissioning Specifications for Electrical Power Equipment and Systems.

== Publishing ==
As the publisher of American National Standards for the electrical testing industry, NETA is responsible for ensuring that these standards are periodically reviewed and kept up to date. These updated standards, along with other handbooks and training materials, are made available through NETA. NETA also publishes a quarterly technical magazine, the NETA World Journal. This periodical contains articles on technical updates, industry trends, case studies and training information.

== Accreditation ==
The heart of the association is the NETA Accredited Companies (NAC). To qualify as an NAC, companies must first be third-party, independent firms that have no bias with potential clients or affiliation with a particular brand of equipment. The accreditation process is composed of two parts: accrediting the company and separately certifying the individual technicians that are employed by the company. Once all the requirements have been met and the company receives approval from the Board of Directors, they can begin taking full advantage of their member status, which includes identifying themselves in the marketplace as a NETA Accredited Company and associated use of the NETA logo. All NACs are periodically reviewed to ensure their continued status as a member in good standing.

== Certification ==
NETA certifies three levels of electrical testing technicians: Certified Assistant Technician, Certified Technician, and Certified Senior Technician. Each level has progressively increasing requirements for number of years of training and related experience. An intensive written exam must be passed at each level. Technicians must pass each level sequentially to progress to elevated certification levels. To maintain their certification, technicians must complete Continuing Technical Development (CTD) credits periodically. This ensures that they stay up to date on industry safety and procedure standards. Certification through NETA is only available to individuals connected to an organization that is recognized/accredited by NETA.

== Alliance Program ==
The Alliance Program at NETA is a network of professionals and companies who have vested interests in furthering the safety and reliability of electrical power equipment. These groups are not NETA accredited, but partner with NETA and NETA Accredited Companies to bring input from their perspectives throughout all sectors of the electrical power industry.

== Training ==
To fully incorporate NETA's mission to propagate information on electrical testing, NETA offers various training courses covering many facets of the electrical testing industry. Online courses cover specific areas of acceptance testing and include interactive portions. Self-Paced Technical Seminars (SPTS) are a series of recorded seminars encompassing electrical power system commissioning, acceptance, and maintenance testing. The Electrical Safety Training System (ESTS) is a series of multi-media, interactive classes that are focused on teaching safety procedures in hazardous workplace environments. Enrollment in classes is open to anyone and can be submitted for Continuing Education units. NETA Certified Technicians can earn their Continuing Technical Development credits with these classes.

== PowerTest Conference ==
NETA organizes and hosts PowerTest, an annual conference focused on electrical power systems commissioning, acceptance, maintenance, and safety. It consists of five days of presentations, panel discussions, half-day seminars, a trade show, new product innovations, and networking opportunities. The conference is typically attended by engineers, manufacturers, operators, technicians, contractors, managers, inspectors, and technicians - anyone who is interested in expanding their knowledge of the industry.
