= Federation of Internet Solution Providers of the Americas =

The Federation of Internet Solution Providers of the Americas (FISPA) is an association of Internet service providers.

FISPA was established in 1996 under the name Florida Internet Solution Providers Association. After expanding beyond the bounds of Florida, the organization was renamed the Federation of Internet Solution Providers of the Americas. FISPA is made up of members dedicated to facilitating smoother online and networked operations. It is based in Matthews, North Carolina, U.S.A.
