= Energy and Minerals Business Council =

The Energy and Minerals Business Council is a global business forum of mining and energy corporations formed in 2006 with an inaugural meeting at the Grand Hyatt Melbourne Hotel, in Melbourne, Australia on 18 November and 19 November 2006. The meeting was held to coincide with the 2006 G20 summit.

Membership is composed of the world's most powerful mining and oil companies including BHP, Rio Tinto, Companhia Vale do Rio Doce, Woodside Petroleum, Saudi Aramco, Anglo American, PetroCanada and the BG Group.

== Inaugural Meeting ==
Fifteen chief executives from the mining and energy sector attended the inaugural meeting, with Chip Goodyear, CEO of BHP Billiton chairing the meeting.

In a first for a G20 meeting, an elite group of business leaders from the Energy and Minerals Business Council "was able to address G20 Finance Ministers and Reserve Bank Governors at dinner on Saturday evening and at a working lunch".

In a statement released on 18 November 2006 the Energy and Minerals Business Council said:

"The aim for the natural resources industry is to provide sufficient resources at a reasonable price and in a sustainable way to ensure social and economic development."

Resource industry leaders said there had been a lack of investment in capacity in the industry, with a decline in levels of both skills and research and development, and that growth in Asian demand had not been anticipated. "The industry has been responding to these changes and is making massive investments, but the lead times are typically up to 10 years," according to the statement reported in The Australian. The statement also argued for policy reforms to build extraction capacity, encourage market solutions, and promote accountability.

Rodrigo de Rato, Managing Director of the International Monetary Fund addressed the meeting of the Energy and Minerals Business Council. as well as Australian Teasurer Peter Costello.

== See also ==
- International Council on Mining and Metals
