= International Wrestling Association =

International Wrestling Association may refer to:

- International Wrestling Association (Puerto Rico) (IWA), one of several major promotions based in Puerto Rico which was established by promoter Victor Quiñones in 1994.
- International Wrestling Association of Japan (IWA Japan), a Japanese-based promotion, founded by Victor Quiñones in 1994 as an offshoot of IWA Puerto Rico and successor of WI*NG.
- International Wrestling Association (1970s), a short-lived Cleveland-based promotion established by promoters Pedro Martinez and Eddie Einhorn in one of the earliest attempts to establish a national wrestling promotion during 1975.
- International Wrestling Association (Chicago), a defunct Chicago-based regional promotion established by promoter Fred Kohler during the early 1960s.
- International Wrestling Association (Montreal), a Montreal-based regional promotion established by promoter Jean Rougeau during the 1960s and 1970s. The promotion would eventually be succeeded by Promotions Varoussac (International Wrestling) during the early 1970s.
