= Associated Equipment Distributors =

International trade association

- Formation: 1919
- Founder: Morton R. Hunter
- Founded at: Milwaukee, Wisconsin
- Type: International trade association
- Headquarters: Schaumburg, Illinois
- Services: Lobbying, education, research, networking and public relations
- Chairman: Diane Benck
- Website: www.aednet.org

Associated Equipment Distributors (AED) is an international trade association representing over 800 industrial equipment companies that rent and sell equipment used in construction, mining, energy, agriculture and other industrial applications. The association runs congressional lobbying, education, research, networking and public relations programs. AED was founded in 1919 and is headquartered in Schaumburg, Illinois. The chairman of the association is Diane Benck of Naperville, Illinois.

== History ==
In 1913, Milwaukee, Wisconsin native Morton R. Hunter, stepson to President Herbert Hoover's secretary, graduated from the University of Michigan with a civil engineering degree. After college, he joined the Kern-Hunter Company, a machine distributor, as a salesman. Within a year, he bought the company and renamed it to Hunter Machinery Co.

Hunter and his company invented the first bulldozer used to plow snow off roads. He also invented the first truck-mounted cement mixer.

In 1919, he created the Associated Equipment Distributors as a trade association for companies like his own.

In 1954, Hunter returned to AED as a member of the advisory board.

In 1966, independent distributors of construction equipment sold $1.1 billion in new equipment and $270 million in used equipment in the United States. That year, America had a fleet of 23,000 service repairmen. 900 distributors and 400 manufacturers operated in the U.S. and Canada in 1966.

In 1969, only one founder of AED was still living: Morton R. Hunter of Milwaukee, Wisconsin.

The AED Foundation (AEDF) was formed in 1991 to offer "professional education and workforce development." AEDF accredits equipment technology educational programs at colleges in the United States.

In 2000, AED and TradeYard, Inc., an online trading network, announced the creation of a national inspection program for used construction equipment sold over the Internet. In that year, total e-commerce sales in the U.S. were $26 billion (compared with $298 billion in 2014).

In 2004, Dale Vaughn, head of OCT Equipment in Oklahoma City, was elected president of AED.

== Issues ==
=== Transportation and infrastructure ===
On September 8, 2014, AED president Brian McGuire published a letter to the editor in USA Today in response to the newspaper's then-recent editorial "Calif. drought bares national lessons". In his letter, McGuire compared the crisis of a drought to the broader crisis of funding national infrastructure projects. Specifically, McGuire urged the protection of what is called "state revolving funds," which amounted to $2.35 billion for sewage and drinking water projects. McGuire wrote, "You rightly observed that 'unlike an earthquake or a tornado, a drought is a slowly unfolding disaster.' I find that imagery very powerful because the broader crisis faced by our nation's infrastructure has been just that."

At the beginning of August 2015, Congress and President Obama passed a short term extension for federal highway funding. The association spoke out strongly against the inability of Congress to pass a long-term solution. McGuire was quoted in the publication Bulk Transporter saying, "Obviously we're pleased to finally see some progress on a long-term highway and transit bill. . . . At the same time, the lack of urgency in the House is inexcusable. For months we've heard promises and platitudes but seen no action. Rather than rolling up their sleeves and getting to work either writing their own bill or taking up the Senate's legislation, House lawmakers instead decided to leave for the August recess."

=== Skills gap ===
Obstacles to recruit and retain technically skilled workers cost the heavy equipment distribution industry in the United States around $2.4 billion per year. This figure represents around nine percent of earnings that companies in the industry forego due to the problem. These figures were determined through a scientific study commissioned by AED and conducted by public policy masters' students at the William & Mary Public Policy program under Dr. John Parman. Companies both in and outside of the industry struggle with finding the right workers with the right skills, known as the "skills gap." The study's authors used surveys as the primary study method. Surveys were mailed to 430 equipment dealerships in the U.S. and Canada. The final data came from a 24 percent response rate.

=== Opposition to right-to-repair legislation ===
In July 2024, AED signed a letter to members of both the House Committee on Armed Services and the Senate Committee on Armed Services opposing Section 828 of S. 4628, the National Defense Authorization Act for Fiscal Year 2025, entitled "Requirement for Contractors to Provide Reasonable Access to Repair Materials," which would require contractors doing business with the US military to agree "to provide the Department of Defense fair and reasonable access to all the repair materials, including parts, tools, and information, used by the manufacturer or provider or their authorized partners to diagnose, maintain, or repair the good or service."

=== Opposition to annual adjustment of overtime pay threshold ===
In 2016, AED closely watched and submitted input during the rule making process for the new 2016 federal rules on overtime.

The U.S. Department of Labor changed overtime pay rules on May 18, 2016. The process began in 2014 when President Obama signed a Presidential Memorandum that directed the Department of Labor to update regulations that affect white-collar workers who fall under minimum wage and overtime protections.

Prior to May 18, 2016, if someone earned a salary less than $23,660 and had job where they did certain type of administrative, managerial or professional work, they were not entitled to overtime pay. Now, under the new rules, if someone works over 40 hours per week, does the same certain type of administrative, managerial or professional work and earns a salary less than $47,476, he or she is now entitled to overtime pay under the new federal rules. The final overtime rule goes into effect on December 1, 2016.

When the Department of Labor first published its draft rule, it didn't specify $47,476. Instead, the draft rule would have determined that figure by using a national average of salaries, and it would have been updated annually. AED and employers spoke out against that provision in the rule by contacting the Department of Labor during the rule making process. As a result, that provision was changed to a fixed number. Employers were generally opposed because conducting financial forecasting would have been more difficult for companies.

Employment experts have argued whether the new rules will have a significant impact on employees' ability to work from home or work a couple extra hours one week in exchange for a couple extra hours less the following week, for example. Some experts predict a significant effect on workers, while others say the predictions are exaggerated. There are other issues too. For example, to avoid paying overtime, companies could increase the salaries of supervisors and managers whose salaries are near the $47,476 limit.

== Lobbying and political activity ==
On the professional lobbying front, AED hired the former assistant director at the IRS to lobby Congress on tax issues on its behalf. For grassroots lobbying, AED runs an annual legislative week for its members. Members of AED contact Congress to discuss issues related to the equipment industry. On the campaign and elections side, AED runs a political action machine (PAC) that gives campaign donations to federal candidates. AED outsources some of its lobbying activity. For example, in 2013, AED hired attorney Donald A. Barnes to lobby on behalf of AED on tax issues. Before lobbying, Barnes previously served as the Assistant to the Commissioner of Internal Revenue at the IRS.

Each year, AED hosts a week-long program designed to influence public policy. AED members contact Members of Congress to discuss issues relevant to the equipment manufacturing industry. The program is called the "AED Legislative Action Week."

AED owns a political action committee (PAC) that gives money to predominantly Republican political candidates. In the last two election cycles, AED gave the following amounts of political contributions to federal candidates:

Total Contributions	Party	Office	Election Cycle
$16,117	Democratic	U.S. House	2014
$84,651	Republican	U.S. House	2014
$8,000	Democratic	U.S. Senate	2014
$20,500	Republican	U.S. Senate	2014
$11,500	Democratic	U.S. House	2012
$74,500	Republican	U.S. House	2012
$0	Democratic	U.S. Senate	2012
$20,078	Republican	U.S. Senate	2012
$0	Democratic	Presidential	2012
$5,000	Republican	Presidential	2012

== Congressional testimony ==
AED influences the lawmaking process in Washington in the areas of Small Business Administration (SBA) loans, transportation spending, and energy issues.

On June 10, 2009, Tim Watters, a New Jersey–based equipment dealer, testified before Congress on behalf of AED. Before the U.S. House Small Business Committee, Watters asked Congress to increase funding for infrastructure projects, change the underwriting process for Small Business Association loans to help the construction industry get loans faster and easier, and investigate "allegations of SBA bias." On March 14, 2013, Whit Perryman, an executive with AED and owner of a Texas-based equipment company, testified before the U.S. House Natural Resources Subcommittee on Energy and Mineral Resources Hearing. In his testimony, Perryman admitted that his own company, Vermeer Texas-Louisiana, was benefiting from shale oil production. He testified that his company was going to add a new location in Midland Texas, the former home of both former presidents Bush and the one-time epicenter of West Texas oil fields.

On June 1, 2015, AED's chairman Don Shilling testified in a congressional hearing before House Small Business Committee. The hearing focused on the role that small companies played in the larger industries responsible for building roads, bridges, and other highway projects (referred to as the "surface transportation construction industry").

== Selected past presidents ==
- 1969 – James W. Griffith
- 1973 – Gordan W. Rowand
