= Tech Council of Maryland =

American trade association

The Tech Council of Maryland (TCM) is a technology trade association for companies with operations in Maryland, Washington, D.C., and Virginia. TCM has two divisions: The Tech Alliance, which serves the advanced technology industry, and MdBio, which serves the Maryland biotech industry.

== Member organizations ==
Organization name	Location	Industry
American Red Cross	Rockville, MD	Biotechnology and Bioscience
AmeriVault Corporation	Columbia, MD	Information Technology
Amgen	Owings Mills, MD	Biotechnology and Bioscience
APPTIS	Largo, MD	Information Technology
Aquilent Inc.	Laurel, MD	Information Technology
AT&T	Columbia, MD	Information Technology
BroadPoint Technologies	Bethesda, MD	Information Technology
Cisco Systems	Columbia, MD	Information Technology
CNSI	Rockville, MD	Information Technology
Comcast	Silver Spring, MD	Information Technology
Computech, Inc.	Bethesda, MD	Information Technology
Deltek, Inc.	Herndon, VA	Information Technology
GlaxoSmithKline	Alexandria, VA	Biotechnology and Bioscience
Hewlett Packard	Bethesda, MD	Information Technology
Howard Hughes Medical Institute	Chevy Chase, MD	Biotechnology and Bioscience
Hughes Network Systems	Germantown, Maryland	Information Technology
IBM Corporation	Bethesda, MD	Information Technology
InfoPathways, Inc.	Westminster, MD	Information Technology
Level 3 Communications	Baltimore, MD	Information Technology
Lockheed Martin Corporation	Baltimore, MD	Information Technology
MedImmune Inc.	Gaithersburg, Maryland	Biotechnology and Bioscience
Microsoft Corporation	Washington, DC	Information Technology
National Security Agency	Fort George G. Meade, MD	Federal Labs
Network Solutions	Herdon, VA	Information Technology
Northrop Grumman	McLean, VA	Information Technology
Paradigm Solutions	Rockville, MD	Information Technology
Paragen, Inc.	Washington, DC	Biotechnology and Bioscience
Paragon BioServices, Inc.	Baltimore, MD	Biotechnology and Bioscience
Pfizer	Reston, VA	Biotechnology and Bioscience
U.S. Army Medical Research and Materiel Command	Fort Detrick, MD	Biotechnology and Bioscience
USDA, ARS, Beltsville Agricultural Research Center	Beltsville, MD	Federal Labs
Verizon	Alexandria, VA	Information Technology
York Laboratories, LLC	York, PA	Biotechnology and Bioscience
Zai Team - Management Consultants	Columbia, MD	Management Consultants
Zalgen Labs	Germantown, MD	Biotechnology and Bioscience
