= Mineral Information Institute =

The Mineral Information Institute (MII) is an American educational institute dedicated to teaching schoolchildren about minerals and mining from the perspective of the mining industry. It sometimes influences the choice of textbooks, and it states that its web site and other resources are linked to or referenced by several textbook publishers.
