= Audio Visual and Integrated Experience Association =

Audiovisual Standards Organization

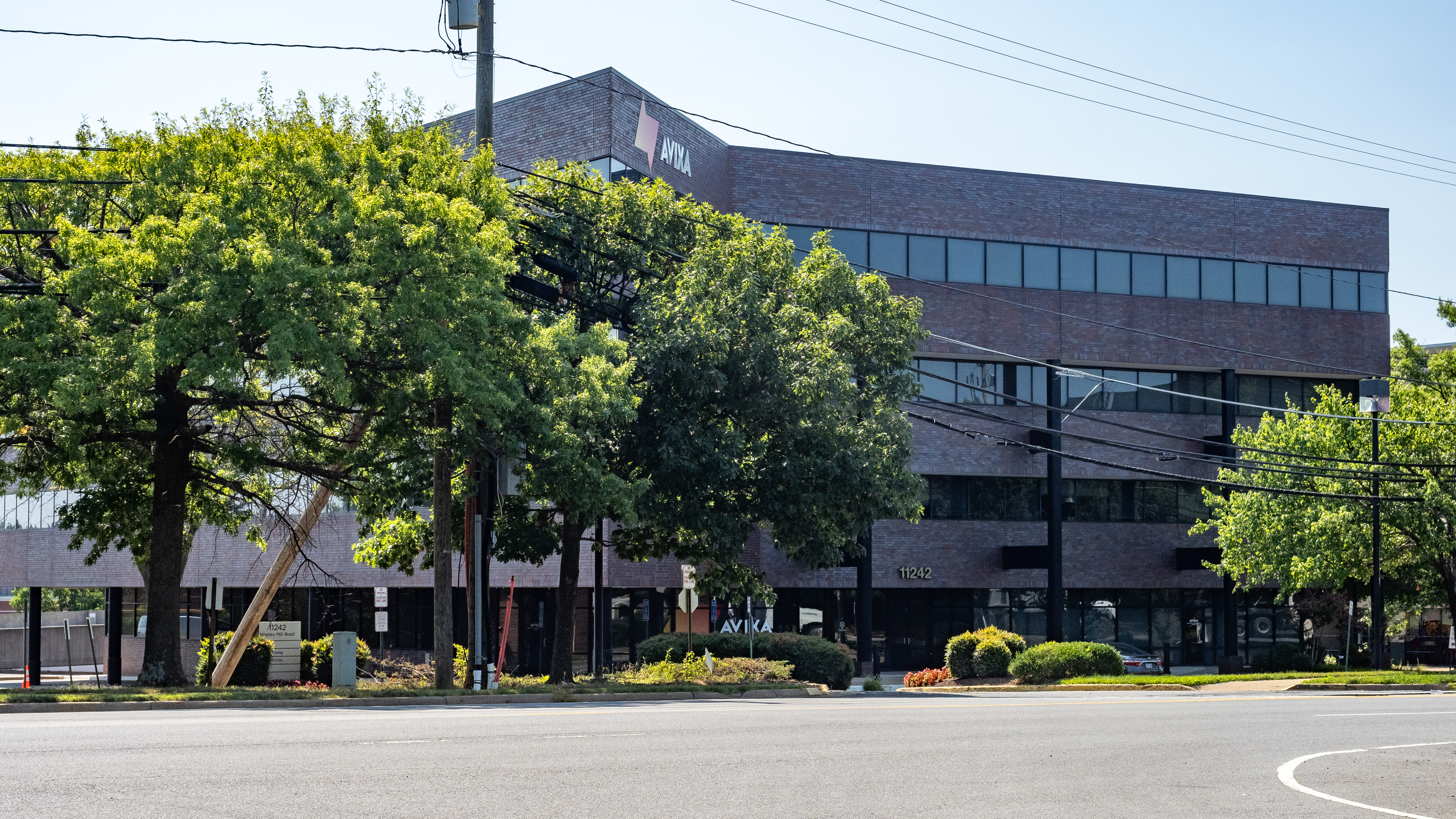
Headquarters (2024)

Audio visual and Integrated Experience Association (AVIXA) is a non-profit organization for audiovisual companies and related professionals headquartered in Fairfax, Virginia. AVIXA was formed originally as the National Association of Visual Education Dealers in 1939 and has merged with other organizations and changed names several times since then, most recently from InfoComm International to AVIXA in 2017.

AVIXA has over 11,400 members globally, with over 700 volunteers developing standards and training programs and holding trade shows to promote member products and solutions. Two of the largest trade shows are Integrated Systems Europe (a joint trade show between AVIXA and CEDIA - the Custom Electronic Design & Installation Association) and InfoComm (held in the USA).

== History ==
In 1939, eight dealers of audiovisual equipment formed the National Association of Visual Education Dealers (NAVED), with the goal of increasing American government funding of audiovisual equipment in education. The Allied Non-Theatrical Film Association was formed that same year in New York City, New York with Wilfred K. Knighton as secretary for producers and distributors of 16 mm film, visual education dealers, equipment manufacturers, libraries and related entities.

In 1941, President Franklin D. Roosevelt established the use of motion picture film to keep the public informed during World War II, marking increasing formalization of government use of the motion picture film medium for information dissemination. Interest in audiovisual solutions grew and in 1946 NAVED held its first convention with exhibits in Chicago, Illinois.

Due to the common goal of encouraging increased government funding of education, NAVED merged with the Allied Non-Theatrical Film Association in 1949 to form the National Audio-Visual Association (NAVA).

In 1983, NAVA changed names to the International Communications Industries Association (ICIA).

In 2005, ICIA changed names again to InfoComm International (or, more commonly, InfoComm).

In 2017, InfoComm International again changed its name to the Audiovisual and Integrated Experience Association, or AVIXA.

== Publications ==
AVIXA maintains a library of publications regarding current self-published audiovisual standards, recommended practices, guides and market research. Some of these standards are published jointly with the American National Standards Institute as AVIXA is accredited by ANSI as a Standards Developing Organization.

== Certifications ==
There are four certifications that AVIXA offers. Three are ANAB-accredited to the ISO 17024 standard and there are more than 13,000 certification holders throughout the world. The three certifications are the Certified Technology Specialist (CTS), Certified Technology Specialist - Installation (CTS-I), , Certified Technology Specialist - Design, and the newer ANP or audiovisual networking professional. Each certification is valid for three years and requires renewals and training.
