= Pipe Line Contractors Association =

The Pipe Line Contractors Association (PICA) is a petroleum industry trade group created in 1948 to handle labor relations in the pipeline construction industry. PICA negotiates labor contracts with the trade unions representing the four crafts involved in pipeline construction: the International Brotherhood of Teamsters, the International Union of Operating Engineers, the Laborers' International Union of North America, and the United Association of Plumbers & Pipefitters. In addition to administering the labor contracts (known as National Pipe Line Agreements), PICA promotes occupational health and safety practices in the pipeline construction industry.)

== National Pipe Line Agreements ==
National Pipe Line Agreements are labor contracted negotiated and administered by PICA. PICA negotiates labor contracts with the trade unions representing the four crafts involved in pipeline construction: the International Brotherhood of Teamsters, the International Union of Operating Engineers, the Laborers' International Union of North America, and the United Association of Plumbers & Pipefitters.
