= Roanoke Mountain =

Mountain in Virginia, United States

Coordinates: 37°12′34″N 79°56′07″W

Roanoke Mountain is a mountain in Virginia. It is located two miles south of the Roanoke River and one mile east of the Blue Ridge Parkway.

The summit of Roanoke Mountain may be reached by a one-way loop road which branches off the Blue Ridge Parkway. There are two overlooks on the summit ridge with excellent views to the west over Roanoke city and to the north. There is a geologically puzzling crater-like formation near the east end of the summit ridge.

Earlier, Roanoke Mountain was called Yellow Mountain
