= Hearth, Patio & Barbecue Association =

U.S. trade organization

Hearth, Patio & Barbecue Association (HPBA) is a U.S. trade organization that represents hearth appliance manufacturers, designers and retailers.

Headquartered in Arlington, Virginia, HPBA hosts industry conferences, lobbies for legislation at federal and state levels, and provides data on sales and manufacturing output for the hearth industry. HPBA has also worked with the U.S. Environmental Protection Agency to encourage the manufacturing and installation of hearth appliances that produce lower levels of air pollution.
