= Foot Levelers =

American health company

Foot Levelers is a foot care, footwear, and whole body health company based in Roanoke, Virginia, and owned by Kent S. Greenawalt.

== History ==
Foot Levelers began in Iowa, in 1952, by Chiropractor Monte H. Greenawalt. Greenawalt earned his degree from Lincoln Chiropractic College and began to notice a pattern in patients with foot problems—his adjustments did not hold. Dr. Monte referred these patients to a podiatrist, but their problems persisted.

Monte began to experiment with orthotics, and through trial and error, developed a formula based on 16 unique measurements of the foot. Unlike off-the-shelf orthotics or even those made by podiatrists, Monte’s orthotic was designed to support all three arches of the foot, rather than just one. Through Greenawalt's orthotics invention, his patients began to show positive results and his adjustments held longer.

In Foot Levelers multi-decade history, they have served tens of thousands of doctors and millions of patients through their patented orthotic technology. They have offices in the U.S., Canada, and Australia and serve customers in over 80 countries.

Foot Levelers holds title sponsorship of "America's Toughest Road Marathon", the Blue Ridge Marathon, since 2012.

== Research Studies ==
- ACRM (Archives of Physical Medicine and Rehabilitation), "Shoe Orthotics for the Treatment of Chronic Low Back Pain: A Randomized Controlled Trial"

== Sources ==
- "Dr. Amanda Bledsoe Branches Out! How to Successfully Go Solo After a Decade as an Associate". The American Chiropractor.
- "Foot Levelers Partners with Women Chiropractors Professional Organization, Donates $100,000". The American Chiropractor.
- "Will These Products Ease Your Back Pain?". The Doctors TV Show.
- "Foot Levelers Renews Title Sponsorship of Blue Ridge Marathon / Half Marathon Through 2021". The Roanoke Star.
- "F4CP partners with American Academy of Spine Physicians to enhance spine care". Chiropractic Economics.
- "Botetourt County students awarded VWCC scholarships". Roanoke Times.
- "A senior moment: Leaving a 'clean camp'". Chico Enterprise-Record. 2018-10-20.
- Times, Troy Sarver Special to The Roanoke. "Richmond runner smashes Blue Ridge Marathon record; Tech grad student wins women's race". Roanoke Times.
- Ostarly, Clay (2018-10-10). ""Cobots" to work with people, could prevent work injuries". VIRGINIAFIRST.
- "Reducing injury by correcting hyper pronation or supination in runners". www.runnerstribe.com. 27 October 2018.
- "Demand More From Your Doctors When Their Treatment Plan Is Opioids". Observer. 2018-02-05.
- "How To Relieve Knee Pain Naturally".
- "Proven: Foot Levelers + Chiropractic Care Significantly Reduce Chronic Low Back Pain--by 40.4 Percent". www.dynamicchiropractic.com. 27 June 2018.
- "Experiencing the Difference with Foot Levelers – Mami of Multiples". Mami of Multiples. 2017-10-11.
- Brookshier, Erin (22 August 2017). "Study shows Foot Levelers orthotics reduce back pain". www.wsls.com.
- "Foot levelers Announces Roanoke-based 3d Technology division" (PDF). BizNews. October 12, 2017.
- "Foot Levelers Blue Ridge Marathon". Delta Sky Magazine. October 2017.
- Dashiell, Joe. "Foot Levelers donates laptop computers to Roanoke City Public Schools". Archived from the original on 2018-11-07.
- HOLAHAN, DAVID. "Foot Scans Reveal A Lot: Modern Life Takes A Toll On Posture, With Ripple Effects". courant.com. Archived from the original on 2018-11-07.
- "Put Your Best Foot Forward for Better Health | Scoop News". www.scoop.co.nz.
- "Roanoke firefighters receive free custom orthotics during test". News/Talk 960-AM & FM-107.3 WFIR. 2017-05-18.
- "Foot Levelers announces schedule for "On the Level" Fall Webinar Series". Chiropractic Economics. May 4, 2018.
- "Postural Imbalance and Orthotic Support". Dynamic Chiropractic. August 15, 2006.
