= Print Services & Distribution Association =

International trade association

- Industry: Printing, Print distribution
- Headquarters: Chicago, IL, United States
- Area served: North America
- Key people: Matt Sanderson – Executive Vice President
- Products: Print Solutions Magazine, Print Solutions Weekly, PEAK Awards
- Services: Source Hotline, Print Solutions Conference & Expo, FOCUS Trade Shows, Technology Conference
- Number of employees: 30-50
- Website: www.psda.org

The Print Services & Distribution Association (PSDA) is an international trade association for the print distribution industry. Its members include some print distributors, print resellers, agencies, printers and suppliers.

== History ==
PSDA was initially established in 1946 as the National Business Forms Association (NBFA) and evolved into the Document Management Industries Association (DMIA) in the 1990s. The association changed its name in October 2007 to Print Services & Distribution Association (PSDA) in response to changes in the industry and to give a more accurate representation of its membership base. The rebranding was formally announced at the 2007 Print Solutions Conference & Expo at the Las Vegas Convention Center in Las Vegas, Nevada.

Currently, PSDA has over 1000 member companies that include print distributors, promotional products distributors, advertising agencies, design firms, freelancers, trade printers, commercial printers and industry suppliers. The majority of its membership is located within the United States, though it does boast some international affiliates. PSDA's headquarters is located in Chicago, IL.

== Events ==
PSDA hosts a diversity of national and regional events each year, some open only to members and others for anyone. These include a trade show and various other national conferences for large and small businesses and technological advancements in the industry. It also organizes local trade shows in various cities.

== Print Solutions Magazine ==
Print Solutions Magazine is a monthly trade publication that covers the print distribution industry. It has been published continuously since 1962 by PSDA, though it was previously known as FORM Magazine. It has won more than 100 awards. Each issue of the magazine contains relevant industry news, as well as sales, marketing, and management features to help readers improve their businesses, expand into new markets, and learn ways to sell print products and related services.

== Printjunkie.net ==
Printjunkie.net is a free social networking site developed to connect professionals in the printing industry.
