= American Society of Travel Advisors =

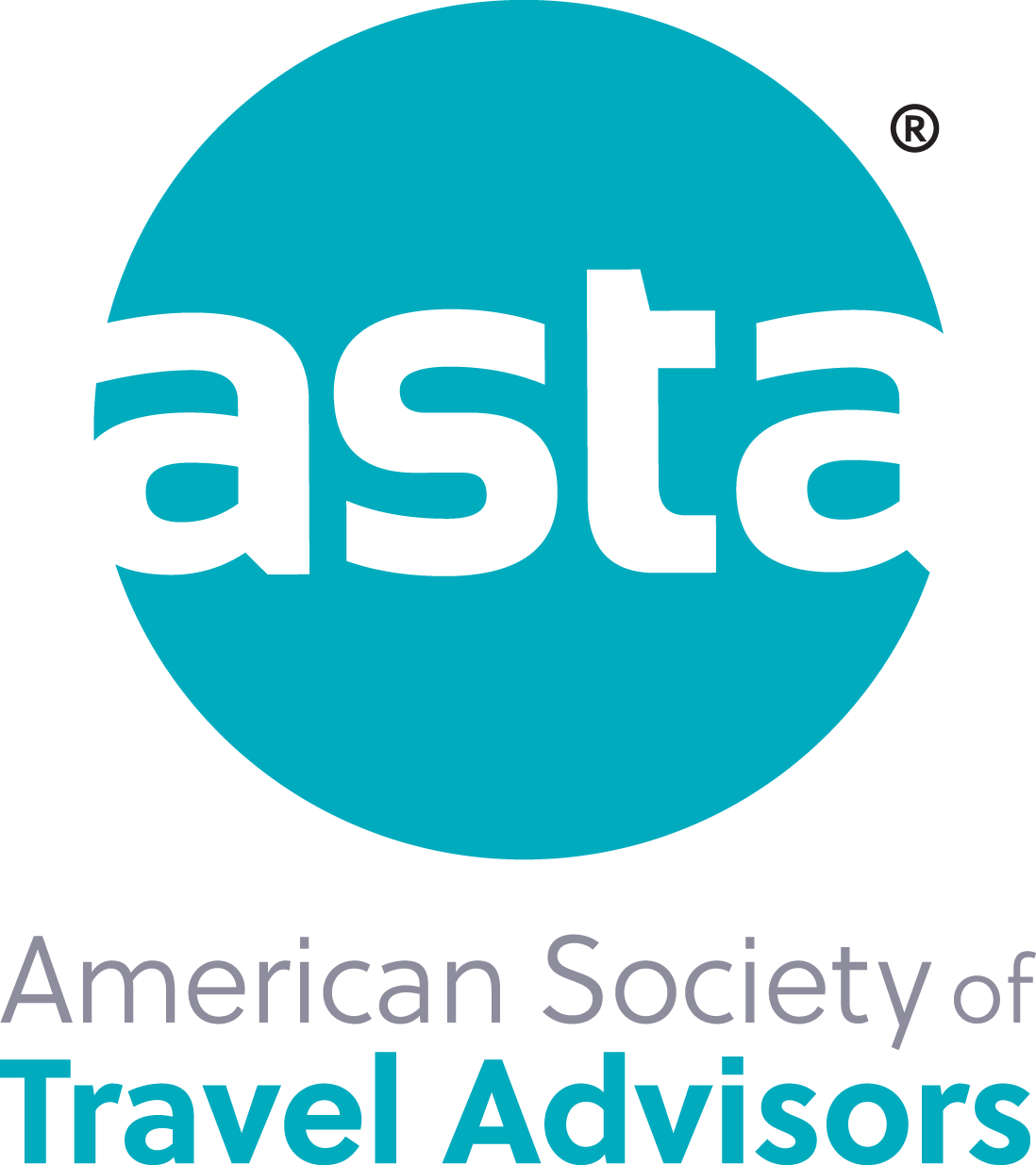
- Abbreviation: ASTA
- Predecessor: American Steamship and Tourist Agents Association
- Formation: April 20, 1931; 95 years ago
- Type: Nonprofit
- Legal status: 501(c)(6)
- Location: Alexandria, Virginia, United States
- Region served: Worldwide
- President and CEO: Zane Kerby
- Executive Vice President: Mark Meader
- Senior Vice President: Sarah Little
- Senior Vice President: Peter Lobasso
- Publication: Travel Advisor Magazine
- Website: www.asta.org
- Formerly called: American Society of Travel Agents

The American Society of Travel Advisors (abbreviated as ASTA) is a trade association which was formed to represent and defend the business and regulatory public policy interests of travel intermediaries, including travel agencies (including traditional "brick and mortar" agencies, online portals, mega- and corporate agencies, and small and mid-market businesses) and tour providers (including wholesalers and operators). The headquarters of the American Society of Travel Advisors is in Alexandria, Virginia, United States; it is a US Internal Revenue Service 501(c)(6) tax-exempt not-for-profit entity.

Its members adhere to a strict code of ethics and include travel agents, intermediaries, and supplier companies who offer travel products and services such as tours, cruises, hotels, destinations, tourist bureaus, ground transport, car rentals, local guides and hosts. leading advocate for travel advisors and the entire travel agency community, including suppliers and the traveling public.

== History ==
The American Society of Travel Advisors (ASTA) was founded on April 20, 1931, in New York City as the American Steamship and Tourist Agents Association. ASTA changed its name to the American Society of Travel Agents in 1944.

On January 26, 2000, ASTA acquired the assets of The National Association of Commissioned Travel Agents, Inc. (NACTA) which is now a membership subsidiary, called National Association of Career Travel Agents since 2009. NACTA represented independent travel agents, cruise-oriented agents, home-based travel agents and outside sales travel agents. On August 28, 2018, the organization was renamed to the American Society of Travel Advisors. NACTA was also rebranded into the ASTA Small Business Network.

In 2017, ASTA launched its Verified Travel Advisor certification program, intended to "build member knowledge about legal and ethical issues and boost consumer trust in ASTA agents." It revamped the program in 2024, adding a sales requirement and a recertification process.

ASTA supported the Travel Promotion, Enhancement, and Modernization Act of 2014 (H.R. 4450; 113th Congress), a bill that would extend the provisions of the Travel Promotion Act of 2009 (Pub. L. 111–145 (text) (PDF)), which established the Corporation for Travel Promotion (also known as Brand USA), through September 30, 2020, and impose new performance and procurement requirements on the corporation. ASTA President Zane Kerby said that the bill "is essential to marketing the United States as a desirable destination for international tourists, conferences and business."

In 2022, ASTA supported the Travel and Tourism Omnibus Act, which among other things, creates an Assistant Secretary of Travel and Tourism at the U.S. Department of Commerce, elevating the importance the U.S. travel industry plays at home and abroad.

In 2025, ASTA successfully lobbied against state tax initiatives aimed at the travel industry in Nebraska and Louisiana. It also launched VeriVacation.com, a consumer-facing platform designed to connect travelers with ASTA Verified Travel Advisors.

== Executive Committee, Board of Directors ==
The policies of ASTA are established by an Executive Committee and National Board of Directors.

2025-2026 Executive Committee

- Lee Thomas, Founder, NousTravel LLC (Chair)
- Eric Maryanov, President, All-Travel (Vice Chair)
- Anita Pagliasso, Vice President of Industry Relations, KHM Travel Group (Treasurer)
- Amanda Klimak, President and Co-Owner, Largay Travel (Corporate Advisory Council Chair)
- Zane Kerby, President and CEO (ex officio)

2025-2026 Board of Directors

- Chandra Brown, Cruise Planners - Independent Advisor Director
- Cindy Coggin, Coggin Travels - Director-at-Large
- Melinda Fortunato, Best Travel - Director-at-Large
- William Haire, Travelink - CAC Vice Chair
- Pamela Irwin, Mansour Travel / ATB Travel
- Amanda Klimak, Largay Travel
- Anne MacIntyre, On the Map Travel - Director-at-Large
- Eric Maryanov, All-Travel
- Anita Pagliasso, KHM Travel Group
- Virginia Peterson, Lake Shore Travel Service - Regional Director
- Lynda Phillippi, Renaissance Travel - Regional Director
- Shelly Phillips, Travel By That Girl - Regional Director
- Alex Sharpe, Signature Travel Network - Consortium Council Director
- Lee Thomas, NousTravel, LLC
- Cynthia Tyo, Travel Travel Fargo – Moorhead, Inc.- Director-at-Large

== Membership ==
Most members are based in the USA. ASTA is organized under New York State Corporation Law but located in Alexandria, Virginia, just outside Washington DC, to assist in its government and industry affairs.

Voting members are only US-domiciled Travel Agent Members and Premium Members. According to ASTA bylaws (last revised in August 2022), ASTA has fourteen membership categories:

- Travel Agency Member (also known as Core Member)
- Travel Agency Employee Member
- Non-Affiliated Member
- Host Agency Member
- Premium Agency Member
- Consortium Member
- Premium Agency Employee Member
- International Travel Agency Company Member
- International Travel Associate Member
- Allied Company Member
- Allied Associate Member
- Travel School Member
- Honorary Member
- Independent Contractor Member

== Events ==
ASTA Organizes conferences and industry events focused on professional development, networking and advocacy for travel advisors. In 2023, the organization rebranded its longtime annual convention as the ASTA Travel Advisor Conference, reflecting a greater emphasis on business skills and advisor growth. ASTA also operates an annual congressional fly-in known as ASTA Legislative Day and the ASTA River Cruise Expo, a specialty event that has received trade coverage for its rapid growth and scale.

== Partnerships ==
The organization's partners include Travel Industry Solutions, (TIS) Internova Travel Group, Signature Travel Network, Expedia Group, Explora Journeys, Bus Charter Service Travel, Celebrity Cruises, Norwegian Cruise Line, AmaWaterways, Virtuoso, Globus Family of Brands, Marriott, Chase Travel and many others.

== See also ==
- Airlines Reporting Corporation (ARC)
- International Air Transport Association (IATA)
- International Association of Travel Agents Network (IATAN)
- United States Tour Operators Association (USTOA)
- Pacific Asia Travel Association (PATA)
