= Personal Watercraft Industry Association =

American trade association

The Personal Watercraft Industry Association (PWIA) is an American association of personal watercraft (PWC) manufacturers. It is an affiliate of the larger National Marine Manufacturers Association, and was founded in 1987.

The PWIA promotes the use of PWCs, and lobbies government agencies on boating and environmental regulations.

== Members ==
- American Honda Motor
- Bombardier Recreational Products
- Kawasaki Heavy Industries
- Yamaha Motor Corporation

== See also ==
- American Power Boat Association
