= International Association of Elevator Consultants =

The International Association of Elevator Consultants, formerly National Association of Vertical Transportation Professionals, is an association of elevator consultants.

The group states that it was formed to share information and ideas, network, and weed out the under-qualified individuals claiming to be elevator consultants.

== Forums ==
The IAEC holds a forum every year, sometimes with international speakers. The next annual IAEC Forum, Forum 2023, will be held May 22–26, 2023 in Las Vegas, NV.

== Membership ==
Professional membership is only open to individuals and firms from the consulting segment of the elevator industry. Individuals and companies who sell or install elevators are allowed to join as Associate Members.

== See also ==
- International Union of Elevator Constructors
