= Nordson Corporation =

American multinational corporation

- Company type: Public
- Traded as: Nasdaq: NDSN; S&P 500 component
- Founded: 1954; 72 years ago
- Founder: Walter G. Nord
- Headquarters: Westlake, Ohio, U.S.
- Area served: Global
- Key people: Sundaram Nagarajan (president & CEO); Victor L. Richey, Jr. (chairman)
- Products: Precision Dispensing Equipment, Testing and Inspection Equipment, Surface Preparation and Curing Equipment
- Revenue: ▲US$2.79 billion (2025)
- Operating income: ▲US$712 million (2025)
- Net income: ▲US$484 million (2025)
- Total assets: ▼US$5.92 billion (2025)
- Total equity: ▲US$3.04 billion (2025)
- Owner: Jane B. Nord (5.2%)
- Number of employees: 8,000 (2025)
- Website: nordson.com
- Footnotes / references Financials as of October 31, 2025.

Nordson Corporation is an American multinational corporation that designs and manufactures dispensing equipment for consumer and industrial adhesives, sealants and coatings. The company also manufactures equipment used in the testing and inspection of electronic components, technology-based systems for curing and surface treatment processes as well as medical devices and component technologies. The company is headquartered in Westlake, Ohio, and has direct operations and sales-support offices in approximately 30 countries.

== Acquisitions ==
In November 2022, it was announced Nordson Corporation had completed the acquisition of the Minneapolis, Minnesota-headquartered developer and manufacturer of high-precision 3D optical sensing technology, CyberOptics Corporation.

In August 2023, Nordson completed the acquisition of ARAG Group of Italy for €960 million in an all-cash deal.

== Corporate structure and company culture ==
Nordson Corporation is headquartered in Westlake, Ohio, U.S., with its Global Headquarters located at 28601 Clemens Road, Westlake, Ohio 44145-4551. The company operates globally and comprises nine distinct divisions, each serving unique industry sectors:

- Nordson Adhesive Dispensing Systems
- Nordson EFD (Engineered Fluid Dispensing)
- Nordson Electronics Solutions
- Nordson Industrial Coating Solutions
- Nordson Measurement & Control
- Nordson Medical
- Nordson Polymer Processing Systems
- Nordson Precision Agriculture
- Nordson Test & Inspection

There are facilities and sales-support offices in approximately 30 countries.

== Finance ==
Key financial trends for Nordson Corporation are based on fiscal years ending October 31:

Year	Revenue (USD Billion)	Gross Profit (USD Billion)	Net Income (USD Billion)
1994	0.5067	0.3122	0.0467
2000	0.7406	0.4383	0.0546
2005	0.8392	0.4679	0.0783
2010	1.0400	0.6216	0.1681
2015	1.6900	0.9140	0.2111
2020	2.1200	1.1300	0.2495
2021	2.3600	1.3200	0.4543
2022	2.5900	1.4300	0.5131
2023	2.6300	1.4300	0.4875
2024	2.6900	1.4900	0.4673

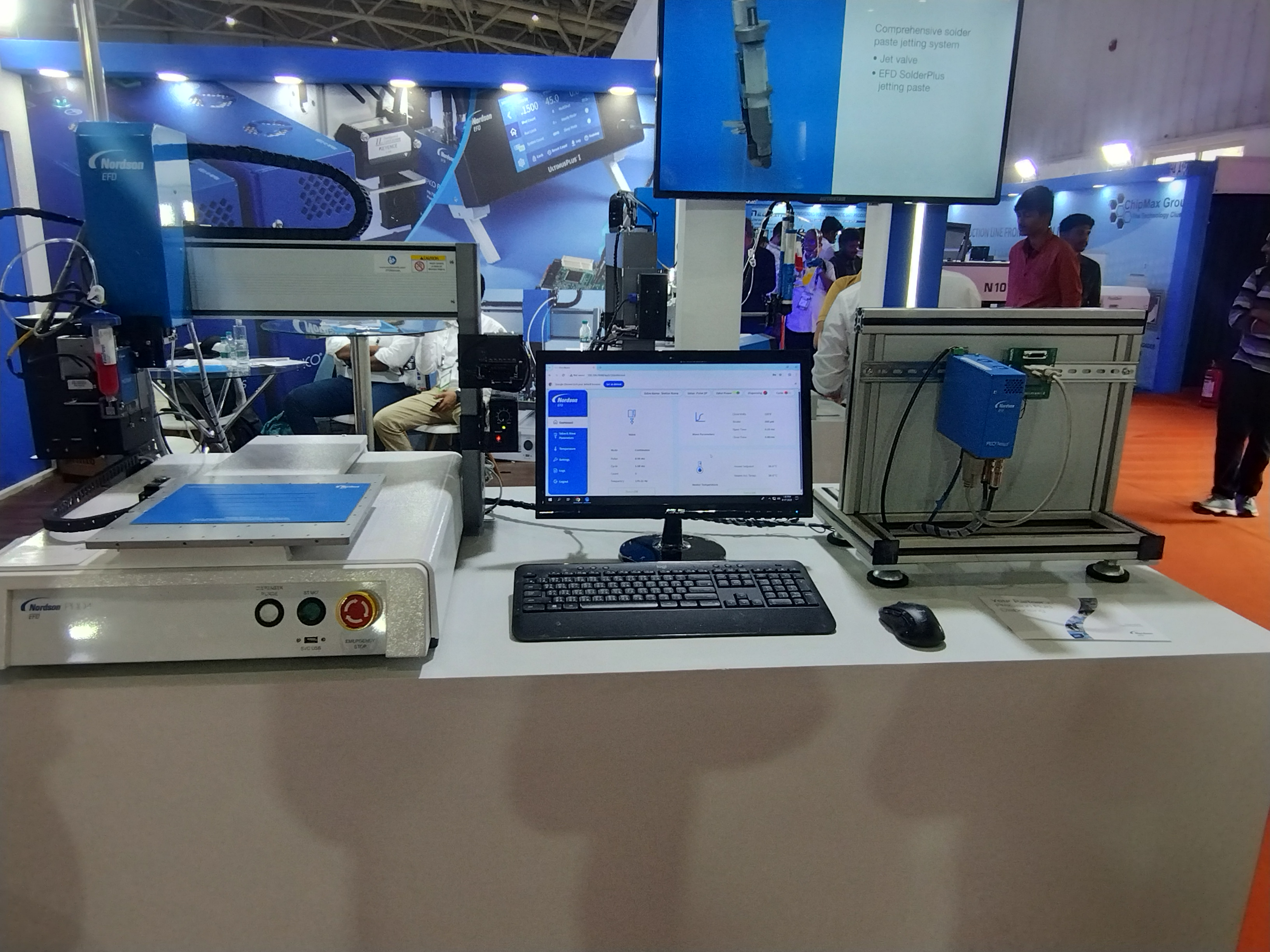
Nordson EFD fluid dispensing system products at Electronica 2025, BIEC
