= International Webmasters Association =

Professional association

Logo of the International Webmasters Association.

The International Webmasters Association (IWA) is a non-profit association for education and certification of web professionals founded in 1996. It provides a Certified Web Professional certification. One of its objectives is to build a World Wide Web that is a true global community. According to the IWA, as of 2025 it has more than 100 official chapters with over 300,000 individual members in 106 countries.

In 2001, the IWA merged with the HTML Writers Guild (HWG) and joined the World Wide Web Consortium (W3C). IWA's accomplishments include the publishing of the industry's first guidelines for ethical and professional standards, web certification and education programs, specialized employment resources, and technical assistance to individuals and businesses. IWA members participate to the activities of W3C WCAG Working Group, ATAG Working Group, and the XHTML Working Group. They have also participated in other initiatives such as the Multimodal Interaction Working Group which developed EMMA, the Extensible MultiModal Annotation markup language.
