= Bio Process Systems Alliance =

Biopharmaceutical industry trade group

Logo of the Bio Process Systems Alliance.

The Bio-Process Systems Alliance (BPSA) is a biopharmaceutical industry trade group of suppliers of single-use components and single-use systems for manufacturing processes. It was created in 2006 through an alliance of 26 suppliers.
