= List of food industry trade associations =

This is a list of food industry trade associations. A trade association is an organization founded and funded by businesses that operate in a specific industry. An industry trade association participates in public relations activities such as advertising, education, political donations, lobbying and publishing, but its focus is collaboration between companies. Associations may offer other services, such as producing conferences, networking or charitable events or offering classes or educational materials. Many associations are non-profit organizations governed by bylaws and directed by officers who are also members.

== Food industry trade associations ==
=== A ===
- American Cheese Society – promotes and supports American cheeses, including artisan and specialty cheeses
- American Frozen Food Institute – trade association and lobbying group for manufacturers and distributors of frozen food
- American Mushroom Institute
- American Pie Council
- Association of Food Industries (AFI)
- Assured Food Standards
- Australian Food and Grocery Council

=== B ===
- Bread Bakers Guild of America
- British Apples and Pears – the national trade body in the UK for the apple industry.
- British Sandwich Association – aims to improve the sandwich industry by setting standards and rewarding excellent sandwich manufacturers and retailers at the annual Sammies awards

=== C ===
- California Avocado Society
- Canada Beef
- Canadian Beef Check-Off Agency
- California Beer and Beverage Distributors
- Canadian Cattlemen's Association
- Canadian Meat Council
- Canadian Pork Council
- Consumer Brands Association
- Cornish Pasty Association
- Canadian Veal Association

=== E ===
- Efficient Consumer Response
- Europatat

=== F ===
- Federation of Oils, Seeds and Fats Associations
- FEFANA
- Florida Citrus Mutual
- Food and Drink Federation (UK)
- Food Federation Germany
- Food Products Association
- FoodDrinkEurope
- Freshfel Europe
- Food Production Solutions Association

=== G ===
- Grain and Feed Trade Association
- Grocery Manufacturers Association
- Guild of Bangladeshi Restaurateurs

=== I ===
- Idaho Potato Commission
- Independent Restaurant Coalition
- International Association of Engineering and Food
- International Association of Operative Millers
- International Bottled Water Association
- International Dairy-Deli-Bakery Association
- International Food Information Council
- International Foodservice Distributors Association
- International Foodservice Manufacturers Association

=== J ===
- Juice Products Association

=== L ===
- Local Authority Caterers Association
- Love Irish Food

=== M ===
- Meat Industry Association of New Zealand
- Melton Mowbray Pork Pie Association
- Montana Stockgrower's Association
- Mutton Renaissance Campaign

=== N ===
- National Association of Flavors & Food-Ingredient Systems (NAFFS)
- National Cattlemen's Beef Association
- National Chicken Council
- National Confectioners Association
- National Frozen & Refrigerated Foods Association
- National Hot Dog and Sausage Council
- National Registry of Food Safety Professionals
- National Restaurant Association
- National Turkey Federation
- National Yogurt Association
- Natural Products Association
- North American Meat Institute
- North American Meat Processors Association
- North American Olive Oil Association

=== P ===
- Plant Based Foods Association
- Potato Council
- Processed Vegetable Growers' Association
- Produce Marketing Association

=== S ===
- Scotland Food & Drink
- Scotty Brand Ltd
- Southern Hemisphere Association of Fresh Fruit Exporters
- Specialty Coffee Association of Indonesia
- Specialty Food Association
- Specialty Wine Retailers Association

=== T ===
- TRIDGE
- TURYID

=== U ===
- U.S. Poultry & Egg Association
- United States Brewers' Association
- Upcycled Food Association

=== W ===
- The Water Dispenser & Hydration Association
- Wisconsin Restaurant Association
- World Apple and Pear Association
- Worldwide Food Expo

== See also ==
- Employers' organization
