= Layering (horticulture) =

Plant propagation technique

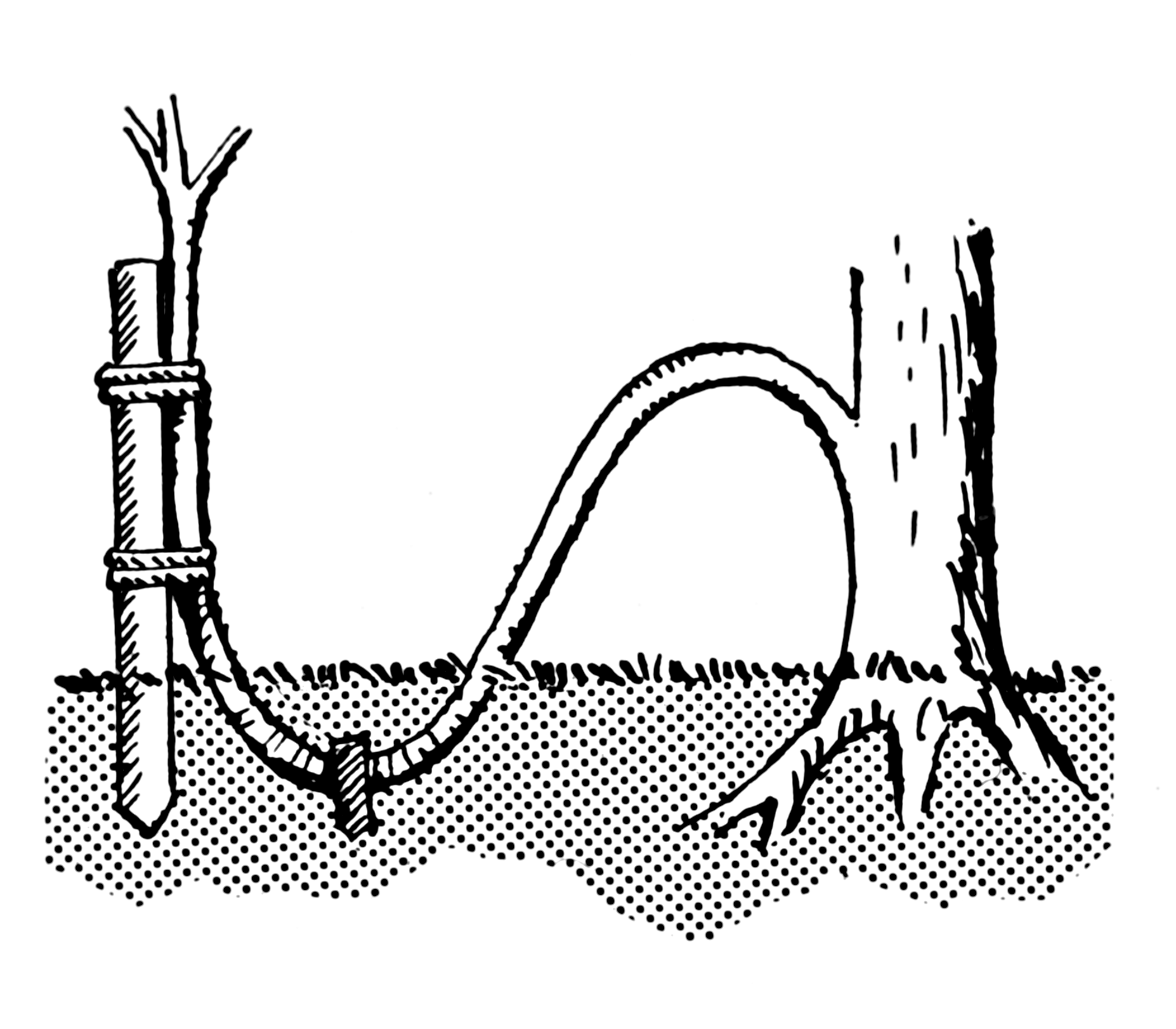
Layering

Layering is a vegetative propagation technique where the stem or branch of a plant is manipulated to promote root development while still attached to the parent plant. Once roots are established, the new plant can be detached from the parent and planted. Layering is utilized by horticulturists to propagate desirable plants.

Natural layering typically occurs when a branch touches the ground, whereupon it produces adventitious roots. At a later stage the connection with the parent plant is severed and a new plant is produced as a result.

Common types of layering include air or water layering, tip, Compound (serpentine), mound(stool), and air layering.

The horticultural layering process typically involves wounding the target region to expose the inner stem, called the inner cambium, and optionally applying rooting compounds.

Layering has the advantage that the propagated portion continues to receive water and nutrients from the parent plant while it is forming roots. This is important for plants that form roots slowly, or for propagating large pieces. Layering is used quite frequently in the propagation of bonsai; it is also used as a technique for both creating new roots and improving existing roots.

== Types of layering ==
In ground layering or simple layering, the stem is bent down and the target region is buried in the soil. This is done in plant nurseries in imitation of natural layering by many plants such as brambles which bow over and touch the tip on the ground, at which point it grows roots and, when separated, can continue as a separate plant. In either case, the rooting process may take from several weeks to a year.

Compound or serpentine layering consists of multiple simple layers on one branch. Target regions are buried then reemerge from the soil, including at least one bud between the buried regions. This results in multiple propagules, or baby plants, from one stem or branch. The end results looks like a serpent swimming in water.

Tip layering involves burying a shoot tip of a low hanging branch to initiate root development. Start by digging a small hole approximately 3-4 inches, Create a small wound on the bottom of the shoot tip you intend on propagating. Then optionally apply rooting hormone. Bend the desired branch tip to the ground, leaving 6-12 inches of the branch exposed. Then, bury the entire shoot tip. The shoot tip will produce new roots and emerge from the soil.

In Mound Layering, also known as stool layering, a mound is created at the base of the parent plant which aids the formation of adventitious roots from the base of the bottom branches. First, select branches desired for propagation that are close to where the main stem meets the soil. Then, lightly wound the underside of each branch where root formation is desired, and add rooting hormone if desired. Then, a mound is created with moist media around the base of the plant, enclosing the wounded branches but leaving the tips of the branches exposed.

== Methods and processes ==
For simple layering, a low-growing stem is bent down to touch a hole dug in the ground, then pinned in place using something shaped like a clothes hanger hook and covered over with soil. However, a few inches of leafy growth must remain above the ground for the bent stem to grow into a new plant. Removing a section of skin from the lower-facing stem part before burying may help the rooting process. If using rooting hormone, the stem should be cut just beneath a node. The resultant notch should be wedged open with a toothpick or similar piece of wood and the hormone applied before burying.

The buried stem part then grows new roots which take hold in the soil while the above parts grow as individual new plants. Once the end of the stem has grown long enough the process can be repeated, creating the appearance of a row of plants linked by humped, intermittently buried stems. Better results can be achieved when the top of the plant is closer to the vertical.

Once the process is completed, the buried section should be kept well-watered until roots begin to form. The new individual plant may require one to two years before it is strong enough to survive on its own. When it is, the original stem should be cut where it enters the ground, thereby separating the two plants.

== Plants types and benefits ==
As layering does not involve sexual reproduction, new plants are effectively clones of the original plant and will exhibit the same characteristics. This includes flower, fruit and foliage. Plant selection of simple layering usually involves plants with a flexible stem, such as blackberries, where as air layering typically involves semi-woody to woody shrubs and trees

Simple layering can be more attractive when managing a cascading or spreading plant. These plants tend to propagate in this manner anyway, and potting a new limb will give extra plants without having to sow new seed.

Simple layering can also help when a plant has overgrown its pot and is drooping over the side. The long stem is layered into another pot until it roots, thus bringing it back to soil level.

== Environmental conditions ==
The media's pH should be close to neutral, up to one increment towards acidity.

Media should remain moist, yet well aerated. Sphagnum mosses spongey characteristics provides this well. Light should be restricted from the target area.

== Ground layering ==
Ground layering or mound layering is the typical propagation technique for the popular Malling-Merton series of clonal apple root stocks, in which the original plants are set in the ground with the stem nearly horizontal, which forces side buds to grow upward. After these are started at the start of the growing season, the original stem is buried up to some distance from the tip. At the end of the growing season, the side branches will have rooted, and can be separated while the plant is dormant. Some of these will be used for grafting rootstocks, and some can be reused in the nursery for the next growing season's crop.

Ground layering is used in the formation of visible surface roots, known as "nebari", on bonsai trees.

== Air layering ==
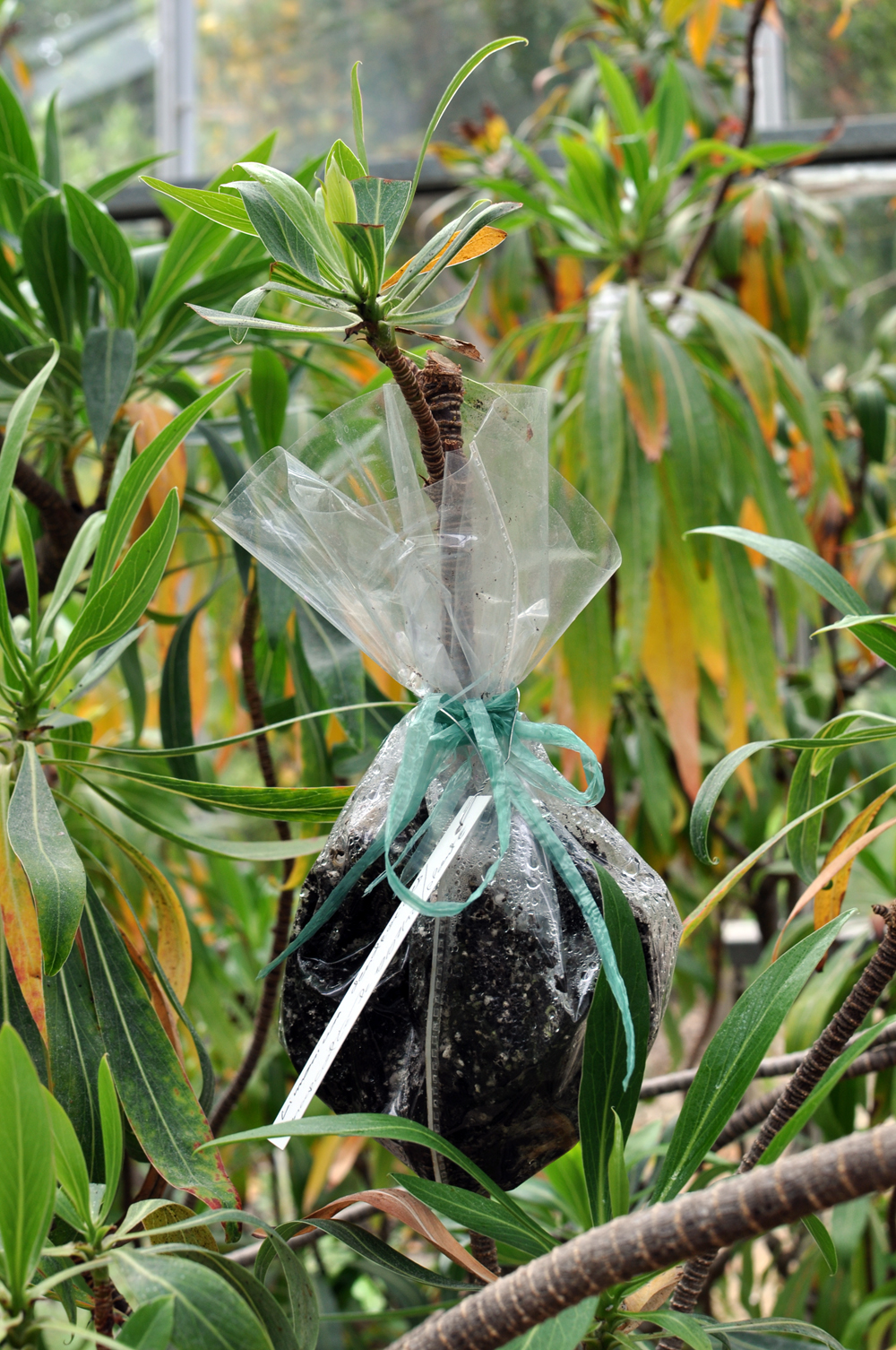
Air layering of Limonium dendroides

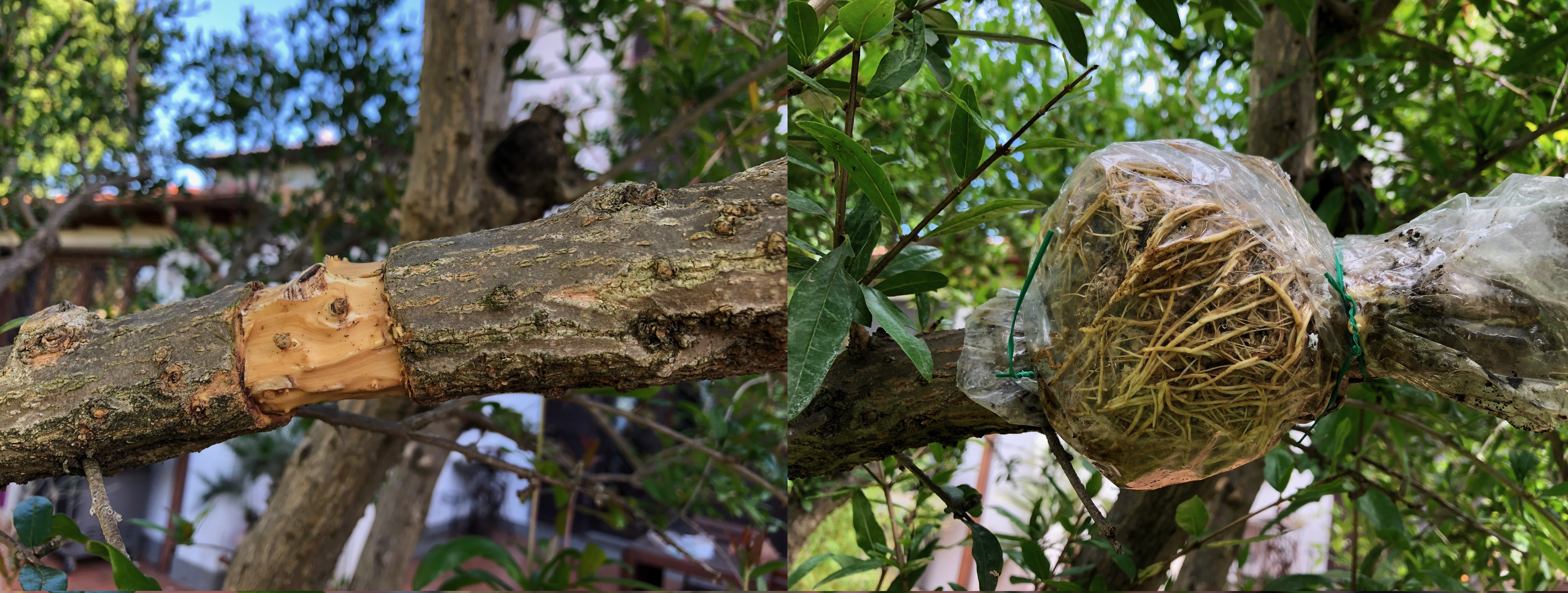
Air layer of a pomegranate branch.

In air layering (or marcotting), the target region is girdled, which involves making two cuts with a sharp razor or knife around the entire circumference of the branch or stem, approximately 1 to 1 1/2 inches apart. The bark between these two incisions is then stripped down to the white inner bark, or inner cambium layer. This is important to strip the outer cambium, or green layer right below the bark is removed, or else the branch may focus the energy on healing the wound rather than root production. One shallow incision is made between the girdled region by an upward 4 cm long cut and held open with a toothpick or similar, or a strip of bark is removed. The wound is then surrounded with a lump of moisture-retaining medium such as sphagnum moss or cloth, and then further surrounded by a moisture barrier such as plastic film tied or taped to the branch to prevent moisture loss or ingress of too much water as from rain. Rooting hormone is often applied to the wound to encourage root growth. When sufficient roots have grown from the wound, the stem is removed from the parent plant and planted, taking care to shield it from too much sun and to protect it from drying out until the new roots take hold. It can take the layer from a few weeks to one or more growing seasons to produce sufficient roots; this is largely dependent on the plant species and the vigor of the parent plant.

== See also ==
- Coppicing
- Hedge laying
- Cashew of Pirangi
