= Canada Beef =

Canadian trade and marketing organization

Canada Beef, formerly the Beef Information Centre, is a Canadian trade and marketing organization.

== History ==
In 2008, the BIC teamed up with the Canadian Cattlemen's Association and the Canadian Pork Council to disseminate information at the height of the WTO trade dispute over the mandatory country-of-origin labeling (mCOOL) rules.

The beef export trade of Canada was the world's eighth biggest in 2013, with annual shipments of $22.9bn.

The beef industry was, at least in 2015, the largest sector of the Canadian food manufacturing industry.

Canada Beef funded the Canadian Beef Centre of Excellence in Calgary, Alberta. The Centre was opened in March 2015 after a nine-month construction. It serves as a marketing and food education centre, with a demonstration kitchen, a full-HACCP "fabrication room" and broadcast capabilities.

In July 2019, Canada Beef received a $5.3 million subsidy from the Trudeau government "in order to grow sales internationally, in part by boosting foreign consumer confidence in Canada's product".

In March 2025, Canada Beef launched the Best Canadian Beef Dishes Contest, a nationwide competition encouraging diners to nominate their favourite beef dishes at local restaurants. The winning restaurant will receive a prize valued at CAD 5,000.

== Leadership ==
In July 2019, Michael Young was president of Canada Beef.

== Funding ==
The organization is funded by virtue of the Canadian Beef Cattle Check-Off.

== See also ==
- List of food industry trade associations
