= British Apples and Pears =

- Formation: January 25, 1990; 36 years ago
- Founded at: Kent, United Kingdom
- Location: Lincolnshire, United Kingdom
- Products: Apples
- Formerly called: English Apples and Pears

British Apples and Pears is the national trade body in the UK for the apple industry.

== Former organisations ==
The Apple and Pear Development Council was formed from December 15 1966, from efforts by Mr FJ French, a Kent apple grower. This organisation was an industrial development board, created under the rules of the Industrial Organisation and Development Act 1947. It levied 30s each year, until 1970, when it rose to 60s.

Spring frosts had limited production in the 1960s, but 1964 had a full amount of around 580,000 tons. A typical yearly amount was 550,000 tons, of which 300,000 tons would be dessert apples, which could include 200,000 tons of Cox's Orange Pippin. The council was officially dissolved in November 1989.

In the late 1970s, John Palmer, 4th Earl of Selborne was commissioned to produce an important report on French apple imports. This important report in February 1980 of the Top Fruit Working Group, had many searching recommendations. One of the recommendations was to look more deeply at scientific research. The Apple and Pear Development Council, through having other different interests of a commercial nature, had not been able to conduct enough valid scientific research, so it was decided to dissolve the APDC, and English Apples and Pears would take over this trade promotion of the apple and pear industry. This function had been mostly what the APDC had previously been able to do.

The APDC's scientific research was replaced by the Apple and Pear Research Council (APRC) in December 1989, which was dissolved in April 2003, to become part of the Horticultural Development Council, which became part of the AHDB in 2008. This became AHDB Horticulture, until discontinued in April 2022.

== History ==
The organisation began in Kent in the early 1990s.

In April and May 1997, severe frosts damaged orchards, giving the worst crop since 1934. Instead of 300,000 tonnes, output was expected at around 150,000 tonnes.

In 2010 it represented around 400 growers across country.

In 2014, the UK was the 39th largest producer of apples in the world. It produced 202,900 tonnes in 2012, down by half from 416,200 tonnes twenty five years before. Two-thirds of the nation's requirement for apples are imported; much of this is frozen for 12 months or more. The food industry is Britain's largest manufacturing industry, employing 1 in 8 people. In the 1970s and 1980s the EEC gave funding to British farmers for the removal of orchards. The lowest point of the British apple industry was 2003, with 143,900 tonnes produced.

Since 2010 British industry advertising could not claim any health benefits of apples, if not approved by the European Food Safety Authority (EFSA).

== Apple imports ==
In the 1960s, the UK imported around 15,000 tonnes of apples. After joining the EEC in 1973, this jumped to around 80,000 tonnes of apples. In 1978 this became 100,000 tonnes, and by 1980 it was around 300,000 tonnes, mostly from France. UK consumption was 700,000 tonnes, and British growers supplied 280,000 tonnes.

By 2014 imports were 444,000 tonnes from Europe. South Tyrol in Italy also produces much apples.

== British production ==
In 1992, 40% of the apples eaten in the UK were British-grown. Britain sold £11m of apple exports, but bought £220m of apple imports, largely Golden Delicious not France. There were nine main apple cultivars grown in the UK. Cox's were two thirds of British-grown dessert apples. Another main British cultivar was the Discovery (apple).

But by 1993 supermarkets were taking more interest in British cultivars of apples, than the ubiquitous Golden Delicious. In 1995, microbiologist Prof Renton Righelato found that on average UK citizens consume around 14kg of apples per year, the lowest in the EU; the EU average consumption was around 23 kg per year. Since 1995, production per hectare has vastly increased in the UK.

== Structure ==
It was registered on 25 January 1990 as English Apples and Pears (EAP), its former name. The name changed on 9 October 2019.

It moved from Kent to Lincolnshire in December 2017.

== See also ==
- Fernhurst Research Station in West Sussex, formerly of ICI Plant Protection Division
- List of countries by apple production
- List of countries by pear production
- Malling series, developed by Sir Ronald Hatton
- World Apple and Pear Association
- Worshipful Company of Fruiterers
