= IDFA =

IDFA may refer to:

- International Documentary Film Festival Amsterdam, an annual film festival
- International Dairy Foods Association, host of one half of the Worldwide Food Expo
- Identifier for Advertisers, a unique advertising identifier for Apple devices

== See also ==
- Idfa, a village in Egypt
