= Young Food Chemists =

Young Food Chemists Association
- AG Junge Lebensmittelchemie
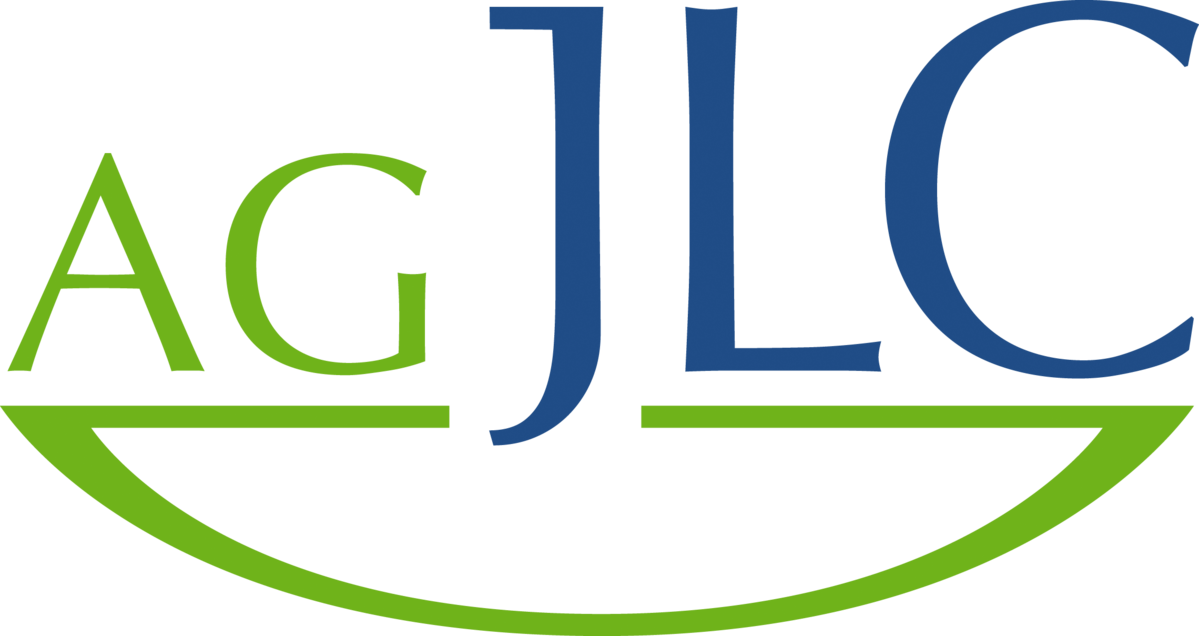
- logo of the AG JLC
- Nickname: AG JLC
- Formation: September 23, 1996; 30 years ago
- Founded at: Freiburg (Breisgau)
- spokespersons: Ricarda Haußwald, Laurenz Küchner
- Website: ag-jlc.de

The working group Young Food Chemists (Arbeitsgruppe Junge Lebensmittelchemie, AG JLC) is a group of German university and PhD students as well as young professionals who represent the interests of students and trainees in the field of food chemistry, i.e. analytical chemistry with a focus on food.

The group acts as an independent working group of the German Food Chemical Society, an expert group of the Society of German Chemists.

== General ==
=== History ===
In 1996, ten food chemistry students from different cities founded the AG JLC in Freiburg (Breisgau), Germany. Their goals were the representation of food chemistry students, public relations work and setting up a platform for students from different universities to connect.

Since its foundation in 1996, over 40 national conferences took place. Through the voluntary work of the members different kinds of guidelines were verbalized, posters designed, workshops at subject -specific as well as interdisciplinary conferences organized and held.

A detailed chronicle was prepared in 2015/2016 and published as a casebound book at the AG JLC's 20th anniversary in the context of the Deutscher Lebensmittelchemikertag (Congress of German Food Chemists) 2016 in Munich.

=== Structure ===
Local acting groups of the AG JLC are present at all German universities which offer courses in food chemistry. They are supported in form of registered student groups at the universities.

On a national level the AG JLC is a democratic organization. Elections take place during the main annual meeting. Head of the AG JLC are two spokesperson (usually a woman and a man) who are elected alternatingly for a period of two years. Furthermore, the AG JLC has a representative in the managing board of the German Food Chemical Society (Lebensmittelchemische Gesellschaft), where he or she takes part in decisions by voting. The representative is elected every third year, whereas the elections of the treasurer and the secretary take place biennially.

Everyone taking part in the national conference is allowed to vote and run for the different positions.

== Goals ==
The goals of the AG JLC include:

- Scientific support for students
- Encouragement of nationwide communication and exchange between universities
- Constant improvement and update of information concerning the different university degrees such as Diploma, State Exam, Bachelor, Master and PhD in Germany and abroad, approval of the degrees, practical year and first jobs
- Improvement and standardization of the conditions during the practical year such as the amount of training vacancies in order to complete the state exam
- Establishment of local and national corporations with other work groups e.g. the Young Chemistry Network (JCF)
- Increase the awareness of food chemistry and food chemists in society
- Setup of a network which overcomes borders of age and scientific fields
- Representation of interests in the German Food Chemical Society

== Functioning ==
=== Regional work ===
To offer non-university education, the local AG JLC groups organize conferences, field trips and workshops. The focus lies on public relations and on broadening the network, too.

=== National work ===
A national conference with members of each local group is held twice a year. Each year, the conference in September is held on the weekend before the Congress of German Food Chemists in the same town. In contrast to this, the spring conference is usually held in March in another town. The discussed topics include current issues, the organization of nationwide projects, networking and the exchange of ideas and experiences.

The steady cooperation of regional and national structures distinguishes the AG JLC from similar organizations. Some results of this successful strategy are:

- the set-up and update of information brochures about the State Exam, the practical year and the following start in the first job
- the development and evaluation of a survey on the starting salary in the field of food chemistry
- the shooting of a short clip representing the work of a food chemist
- the realization of an annual workshop during the Congress of German Food Chemists and on many regional conferences
- the formulation of papers and statements

=== Cooperations ===
Regional and national corporation partners are the German Food Chemical Society, the Society of German Chemists with the Young Chemistry Network (JCF), food chemists in governmental positions (Lebensmittelchemiker/-innen im öffentlichen Dienst (BLC)) as well as the Food Federation Germany (BLL). The contact is maintained on joint projects, conferences and workshops.

== Awards ==
In 2017 the two AG JLC spokespersons were awarded as STEM-ambassadors during the STEM future conference in Berlin.

At the Congress of German Food Chemists 2018 in Berlin, the AG JLC, represented by its founding member Dr. Jörg Häseler, was honored with the Adolf-Juckenack-Medal for the efforts for the Food Chemical Society and the profession of Food Chemists.
