= Apples and Pears =

Apples and pears may refer to:

- Apples and Pears, a book by Guy Davenport
- Stairs (rhyming slang)

== See also ==
- World Apple and Pear Association
- Apples and oranges (disambiguation)
- Rhyming slang
