= GAFTA =

The abbreviation GAFTA can refer to

- Grain and Feed Trade Association
- Council of Arab Economic Unity#Greater Arab Free Trade Area
