= Michelle Fountain =

British entomologist and ecologist

- Education: University of Reading (PhD)
- Scientific career
- Workplaces: East Malling Research Station

Michelle Fountain is a British entomologist and ecologist, she is Head of Pest and Pathogen Ecology at the National Institute of Agricultural Botany's East Malling Research Station.

== Education and career ==
Fountain studied her doctorate at the University of Reading, her focus was on springtails (Collembola) in urban soils.

== Research ==
Fountain's research looks at integrated pest management techniques to reduce pest insects on temperate fruit, such as using pheromones to reduce insect pests in commercial crops. She led some of the first work to quantify the role of [hoverflies] in [pollinating] [strawberry] crops, she showed that hoverflies can reduce pests by predating on aphids as larvae and then pollinating fruit flowers as adults.

Fountain has researched control methods for the pest insect spotted wing drosophila in the UK. She researched how earwigs could be beneficial in orchards, as they can eat pest of fruit trees such as wooly aphid and codling moth. Fountain contributed to research on ecological management of fruit orchards to help control insect pests,. especially through floral management.

She appeared on BBC Radio 4 Today Programme in 2014 talking about the unusual abundance of fruit flies and explained this was likely due to a mild winter.

In 2019 she edited a book 'Integrated management of diseases and insect pests of tree fruit' with Professor Xiangming Xu, published by Burleigh Dodds Science Publishing.

Her publication list can be found at
