= Palliser Furniture =

Canadian furniture manufacturer

Palliser Furniture Ltd.
- Type: Private
- Industry: Furnishings
- Founded: 1944; 82 years ago
- Headquarters: Winnipeg, Manitoba, Canada
- Products: Upholstered furniture
- Number of employees: 2,000
- Subsidiaries: EQ3
- Website: www.palliser.com

Palliser Furniture is a family-owned furniture manufacturing company headquartered in Winnipeg, Manitoba, Canada.

As of at least 2016, the company was the largest manufacturer of made-to-order leather furniture in North America.

Palliser Furniture is the parent company of EQ3, a furniture manufacturer and retailer in Canada and parts of the US.

== History ==
In 1944, Abram Albert DeFehr, a Russian-born immigrant to Canada, began making wooden pieces in the basement of his Winnipeg home. Within a few years, the business moved from the basement into a former chicken barn, which became Palliser Furniture's first factory.

In 2004, DeFehr Furniture, then a division of Palliser, split off into a separate company focused on casegoods. DeFehr Furniture would eventually close in 2022.

In 2016, Canadian Business named Palliser as one of "Canada’s Best Managed Companies" of the year. Also that year, Palliser was listed as one of the "Top Canadian companies" by FDMC 300.

In 2018, Peter Tielmann was appointed president and CEO of Palliser Furniture, the family business of his wife. Art DeFehr, son of founder Abram Albert DeFehr, was then appointed chairman.

In early 2020, with the advent of the COVID-19 pandemic, Palliser closed its Winnipeg facility for two weeks and temporarily laid off 72% of its workforce, totaling around 500 factory workers and office staff.

In September 2021, as result of a complaint by Palliser Furniture, the Canadian International Trade Tribunal said that the dumping and subsidizing of certain upholstered furniture originating in or exported from Vietnam and China had "caused injury to the domestic industry." As such, Canada imposed new anti-dumping and countervailing duties on furniture imports from the two countries.

The new tariffs caused a spike in demand from domestic furniture companies and, in April 2022, Palliser said that it would be adding a new 12,000 m^{2} (3.0 acres) building to its upholstery manufacturing campus in Winnipeg. It also said that it would be increasing production capacity in Mexico.

== Operations ==
All upholstered products by Palliser are manufactured in North America. Palliser Furniture's main operations take place in Canada and Mexico, as well as the United States, thanks to the North American Free Trade Agreement which allows for tariff-free movement of supplies within the continent.

Most of the research & development, design, and financing duties—in addition to hundreds of assembly positions—are based in Winnipeg, in Western Canada.

While raw materials are gathered from a supply chain around the world, the focus is on sourcing products from Canada, Mexico, and the US. For instance, wooden feet come from either Mexico or Montreal, furniture mechanisms come from Mississippi, and fabrics often are transported in both directions from North Carolina.

The cutting and sewing of custom leather furniture by Palliser begins in Saltillo and Torreón in northern Mexico. The final assembly of furniture is done in either Mexico or Canada, depending on which site can most easily ship to the order destination. If the order is destined for Mexico or the United States, components are assembled in one of Palliser's Mexican plants. If for Canada, the leather cover is transported by truck to Palliser's plant in Winnipeg, where the furniture foam is cut along with the frame that will be covered by the Mexican-sewn segments.

== EQ3 ==
EQ3
- Industry: modern furniture
- Founded: 2001; 25 years ago
- Founder: Peter Tielmann
- Headquarters: Winnipeg, Manitoba
- Area served: Canada and US
- Key people: Mark Letain, President
- Brands: EQ3+
- Parent: Palliser Furniture Ltd.

EQ3 is a modern furniture designer, manufacturer, and retailer in Canada and parts of the US, owned by Palliser Furniture Ltd. The company offers custom made-to-order upholstery, along with furniture and home décor. It also has a designer line called EQ3+.

Headquartered in Winnipeg, Manitoba, the company has 17 stores across Canada and the US as of 2023:

- Alberta: Calgary
- British Columbia: Vancouver (South Granville)
- Manitoba: Winnipeg (Polo Park)
- Ontario: Burlington; Ottawa (Byward Market); and Toronto (Liberty Village + King Street East)
- Quebec: Brossard (Quartier DIX30); Laval; Montreal (Griffintown + Saint-Laurent); and Quebec City (Galeries de la Capitale)
- California: San Francisco (Design District); Emeryville location has closed
- Connecticut: Norwalk
- Illinois: Chicago (Lincoln Park)
- New York: New York City (Chelsea, Manhattan)

=== History ===
The company was founded in 2001 by Peter Tielmann, who was part of his wife's family business at Palliser Furniture, later becoming Palliser's president and CEO.

In May 2014, EQ3 opened a new 12,000 ft^{2} (1,100 m^{2}) showroom in San Francisco's Design District, the company's second U.S. location after Emeryville, California (now permanently closed). In 2019, the company announced further expansion in the US with three new retail locations: two in Chicago and a flagship in New York City, bringing EQ3 to 5 total locations in the US. The Chicago locations included one in The Shops at North Bridge mall in downtown, and one in Lincoln Park. The New York store would be located in Chelsea.

In 2021, EQ3 opened a 44,000 ft^{2} (1.0 acre) flagship store at the Polo Park shopping mall in Winnipeg.
