= WAPA =

WAPA may refer to:

- WAPA (AM), a radio station (680 AM) licensed to serve San Juan, Puerto Rico
- WAPA-TV, a television station (channel 4 virtual/27 digital) licensed to serve San Juan, Puerto Rico
- WVOZ (AM), a radio station (1260 AM) licensed to serve Ponce, Puerto Rico, which held the WAPA call sign from 2022 to 2024
- WMTI (AM), a radio station (1160 AM) licensed to serve Barceloneta-Manatí, Puerto Rico, which held the WAPA call sign from May to June 2022
- Western Area Power Administration, a United States Federal Government Administration within the Department of Energy
- Warsaw Pact, an organization of communist states created in 1955 to counter NATO
- Amahai Airport, in Amahai, West Papua, Indonesia (ICAO code WAPA)
- World Apple and Pear Association, an industry body representing major apple and pear producing countries globally
