= Act to amend the Department of Foreign Affairs, Trade and Development Act (supply management) =

Canadian farm trade statute

An Act to amend the Department of Foreign Affairs, Trade and Development Act (supply management

Parliament of Canada
- Citation: SC 2025, c. 1
- Royal assent: 26 June 2025

Legislative history
- Bill title: C-202
- Introduced by: Yves-François Blanchet
- First reading: 29 May 2025 (House of Commons)
- Second reading: 5 June 2025 (House of Commons)
- Third reading: 5 June 2025 (House of Commons)
- First reading: 10 June 2025 (Senate)
- Second reading: 12 June 2025 (Senate)
- Third reading: 17 June 2025

The Act to amend the Department of Foreign Affairs, Trade and Development Act (supply management) (French: Loi modifiant la Loi sur le ministère des Affaires étrangères, du Commerce et du Développement (gestion de l’offre) is a statute passed by the Parliament of Canada to provide trade protection for the Canadian agricultural supply management industries: dairy, poultry, and eggs.

The act was not a government measure. It was the product of a pair of private member's bills introduced by members of the Bloc Québécois party. The first was Bill C-282, which had passed the House of Commons and was under committee consideration in the Senate when it died on 6 January 2025 following Prime Minister Justin Trudeau's announcement that Parliament would be prorogued, thereby ending the parliamentary session. The bill was re-introduced following the 2025 federal election by Yves-François Blanchet, the leader of the Bloc Québécois, as Bill C-202. It passed both houses in the initial session of the new Parliament, receiving royal assent on 26 June 2025.

The dairy industry lobbied intensively for bills C-202 and C-282. Opposition came from industries that are competitive internationally and that rely on access to international markets including beef, cereals, and canola. They argued that the bills would set a bad protectionist precedent for a country reliant on trade.

Trade experts say the protection afforded by the act is unprecedented, since no other country prohibits its government from including specific commodities in trade negotiations.

== Summary of the Act ==
The act places two restrictions on the authority of the Minister of Foreign Affairs, Trade and Development when negotiating international trade treaties:

- The minister cannot commit the Government of Canada to increase the tariff-free import quota for dairy products, poultry or eggs (i.e., the quantity of these products that can be imported without a tariff).
- The minister cannot make any commitments to reduce the tariff applicable to these goods when they are imported in excess of the tariff-free import quota.

== Background ==
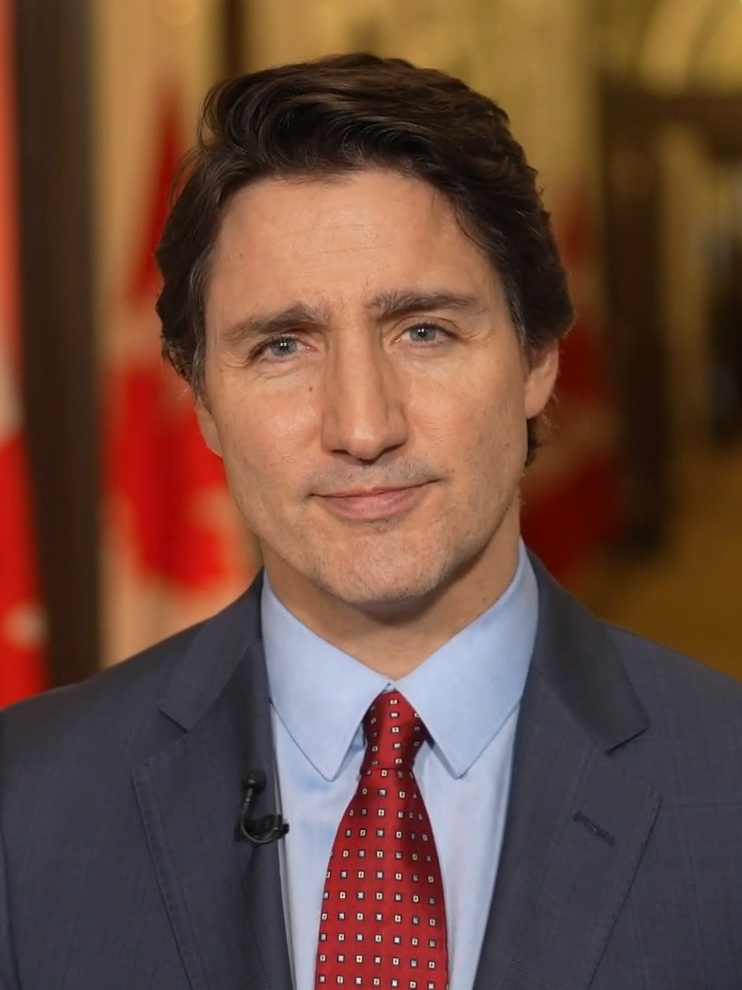
Prime Minister Trudeau, who defended the supply management system

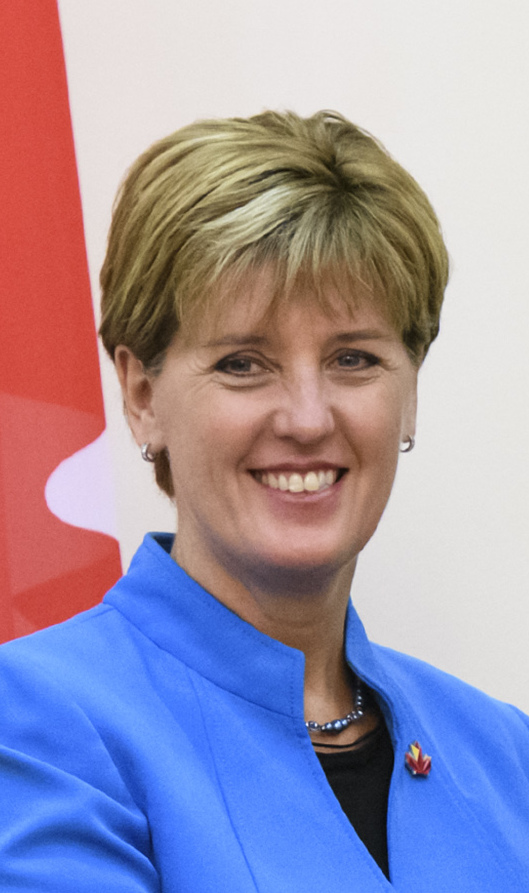
Agriculture Minister Marie-Claude Bibeau, who also defended supply management

The NAFTA agreement brought removal of tariffs on imports between Canada, the U.S., and Mexico for almost all agricultural products, but Canadian supply-managed sectors (dairy, poultry, eggs) were exempt. Very high tariffs on supply-managed goods imported into Canada were maintained (for example, 241% for liquid milk and 298% for butter), although small amounts could be imported tariff-free. Under the Canada–US–Mexico Agreement (CUSMA), the U.S. was granted tariff-free access to 3.6% of the Canadian dairy market, and there were concessions equivalent to 3.25% of the dairy market granted under Canada's entry into the Comprehensive and Progressive Agreement for Trans-Pacific Partnership (CPTPP), plus additional market access for 17,500 tons of European cheese under the CETA (the Canada-European Union trade agreement). By 2031, when the CETA, CPTPP, and CUSMA trade agreements have been fully phased in, tariff-free access for imports is estimated to be equivalent to 10% of the Canadian dairy market.

Bill C-282 (from the 44th Parliament) and Bill C-202 (from the 45th Parliament) were identical. Both were private member's bills introduced by the Bloc Québécois, so they did not represent government policy. Bill C-282's sponsor, Bloc Québécois member Luc Thériault, said that with the CETA, CPTPP, and CUSMA trade agreements, the government "really did a number" on the supply management agricultural system and food producers and processors "are still assessing the scale of the damage caused by the implementation of these three trade agreements."

In response, the Liberal government of Prime Minister Justin Trudeau said that it was fully compensating producers, including paying over $4.8 billion into the supply-managed sectors, because of negotiated access under the CETA, CPTPP, and CUSMA agreements. Also, despite initial concerns about the impact of the trade agreements, farmers in supply-managed sectors are doing well and have increased production.

Prime Minister Trudeau and Agriculture Minister Marie-Claude Bibeau reiterated the government's pledge "not to concede any further market shares under supply management during future trade negotiations". Evidence for the credibility of this commitment was provided when the U.K., Canada's third-largest trading partner, stepped away from trade negotiations in large measure over the lack of access to Canada's supply-managed markets, especially as they relate to cheese.

== Impetus for the Act ==
Lawrence Herman, an International trade lawyer with the CD Howe Institute, said parliamentarians had been subject to intense political lobbying by dairy producers, who wield outsized power in Ottawa according to Herman and others. In 2023 and 2024, there were hundreds of meetings between the Dairy Farmers of Canada and federal officials, including from the prime minister's office, dozens of federal departments and agencies, members of parliament and senators. Among the most prominent subjects discussed were international trade and Bill C-282.

Canada's lobby registry shows 141 actively registered advocates for the dairy industry (compared with 121 for pharmaceuticals), with spending of around $80 to $120 million annually. Supply management proponents pressure politicians, academics, and groups advocating for reform, and no major political party opposes the protection afforded to the sector.

== Legislative process ==
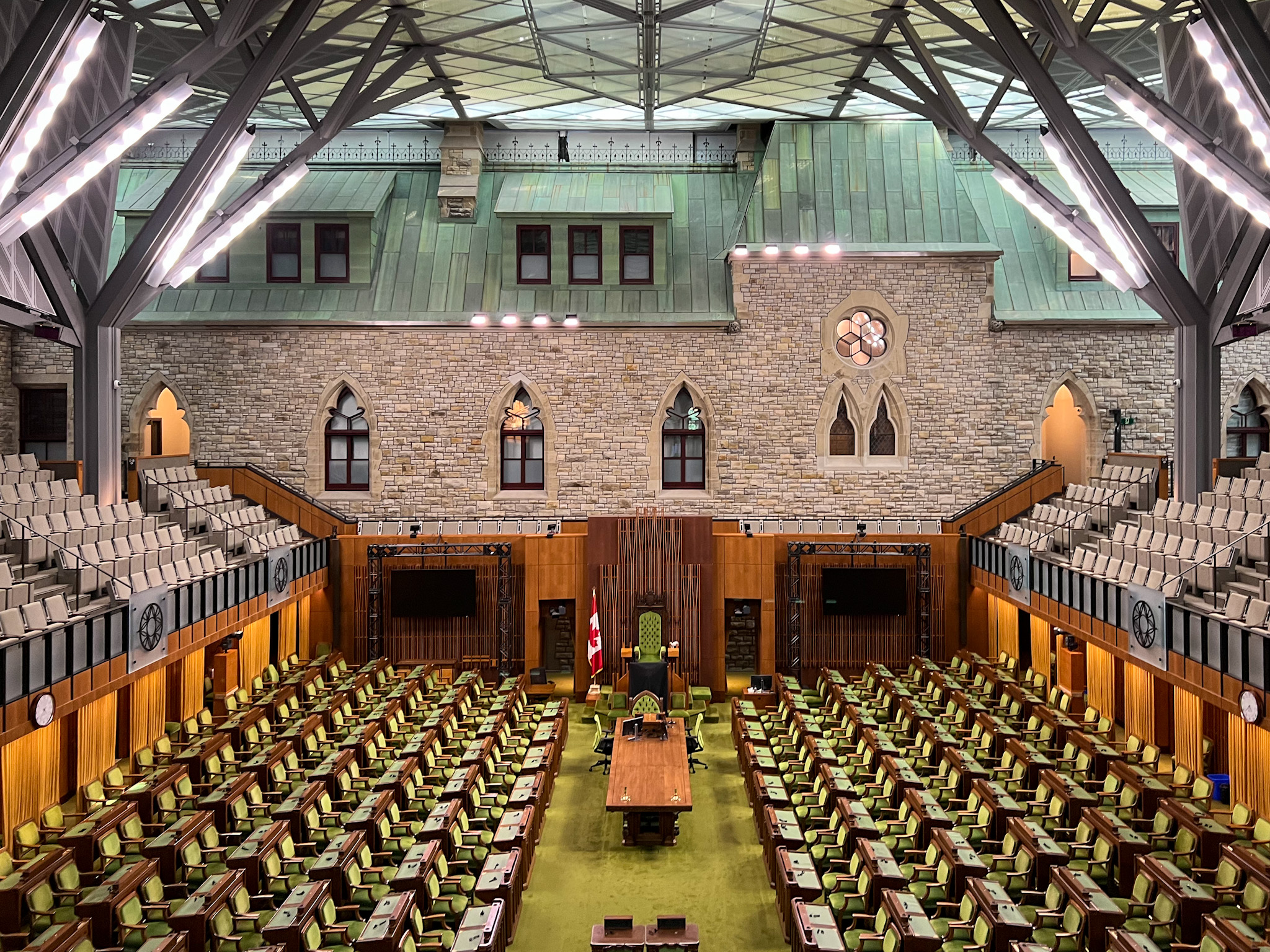
Chamber of the House of Commons, which passed both bills

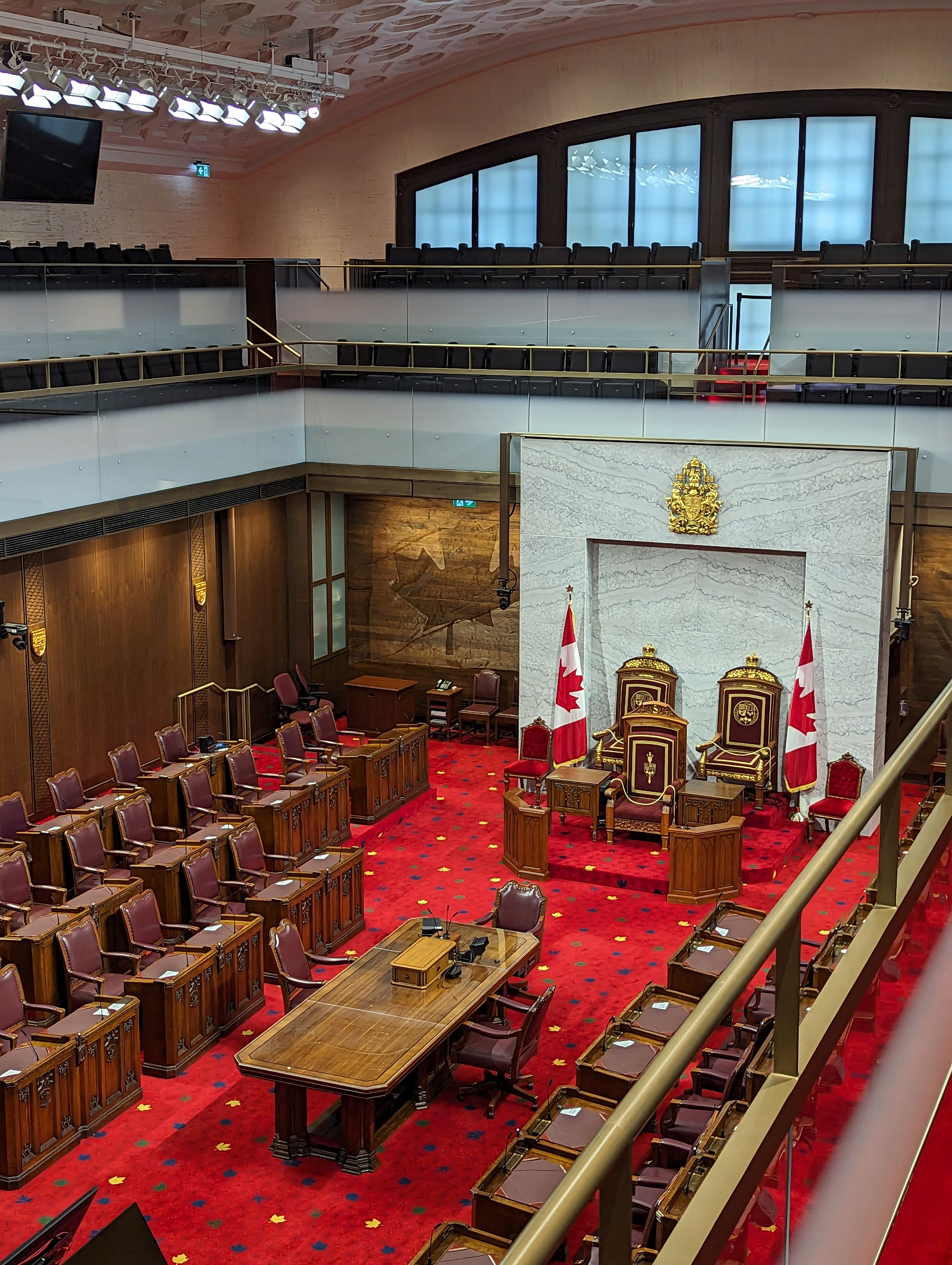
Chamber of the Senate, where an amendment was proposed in committee

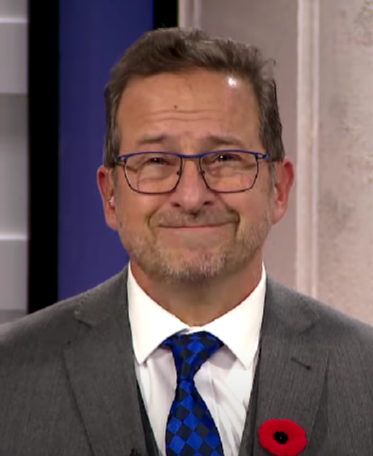
Yves-François Blanchet, leader of the Bloc Québécois, who threatened an election if the bill did not pass

Luc Thériault, the Bloc Québécois MP for Montcalm, introduced Bill C-282 in the House of Commons on 13 June 2022. Although a private member's bill, which rarely pass into law, it went through the full process in the Commons, completing second reading on 8 February 2023, committee on 15 May 2023, and third reading on 21 June 2023.

The bill then went to the Senate, receiving first reading on 21 June 2023 and second reading on 16 April 2024. During the second reading debate, Senator Peter Harder said he wanted the Senate to give adequate consideration to Bill C-282, since in his view the consideration by the House of Commons committee was farcical, with an obvious lack of trade representatives or experts speaking on the trade implications of the bill.

Bill C-282 was sent to the Senate Foreign Affairs Committee. On 7 November 2024, the senators on the committee voted 10-3 to amend the bill so that the prohibition on supply management changes would not apply to pre-existing trade agreements (such as the existing CUSMA, due for renegotiation by 2026), or to a treaty negotiation that was underway (such as Canada's ongoing talks with the U.K.). Senator Harder said this amendment would "de-risk" the bill.

The Senate committee amendment, if adopted by the full Senate, meant that Bill C-282 would likely return to the House of Commons for consideration of the amendment. In response, the Bloc Québécois stated that unless the government continued to move the bill forward in the Commons, they would bring a non-confidence vote, which could trigger an election. However, in political developments unrelated to the bill, Prime Minister Trudeau announced his resignation. Bill C-282 died on 6 January 2025 following Prime Minister Trudeau's announcement that Parliament would be prorogued, which ended the parliamentary session.

Prime Minister Mark Carney, who succeeded Trudeau in March 2025, called a federal election for 28 April 2025, which returned a Liberal minority government. On 29 May 2025, Yves-François Blanchet, the leader of the Bloc Québécois, re-introduced the proposal as Bill C-202 in the first session of the new Parliament. It passed quickly and became law on 26 June 2025.

== Responses to Bill C-202 and Bill C-282 ==
=== Response by supply-managed sectors ===
Producers in the supply-managed dairy, egg, and poultry sectors supported Bill C-202 and Bill C-282. Advocates argued the measure will provide income stability and a living wage for farmers. Activity from supply-managed farms supports rural economies. Also, the supply management system will privilege locally produced dairy, eggs, and poultry, consistent with the concept of food sovereignty.

=== Response by trade experts ===
No other country in the world has legislation that prohibits its government from including specific commodities in trade negotiations, according to the Associate Assistant Deputy Minister at the Department of Foreign Affairs, Trade and Development. Former Canadian ambassador to the World Trade Organization and chief negotiator for the NAFTA, John Weekes, said passing Bill C-282 would wave a red flag in front of the Americans ahead of the 2026 CUSMA renegotiation.

Bill C-282 would be "extremely damaging" according to a group of 19 former trade negotiators, because it handicaps Canadian governments in the give-and-take of future trade talks. They maintain that trade talks are vital to opening up new markets and securing access for Canadian products abroad and, because the bill narrows the scope of trade negotiations, it removes the flexibility needed to secure the best deals for the country as a whole.

=== Response of trading partners ===
Global Affairs Canada trade official Doug Forsyth said all of Canada's trading partners were watching the bill, and the U.S. reaction was likely to be negative. Bill C-282 could even be counterproductive for the dairy sector by making it a target of foreign negotiators. The U.S. Ambassador expressed concern about Bill C-282 because he didn't think a good way to resolve differences was for Canada to unilaterally take an issue off the table without discussing it. Senior U.S. officials have said passing such legislation could lead the U.S. to "raise the bargaining stakes" such as by demanding concessions on supply management during the 2026 mandatory review of the CUSMA.

=== Response of other industries ===
Industries that are competitive internationally, and rely on access to international markets, were most concerned about Bill C-202, and before it, Bill C-282. The Canadian Agri-Food Trade Alliance, which includes growers of cereals, pulses, beef, and canola, was "profoundly disappointed" that Bill C-282 was passed in the House of Commons. It says the legislation sets a bad protectionist precedent for a country reliant on trade. The Alliance says it is shocking how many MPs really do not know about the bill and its ramifications.

The Canadian Cattle Association opposed the bill, noting that free and open trade is instrumental to the beef industry's success, and that beef is the second largest single source of farm income in Canada. Exports support over a million agri-food jobs, and 3.3 million jobs overall in Canada, approximately ten times the 0.35 million jobs supported by supply management.

In contrast to the export-oriented industries' concerns with market access, the supply-managed dairy sector is not allowed to export much dairy product following a WTO panel ruling, because of Canada's protection of the dairy industry. Also, under the CUSMA, Canada has agreed to limit its dairy exports and, in 2023, dairy exports of $488.1 million were just 5.7% of net dairy farm cash receipts.

== Implications for supply management and future trade negotiations ==
Some opponents of the act have noted that, while it constrains the Minister of Foreign Affairs, the Government of Canada retains the power to reform supply management for domestic goals, such as consumer price reductions, or to remove interprovincial trade barriers. For example, the government could allow sales of imported cheese to consumers, rather than requiring all potential imports to go through Canadian processors. Also, Parliament could include a provision in future legislation that allows a trade deal to supersede the restrictions in the act.
