= NFRA =

NFRA may refer to:

- National Faster Rail Agency, a former Australian Government agency; absorbed into High Speed Rail Authority and Department of Infrastructure, Transport, Regional Development, Communications and the Arts
- National Financial Regulatory Administration (China)
- National Federation of Republican Assemblies
- National Financial Reporting Authority of India
- National Frozen & Refrigerated Foods Association
- National Fire and Rescue Administration
