= Apples and oranges (disambiguation) =

Apples and oranges is an idiom referring to items that cannot be compared.

Apples and oranges may also refer to:

- "Apples and Oranges" (song), a 1967 song by Pink Floyd
- Apples & Oranges, an album by Postmen
- Apples & Oranges, a 2007 album by Stacy Clark
- Apples & Oranges, a play by Alfred Uhry
- "Appels + Oranjes", a song by The Smashing Pumpkins from Adore
- Apples and Oranges, painting by Paul Cézanne

== See also ==
- Apples and Pears (disambiguation)
