= Scottish Food and Drink Fortnight =

Scottish culinary festival

The Scottish Food and Drink Fortnight is a nationwide festival in Scotland, designed to celebrate all aspects of Scottish food and drink, including its variety, producers and history. The event takes place at the start of September and is organised by Scotland Food & Drink and VisitScotland.

== Background and Participation ==
The event involves over 200 miniature events across Scotland, each designed to showcase a different aspect of Scotland's cuisine. These include food festivals, farmers' markets, street parties, celebrity cookery shows, cooking demonstrations and tasting events. Tourists and people across Scotland are encouraged to try new foods made in Scotland, find out about local Scottish producers, learn about the history of Scottish cuisine, showcase new dishes and host traditional Scottish dinners and parties to celebrate the wide variety of Scottish food available.

Examples of events held include, Jocktoberfest - an Oktoberfest style beer festival showcasing Scottish beers; the Wee G & T Festival in Perth - a festival celebrating the wide variety of Scottish gins and mixers; the Edinburgh Harvest Festival - a Harvest Festival held in the Royal Botanic Gardens in Edinburgh, to demonstrate the large selection of Scottish vegetables available.
