= Food and Drink Federation =

UK trade organisation

- Abbreviation: FDF
- Formation: 1913
- Legal status: Non-profit organisation
- Purpose: Trade body representing the UK and drink manufacturing industry
- Location: 6th Floor, 10 Bloomsbury Way, London WC1A 2SL
- Region served: UK
- Members: UK food and drink manufacturers
- Chief Executive Officer: Karen Betts
- Main organ: FDF Board
- Affiliations: FDF Scotland, FDF Cymru
- Website: http://www.fdf.org.uk

The Food and Drink Federation (FDF) is a membership organisation that represents and advises UK food and drink manufacturers.

== Membership ==
The Food and Drink Federation members are companies of all sizes as well as trade associations and groups dealing with specific sectors of the industry.

The UK food and drink industry is the largest manufacturing sector in the country. It accounts for 19% of the total manufacturing sector by turnover and employ over 400,000 people in the UK across 7,000 businesses.

== Functions ==
The Food and Drink Federation is responsible for communicating to and from a range of audiences including the UK government (particularly the Department of Health; the Department for Environment, Food and Rural Affairs; and the Department for Business, Innovation and Skills), regulators, consumers and the media.

The FDF tackles a range of issues on behalf of its members under the three core areas of health and wellbeing; food safety and science; and sustainability and competitiveness; readiness and calorific contribution; it also aims to highlight the work industry conducts under these areas. For example, its Five-fold Environmental Ambition sets out where manufacturers are looking to make a difference to the environment through reducing CO_{2} emissions; sending zero food and packaging waste to landfill from 2015; reducing the level of packaging reaching households; improving water efficiency to reduce water use; and embedding environmental standards in their transport practices to achieve fewer and friendlier food miles.

Product reformulation has also been another major focus for the Federation, highlighting the industry's ongoing work to reduce salt, trans fats, fat and sugar in food products. The industry's efforts have been supported by the UK's Food Standards Agency, the UK Government and others.

== Members ==
Selection of members:

- Apetito
- Associated British Foods
- Cargill
- Coca-Cola
- General Mills
- GlaxoSmithKline
- Kellogg's
- Mars
- McCain Foods
- Mondelez
- Nestlé
- Pepsi
- Premier Foods
- Tate & Lyle
- Unilever
- United Biscuits
- Weetabix Limited
- Wm. Wrigley Jr. Company

== Structure ==
=== Food sector groups ===
• Biscuit, Cake, Chocolate and Confectionery Group - is a member of the CAOBISCO European association • Frozen Food • Ice Cream • Meat eWG • Organic eWG • Yogurt & Chilled Dessert eWG

=== Affiliated groups ===
In the same building are the Snacks, Nuts and Crisps Manufacturers Association, the Association of Bakery Ingredient Manufacturers and the European Snacks Association.

== Scottish Food and Drink Federation ==
The organisation has a Scottish division (SFDF) that runs autonomously and is based in Edinburgh. It deals directly with the Scottish Government and is wholly responsible for the Scottish food and drink manufacturing industry, having its own Executive Committee. The drinks industry in Scotland is an important part of its economy, and its exports.

== See also ==
- European Food Safety Authority
- Food Standards Agency
- The Food Commission
- FoodDrinkEurope - food industry confederation
