= Art DeFehr =

Canadian businessman

Art DeFehr OC OM
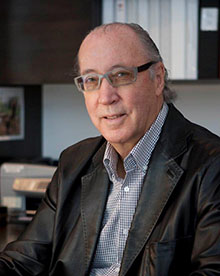
- DeFehr in 2012
- Born: Arthur DeFehr; November 10, 1942 (age 83); Winnipeg, Manitoba, Canada.
- Education: Harvard University, Goshen College, University of Manitoba
- Occupations: Business and humanitarian interests
- Known for: Business, international development initiatives, education initiatives
- Spouse: Leona DeFehr
- Children: Two
- Website: artdefehr.com

Arthur A. DeFehr OC OM (born November 10, 1942) is a Canadian businessman with investments in real estate and Palliser Furniture. He also was involved in initiating the Canadian Foodgrains Bank, LCC International University, Canadian Mennonite University, International Development Enterprises, and immigration policy including the Manitoba Provincial Nominee Program.

== Early life ==
DeFehr was born in 1942 in Winnipeg, Manitoba, Canada in a Mennonite family. Both his parents were refugees from the Soviet Union who came to Canada in the 1920s. He had a highly educated mother and a father who started a major furniture business.

== Education ==
- High school: Mennonite Brethren Collegiate
- University of Manitoba: Initial studies in science but graduated in 1964 with a Business degree. Awarded the Isbister Scholarship for academic performance.
- Goshen College: Graduated with a Bachelor of Arts in Economics.
- Harvard Business School: Graduated in 1967 with a two-year MBA. Awards included first year Baker Scholar.

== Business career ==
DeFehr returned to Winnipeg and the family business following his 1967 graduation from Harvard.. DeFehr became CEO of the family enterprises in 1984 and purchased the part of the business that became Palliser Furniture in 1996. Real estate represents his other major business interest.

== Awards ==
- Officer of the Order of Canada – 2004
- Order of Manitoba – 2011
- Honorary Doctorate of Laws – University of Manitoba 1998
- Honorary Doctorate of Laws – University College of Cape Breton – 2002
- Honorary Diploma – Red River College – 2003
- Goshen College – Alumni Award – 2011
- Entrepreneur of the Year – Manitoba Business Magazine – 2000
- Prairie Lifetime Achievement Award – Ernst and Young Entrepreneur of the Year program – 2001
- Canadian Manufacturers Hall of Fame – 2009
- Canadian Home Furnishings Alliance – Lifetime Achievement Award – 2012
- Spirit of Life Award – City of Hope (National Home Furnishings Industry Humanitarian Award)
