= Canadian Beef Check-Off Agency =

The Canadian Beef Check-Off Agency (the Agency), called the Canadian Beef Cattle Research, Market Development and Promotion Agency until 2017, administers the Canadian Beef Cattle Check-Off.

== Synopsis ==
The agency is funded by a levy on Canadian cattle sales to support research and marketing of beef products. Its activities are supervised by the Farm Products Council of Canada. It is governed by a geographically-representative 16-member Board of Directors.

The Agency funds bodies like Canada Beef and the Beef Cattle Research Council (BCRC). The BCRC listed the agency as one of the "Industry Stakeholders Represented at the BCRC Workshops" in the Canadian Beef Research and Technology Transfer Strategy 2018 - 2023 document.

A March 2015 article about the Canadian Beef Centre of Excellence noted the agency had incorporated the Beef Information Centre (BIC) and Canada Beef Export Federation (CBEF) into one big organization and given that thing the name Canada Beef.

The Agency's AGM business is hosted at the annual Canadian Beef Industry Conference, which was inaugurated in 2016 when both Rachel Notley and Justin Trudeau were in power. The 2018 CBIC was held in London, Ontario.

Cattlemen have paid the levy since April 2012. The national levy was introduced in 2012 at $1 per head of cattle, but began to increase to $2.50 per head of cattle in most provinces, starting in 2018. It is payable by producers who feed, slaughter and sell their own cattle. The CBCA flows from the Farm Products Agencies Act (R.S. 1985, c. F-4) through SOR/2002-48.

== Leadership ==
=== 2017 ===
- Linda Allison (British Columbia) chair
- Heinz Reimer (Manitoba) vice-chair

=== 2018 ===
- Heinz Reimer (Manitoba) chair.
- Chad Ross (Saskatchewan) vice-chair

=== 2023 ===
- Jeff Smith (Alberta) chair.
- Trevor Welch (New Brunswick) vice-chair

== See also ==
- Canadian import duties
- List of food industry trade associations
