= Canadian Meat Council =

Canadian trade association

The Canadian Meat Council is Canada's national trade association for the federally inspected meat packers and processors. It is an industry trade group associated with the meat packing industry. Federally inspected plants account for over 90% of all the meat processed in Canada.

As a key component of Canada's agriculture sector, the meat industry is the largest contributor to Canada's food processing industry, employing almost 70,000 Canadians and representing 12% of Canada's agri-food exports. It is also one of Canada's leading manufacturing sectors with annual sales of over $24 billion.

== History ==
A group of Ontario meat packers met in Toronto in August, 1919 to decide if an association was needed to represent the industry which underwent tremendous growth during and after World War I. With overwhelming support for the idea, Samuel E. "Sam" Todd was appointed to head the Council (then called "The Industrial and Development Council of Canadian Meat Packers") on September 1, 1919. J. S. McLean was elected as the first president of the Council. E. B. Roberts, a journalist by profession, was hired by the beginning of 1920 to take care of the Council's media and public relations.

The first office of the organization was located at 186 King St. W., Toronto. Membership included Harris Abattoir Ltd., William Davies Co. Ltd., Swift Canadian Co. Ltd., Gunns Ltd., Canadian Packing Co Ltd., Puddys Ltd., F. W. Fearman Co., Ingersoll Packaging Co. Ltd., Whyte Packing Co. Ltd., Gallagher-Holman and Lafrance Co. Ltd., Gordon-Ironside & Fares Packers Ltd., Wilson Canadian Co. Ltd., and Armour and Company.

=== Meat Packers Council of Canada ===
The Industrial and Development Council of Canadian Meat Packers was considered a lengthy name by many members, and an alternate name, "Meat Packers Council of Canada," was proposed. It was not until Sam Todd retired in 1952 that the name was officially changed to Meat Packers Council of Canada.

The council was "incorporated" as an association in 1961 after serving as a voluntary, unincorporated association for nearly 40 years.

=== Canadian Meat Council ===
In 1980, the association changed its name to the Canadian Meat Council (Conseil des Viandes du Canada) during the second Presidency of ALLAN K. BESWICK.

=== COVID-19 and Centennial year ===
During the COVID-19 pandemic, which happened during the centennial year of the Council, more than 50 "regular members" had paid their dues, including a lamb trade group from New Zealand as well as Cargill, JBS Foods International and the Ministry of Agriculture and Forestry of Alberta.

The Executive Members of the Council at the time were:

- David Colwell (Chair) JBS Foods Canada
- Troy Warren (Past Chair) Sure Good Foods
- Iain Stewart (Vice-Chair) Maple Leaf Foods
- Matt Gibney (Secretary) Cargill Foods Limited
- David Flomen (Treasurer) Viscofan Canada

== Publications ==
- Two booklets, Canadian Livestock Future and Better Livestock - The Nation's Welfare were published in the early 1920s.
- A monthly series called " A letter on Canadian Livestock Products" was published since 1921.
- Three editions of Food Service Meat Manual were published so far. The Third Edition is available currently from the Council.
- A series of position papers on issues facing the Canadian Meat Industry are available only for the members of the Council.
- Proceedings of the Technical Symposium of the Canadian Meat Science Association.

== Events ==
Annual Meetings are held every year since 1919. The meetings are one of the largest gathering of the Canadian Meat Industry's decision makers. Symposium and workshops on technical areas are held on need basis.

== See also ==
- North American Meat Processors Association
- American Meat Institute
- List of food industry trade associations
