= North American Meat Institute =

Meat Institute
- Formation: 2015; 11 years ago
- Merger of: American Meat Institute; North American Meat Association
- Type: Trade association
- Tax ID no.: 90-0811732
- Website: meatinstitute.org
- Formerly called: North American Meat Institute

The Meat Institute (formerly the North American Meat Institute) is a non-profit, industry trade association formed in 2015 from the merger of the American Meat Institute (AMI) and the North American Meat Association (NAMA). It is headquartered in metropolitan Washington, DC.

== History ==
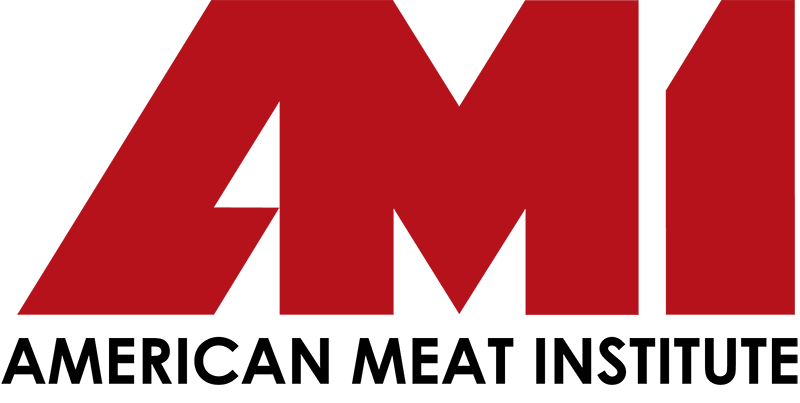
Logo of the American Meat Institute

The Meat Institute was formed with the merger of the American Meat Institute and North American Meat Association in 2015. The origins of the association date back to the passage of the Federal Meat Inspection Act in 1906, one of the first U.S. laws to set federal food processing standards. The American Meat Packers Association was founded in Chicago shortly thereafter to assist meat packers in complying with the new law. Its name was changed to the American Meat Institute in 1940. In 1979, AMI moved from Chicago to Washington, DC to be closer to the federal government while regulatory and legislative affairs dominated the institute's agenda. In 2024, the name was shortened to Meat Institute from North American Meat Institute as part of a rebrand.

Logo of the National Meat Association.

NAMA formed in 2012 from the merger of the National Meat Association (NMA) and the North American Meat Processors (NAMP). NAMA was headquartered in Oakland, California. NMA was formed by the merger of Pacific Coast Meat Association, itself formed in 1948, and Western States Meat Packers Association which had launched in 1946 in San Francisco, California. NMA was once known as Western States Meat Association, but had since grown to national prominence with approximately 500 member companies. It had a biennial trade show called MEATXPO.

=== COVID-19 pandemic ===
During the coronavirus pandemic, the Meat Institute wrote a draft of an executive order for President Donald Trump to keep meat plants open during the pandemic. After receiving the draft, Trump issued an executive order which had similarities to the Meat Institute draft. The executive order was controversial, with labor unions criticizing it as putting the profits of the meat companies ahead of the safety of workers.

=== Climate change ===
Though the organization acknowledges the existence of climate change, it often makes claims about animal agriculture and meat that contradict the consensus science about the role of livestock production in greenhouse gas emissions and biodiversity loss.

== Organizational structure ==
The Meat Institute is governed by elected leaders and staffed by 35 professionals. The Meat Institute elected leaders include five officers plus the president and CEO, as well as a 91-person board of directors and a 20-person executive committee.

The current officers are as follows:

1. Meat Institute president and CEO: Julie Anna Potts
2. Chairman: Eric Gustafson, Coast Packing Company
3. Vice Chairman: James Snee, Hormel Foods Corporation
4. Treasurer: Peter Bozzo, Michael’s Finer Meats & Seafoods
5. Secretary: Randy Huffman, Maple Leaf Foods
6. Immediate Past Chairman: Steve Van Lannen, American Foods Group, LLC

== See also ==
- Poultry farming in the United States
- Canadian Meat Council
- New Zealand Meat Producers Board
- Meat Industry Association of New Zealand
