= Worshipful Company of Fruiterers =

Livery company of the City of London

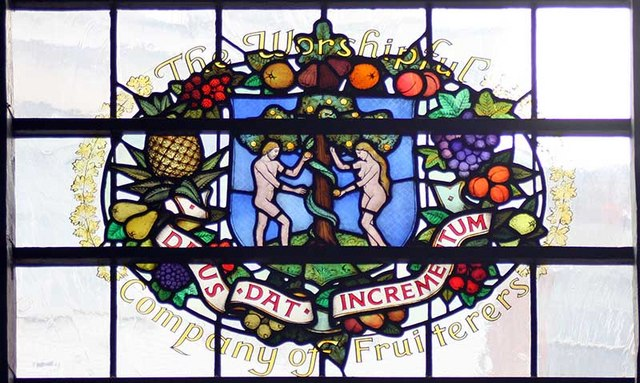
Arms of the Worshipful Company of Fruiterers in St Mary Abchurch

The Worshipful Company of Fruiterers is a livery company of the city of London originally and presently concerned with the fruit trade, and a charitable institution.

== History ==
The Company was founded in 1463 and received a Royal Charter in 1605. As a guild it was concerned with the sale and quality of fruit brought into London, training apprentices, supporting its members and doing charitable works. The connection of the Company to the fruit trade had diminished by the late nineteenth century, but in the later twentieth century its connections were revitalized. It is known for its special recognition of individuals in the fruit industry and for its support of related research and development. Currently, over half the livery is made up of industry representatives.

== The Awards Council ==
The Awards Council was founded in 1931 as a sub-committee reporting directly to the Company's Court of Assistants. The awards focus on matters relating to fruit culture.

- The triennial awards:
  - Ridley Medal for outstanding achievements in fruit culture
  - Lewis Award for outstanding achievements in the marketing of fruit
  - Matthew Mack Award for outstanding achievements in training within the industry
- The annual awards:
  - Fruit Culture Award (awarded annually at the National Fruit Show)
  - Fruiterers' Management Award (awarded annually at the Company's Dinner in November)

The Awards Council also makes an annual presentation of fruit to the Lord Mayor of London, organises the annual City Food Lecture in Guildhall (established in 2000), awards prizes at the Cherry and Soft Fruit Show and National Fruit Show, and supports scholarships and research.

== Order of precedence ==
The Company ranks forty-fifth in the order of precedence of Livery Companies. Its motto is Deus Dat Incrementum, Latin for God Gives the Increase.

== See also ==
- British Apples and Pears
