= Still Life with Apples and Oranges =

Painting by Paul Cézanne

Apples and Oranges
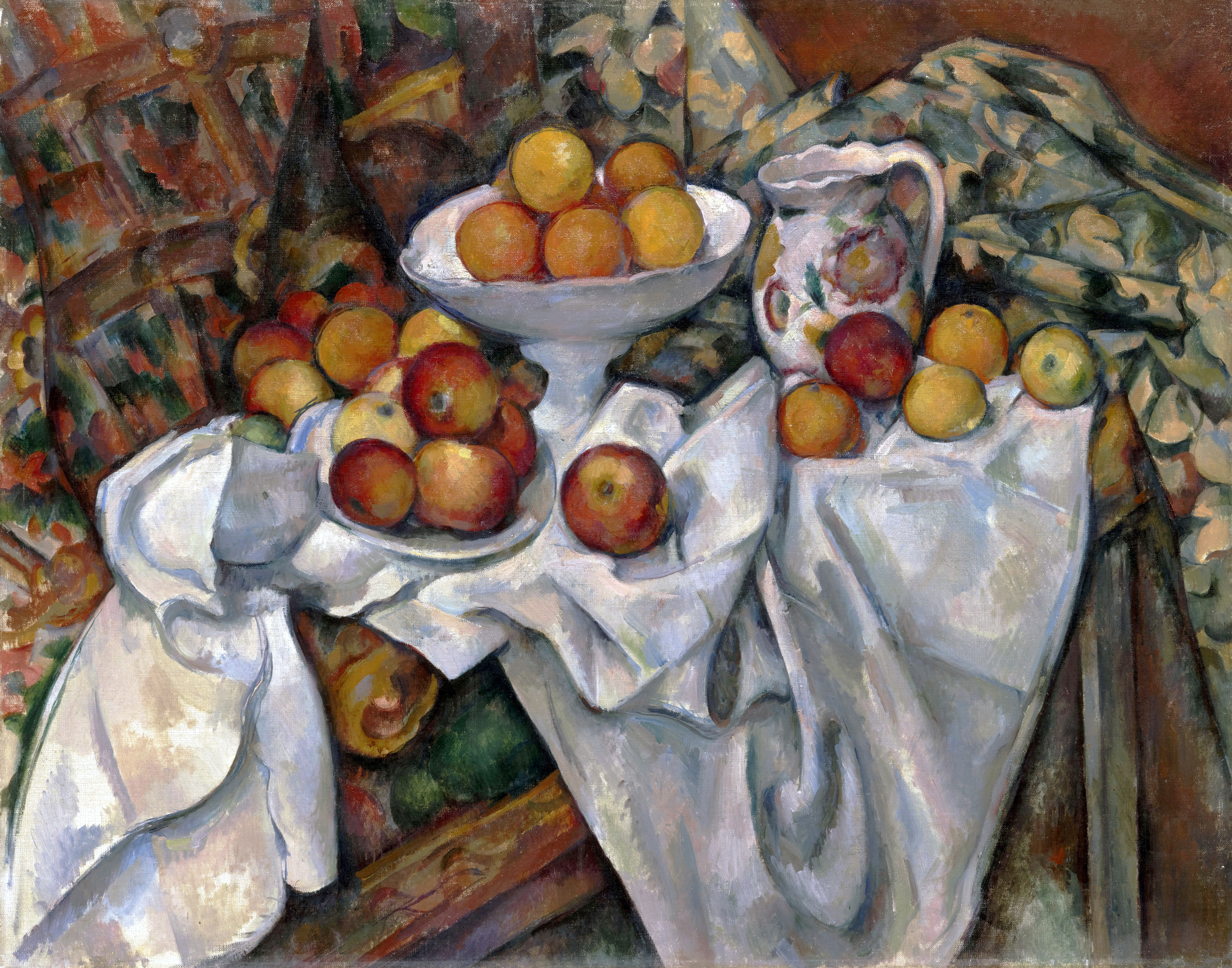
- Artist: Paul Cézanne
- Year: c. 1899
- Dimensions: 74 cm × 93 cm (29 in × 37 in)
- Location: Musée d'Orsay, Paris

Still Life with Apples and Oranges (French: Nature morte aux pommes et aux oranges) is a still-life oil painting dating from c. 1899 by the French artist Paul Cézanne. It is currently housed at the Musée d'Orsay in Paris.

This canvas was inspired by Still Life with Curtain and Flowered Pitcher, painted a few months earlier with the same objects and now kept at the Hermitage Museum in St. Petersburg.

== History ==
The painting was first owned by the art critic Gustave Geffroy who sold it in January 1907 to the art gallery Bernheim-Jeune. Count Isaac de Camondo acquired it in May of the same year and bequeathed it to the Louvre Museum the following year, in 1908. It then became part of the collection of the Musée d'Orsay when created.

== Legacy ==
In 1983, as part of a group exhibition organized by the art critic Jean-Luc Chalumeau, where artists were invited to reveal their pictorial references, the painter Herman Braun-Vega created a painting entitled Caramba! in which the central still life is the result of the fusion of Picasso’s La casserole émaillée with Cézanne’s Pommes et oranges.

== See also ==
- List of paintings by Paul Cézanne
