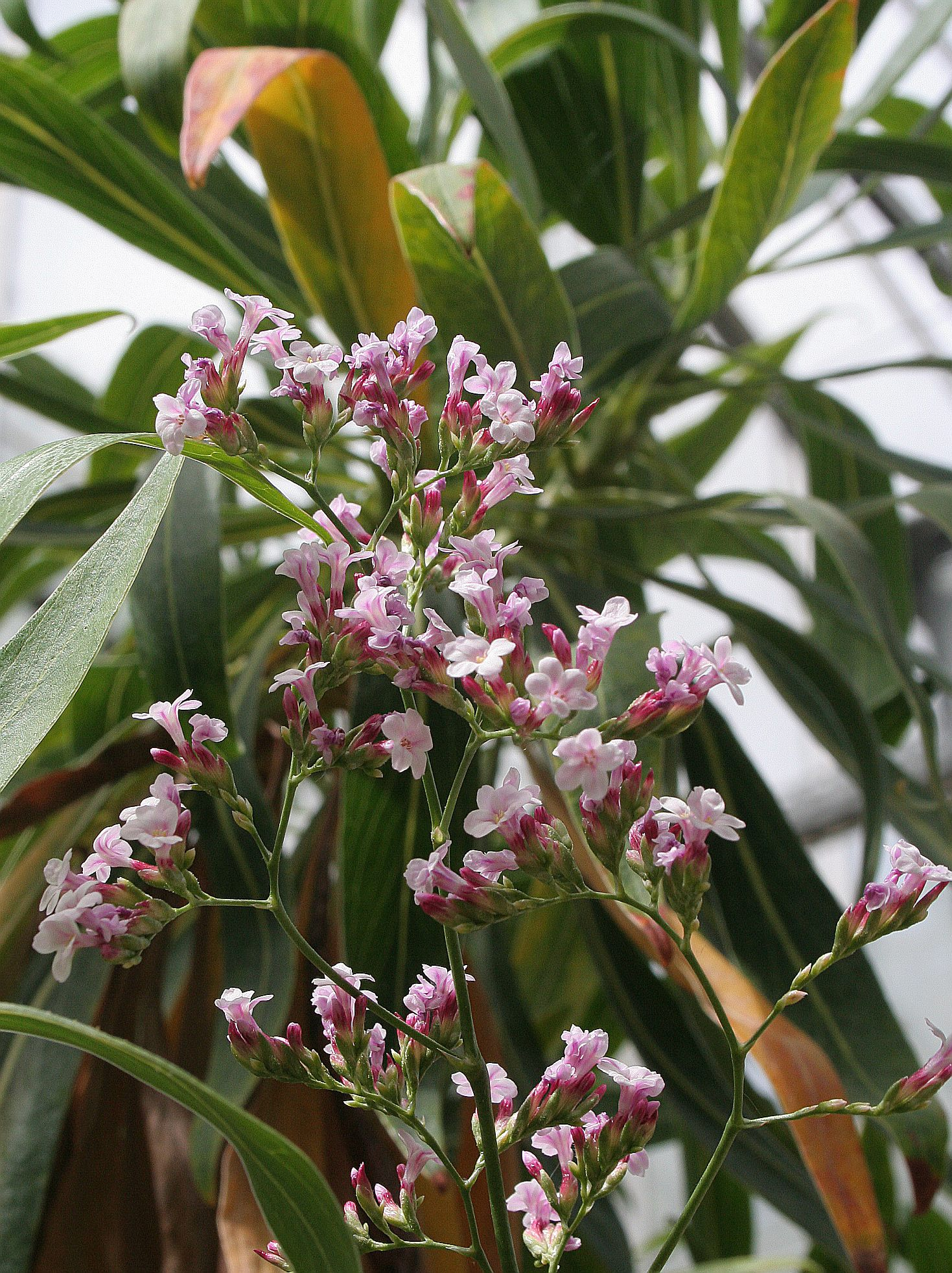
- Flowers
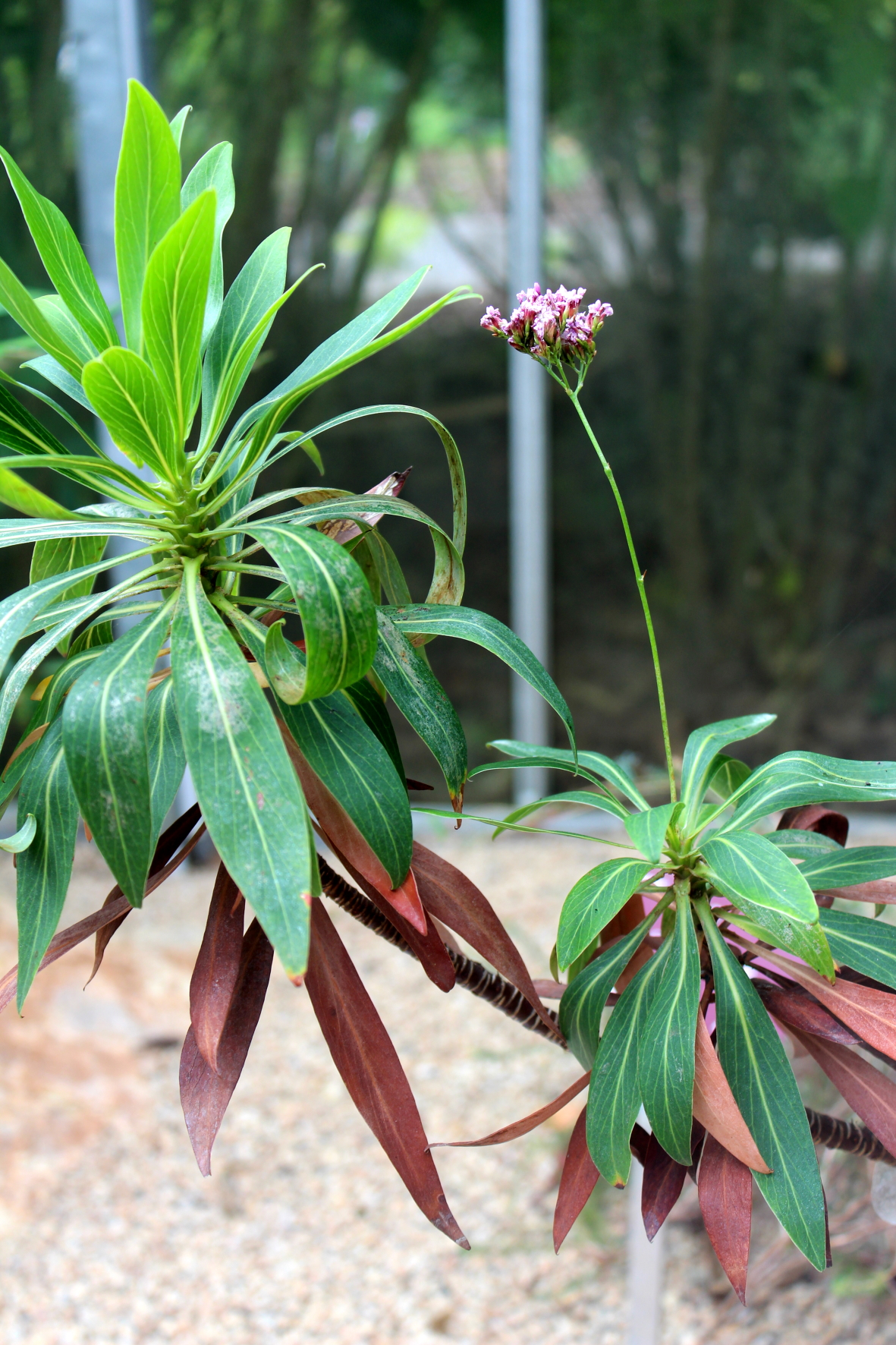
- Growth form is tree-like

Conservation status
- Critically Endangered (IUCN 3.1)

Scientific classification
- Kingdom: Plantae
- Clade: Tracheophytes
- Clade: Angiosperms
- Clade: Eudicots
- Order: Caryophyllales
- Family: Plumbaginaceae
- Genus: Limonium
- Species: L. dendroides

Binomial name
- Limonium dendroides Svent.

= Limonium dendroides =

Species of plant

Limonium dendroides is a species of flowering plant in the family Plumbaginaceae, native to La Gomera in the Canary Islands. There are fewer than 40 mature individuals remaining in the wild, with the number decreasing.
