= Food Federation Germany =

- Formation: 1955
- Legal status: Non-profit organisation
- Purpose: Trade body representing the German food sector from farm to fork
- Location(s): Claire-Waldoff-Straße 7, 10117 Berlin, Germany; Avenue des Nerviens, 9-31, 1040 Brussels, Belgium
- Region served: Germany
- Members: German food trade associations, German food businesses, laboratories, law firms, individual members
- President: René Püchner
- Main organ: Board
- Website: Food Federation Germany

Food Federation Germany (German: Lebensmittelverband Deutschland) is the leading association of the German food sector, representing the food value chain in Germany from farm to fork, i.e., from agriculture, food manufacturing, food craft and food retail to gastronomy. The association operates offices in Berlin, Germany, as well as Brussels, Belgium.

== Membership ==
The association's membership includes some 70 associations, 250 companies – ranging from mid-sized firms to international corporations –, as well as 150 organizational and individual members.

The association itself is a member of the European food industry body FoodDrinkEurope as well as of European Movement Germany.

== History ==
Former logo until 2019 (Federation for Food Law and Food Science)

Food Federation Germany was founded on March 10, 1955 in Nuremberg, Germany, under the name Federation for Food Law and Food Science (German: Bund für Lebensmittelrecht und Lebensmittelkunde, abbreviated BLL) as a re-establishment of the Federation of German Food Manufacturers and Traders (German: Bund Deutscher Nahrungsmittel-Fabrikanten und -Händler) that had been active from 1901 to 1945. In May 2019, the association's general meeting voted for changing the association's name to Food Federation Germany (German: Lebensmittelverband Deutschland). The name change came into force in July 2019, followed by a rebranding process that was awarded a Rebrand 100: merit at the 2020 Rebrand 100 Global Awards.
