= American Meat Institute =

Former trade association representing the U.S. meat and poultry industry

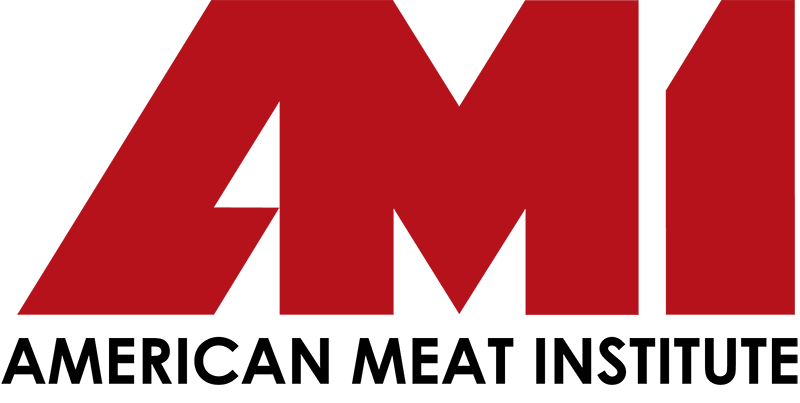
- Logo of the American Meat Institute
- Abbreviation: AMI
- Merged into: North American Meat Institute
- Formation: 1906; 120 years ago
- Founded at: Chicago, Illinois
- Dissolved: 2015; 11 years ago
- Type: Trade association
- Tax ID no.: 36-1263180
- Subsidiaries: National Hot Dog and Sausage Council
- Formerly called: American Meat Packers Association; Institute of American Meat Packers

The American Meat Institute (AMI) was the oldest and largest trade association representing the U.S. meat and poultry industry. In 2015, it was merged into the North American Meat Institute (NAMI).

== Overview ==
Founded in 1906 in Chicago as the American Meat Packers Association, the American Meat Institute is a trade association that provides leadership to advance the interests of America’s meat and poultry packing and processing companies, and the 526,000 workers they employ, before government, media, and the public. In 1919, the organization was known as the Institute of American Meat Packers and was renamed American Meat Institute in 1940.

The organization was created shortly after the passage of the Federal Meat Inspection Act and spent much its early years helping meat packers adjust to new inspection requirements. AMI moved its headquarters in 1979 to Washington, DC, where it remains today.

AMI’s membership ranged from large, publicly traded companies that employ thousands to small businesses. More than half of AMI’s members were small, family-owned businesses employing fewer than 100 individuals and one-third employ less than 50. Collectively, AMI’s 200 member companies produced 90% of the beef, pork, veal and lamb food products and 75% of the turkey food products in the U.S.

In addition to advocating before government, media and the public, AMI also provided programs, services, expositions and educational seminars to benefit its members. Through the American Meat Institute Foundation, which was originally created in 1944, AMI conducted scientific research designed to help meat and poultry companies improve their plants and their products.

=== National Hot Dog and Sausage Council ===
The National Hot Dog and Sausage Council was founded in 1994 by the American Meat Institute and is headquartered in Washington, D.C. It is an American trade association that promotes the hot dog and sausage industry.

== Organizational structure ==
AMI was governed by elected leaders and staffed by 32 professionals. AMI elected leaders include five officers plus the president and CEO, as well as a 70-person board of directors and a 23-person executive committee. Representatives on both of these bodies included leaders in both the supplier and packer/processor segments of the industry. AMI had also created operating groups, called policy committees and advisory committees, within its membership to allow member companies to recommend AMI policies in their primary areas of interest.

== Events ==
AMI and the AMI Foundation sponsored annual education conferences, topical workshops, award programs, committee meetings and an annual trade show.

The annual trade show, the 2012 AMI Expo, took place May 1–3, 2012 in Dallas, Texas. The 2012 AMI Expo was co-located with the Food Marketing Institute 2012 Show, United Fresh Produce Association's United Fresh and the U.S. Food Showcase, bringing together almost 1,200 exhibitors and 25,000 attendees in Dallas. Processors from all over the world will convene to see and discuss the latest technology innovations in packaging, processing equipment, ingredients and services that are changing the meat and poultry industry.

Several of the AMI Foundation's education conferences have included: the Animal Care and Handling Conference, October 19–20, 2011 in Kansas City, Missouri; the Meat and Poultry Research Conference, November 1–2, 2011 in Kansas City, Missouri; the Annual Meat Conference, February 19–21, 2012 in Orlando, Florida; and the Worker Safety, Human Resources & the Environment Conference, March 14–15, 2012 in Kansas City, Missouri.

There are annual education conferences, topical workshops, award programs, committee meetings and annual trade shows. Every event was a conglomeration of thought aimed at creating opportunities for various industry processors, suppliers and press to learn, network and find solutions to various problem. Other events included: the International Production in Atlanta, GA | January 27–29, 2015, the Environmental Conferences Atlanta, GA | January 26–27, 2015, the Annual Meat Conference in Nashville, TN | February 22–24, 2015, the Worker Safety and Human Resources Conference in Kansas City, KS | April 22–23, 2015 and lastly the Animal Care and Handling Conference in Kansas City, MO | October 15–16, 2015.

The Worldwide Food Expo is a biannual event.

== AMI Foundation funded research ==
The AMI Foundation was renamed to be the Foundation for Meat and Poultry Research and Education (Foundation) in 2016. It provides research funding to universities, private institutions, non-profit organizations and other foundations to conduct research to enable the meat and poultry industry to produce better, safer products and to operate more efficiently. The Foundation publicly disseminates research findings, best practices and other educational materials on a broad range of food safety, worker safety, nutrition and consumer information projects.

Since 1999, the AMI Foundation research program has directly sponsored food safety research projects at leading universities and research labs totaling more than $8 million.

A list of Foundation completed research projects on the subjects of:

- E.coli O157:H7
- Non O157 Shiga toxin-producing E. coli
- Listeria monocytogenes
- Salmonella
- Campylobacter
- Diet and Health
- Sodium Nitrite
- Other Food Safety
