= Lead Association for Caterers in Education =

Trade association in the UK

The LACA, the school food people is the professional body representing over 1000 catering managers and suppliers who provide catering services to all sectors of Local Authorities in England, Wales and Scotland. Local authority caterers are responsible for providing more than 2.5 million school meals a day, civic catering such as town halls and leisure centres, for social services catering such as residential homes for the elderly, day centres and meals on wheels.

LACA organises National School Meals Week (NSMW). This takes place in the second week of November each year and encourages all local authorities to "Get Involved" in promoting healthy school meals to parents, pupils and teachers. LACA is a partner of Change4Life and also works closely with the School Food Trust. LACA organises an annual conference and the School Chef of the Year. This is a cookery competition for school caterers to produce a healthy, two-course meal for an 11-year-old. LACA has a number of working parties including: Membership; Events: and Communications.

Members of LACA are organised into geographical regions, these elect a committee to organise events and meetings throughout the year. The purpose of these meetings is to: encourage local networking; learn and share best practice; and encourage continual professional development. Each region of LACA elects a member to serve on the board of LACA Ltd.

Since inception in 1989, LACA has set out to inform, develop, represent and support its members through a range of initiatives and services. The Association became a Company Limited by Guarantee in 2009.
