= Freshfel Europe =

- Type: Advocacy group
- Industry: Fresh Produce
- Founded: 2001
- Headquarters: Brussels, Belgium
- Website: http://www.freshfel.org

Freshfel Europe, the European Fresh Produce Association, is the forum for the fresh fruit and vegetables supply chain in Europe and beyond and a non-profit association. Its members and associated members are associations and companies that have an interest in the European fresh fruit and vegetable sector, including all segments of the supply chain such as production, trade, logistics and retailing. The association was created in 2001 on the roots of 40 years of experience of EUCOFEL (European Fruit and Vegetable Trade Association) and CIMO (Confederation of Importers of Overseas Fruits and Vegetables). The association is based in Brussels with registered Article of Association with the Belgian Ministry of Justice. Besides its representation-/lobby-activities, summed up in an annual report, Freshfel publishes once a year the “Consumption Monitor”, is the creator of the “Fresh Quality” website (a guide to EU fresh produce law) and is the co-organiser of the fresh produce business conference “Fresh”, a joint conference of Freshfel and the Eurofruit Magazine.

== Functions ==
Freshfel is a member-driven association, undertaking multiple representation and the coordination of tasks for the overall benefit of the fresh produce sector. Freshfel defends the interests of the sector on the European and international scene, and updates members on recent legislative and supply chain developments. Freshfel provides a networking platform for its members and facilitates contacts among representatives of the sector.

Freshfel's mission aims to: • improve the efficiency and competitiveness of the sector
• facilitate international fresh produce trade
• assist members to comply with the highest safety rules
• securing a favourable environment to promote the benefits of fresh produce
• positioning the sector in the new research and innovation policy
• stimulating the consumption of fresh fruit and vegetables

The Annual General Meeting (AGM) of Freshfel in Brussels, Belgium, was on 19 June 2012 and set the priorities for the upcoming months.

== Membership ==
Freshfel Europe incorporates over 200 companies and national associations of producers, importers, shippers and exporters, distributors, wholesalers, retailers and their service providers such as logistics and reefer transportation, as well as seed companies and crop protection companies. Members and associated members are both from within the EU and in countries with an interest in the European fruit and vegetables market.

== Structure ==
Freshfel Europe is structured around a Board which is enhanced by several Divisions and Committees with dedicated missions. The Board consists of the Association's President, vice-president and the Treasurer. Each of the Divisions (Import; Export; Production; Wholesale and Distribution, and Retail) and Committees (Food Safety and Sustainability; Promotion and Communication, Convenience, Bananas, and Citrus) is having one chairman and one vice-chairman. All Board members are elected for a mandate period of two years.

The Board was renewed by the 2012 AGM which took place in Brussels (Belgium) on 19 June 2012 for the 2012/2014 term of activities. Besides the Board assignments which are ad personam, Freshfel operates in an open manner, inviting all its members and associated members to attend the regular meetings organised by the Association on topical and emerging issues.

== Consumption Monitor ==
The ‘Consumption Monitor’ was developed by the Freshfel Working Group on Promotion, Communication and Image and analyses each year the trends in the production, trade and supply of fresh fruits and vegetables across the EU-27, as well as consumption information in Norway, Switzerland and the USA. The study is part of the actions undertaken by Freshfel in the framework of the EU Platform for Action on Diet, Physical Activity and Health.

== Enjoy Fresh ==
Building on efforts to spread the word to ‘Enjoy Fresh’ and to enhance the image of fresh fruit and vegetables, Freshfel has conducted in the first half of 2011 a media campaign to highlight the value of fresh produce. In the course of these activities the association has launched in February the so-called ‘Enjoy Fresh’ website. It is the first pan-European website to highlight the positive features of fresh produce and tries to raise the awareness about the values and benefits fresh produce provides to consumers. The website provides information on the production and sustainability aspects of fruit and vegetables, on what is being done to ensure a 'quality' product, information on the nutrition and health benefits, statistical facts, and also tips on how to prepare / consume fresh produce.

In continuing to build up the ‘Enjoy Fresh’ concept on a European level, Freshfel launched in the course of another media campaign in the first half of 2012 in June a public website designed for kids, parents and teachers, called ‘Kids Enjoy Fresh’. It is supposed to bring fresh produce closer to kids and assist parents and teachers in this task.
