= Bread Bakers Guild of America =

The Bread Bakers Guild of America is a non-profit alliance of professional bakers, farmers, millers, suppliers, educators, students, home bakers, technical experts, bakery owners, and managers. Founded in 1993 by Pittsburgh bakery owner, Thomas McMahon, the guild is now based in Sonoma, California, and has a diverse membership from across the United States and around the world.

== Mission ==
The primary mission of the guild is to help advance the baking profession by serving as an educational resource to the industry and its professionals. They provide educational resources to artisan bakers, help the community grow, define professional standards, and "celebrate the craft and the passion of the artisan baker."

== Activities ==
Besides holding bread baking classes, other regional events, and publishing a quarterly newsletter, The Bread Bakers Guild of America also sponsors Bread Bakers Guild Team USA, which has competed in every Coupe du Monde de la Boulangerie since 1994. Bread Bakers Guild Team USA won a gold medal in the Baguette and Specialty Breads category and overall medals in 1999 (gold), 2002 (silver), and 2005 (gold).
