= Ronald Hatton =

English horticulturist (1886–1965)

Sir Ronald Hatton
- Portrait by Walter Stoneman, 1945
- Born: Ronald George Hatton; 6 July 1886; Kilburn, London
- Died: 11 November 1965 (aged 79); Benenden, Kent
- Occupations: pomologist horticulturalist
- Known for: Malling series

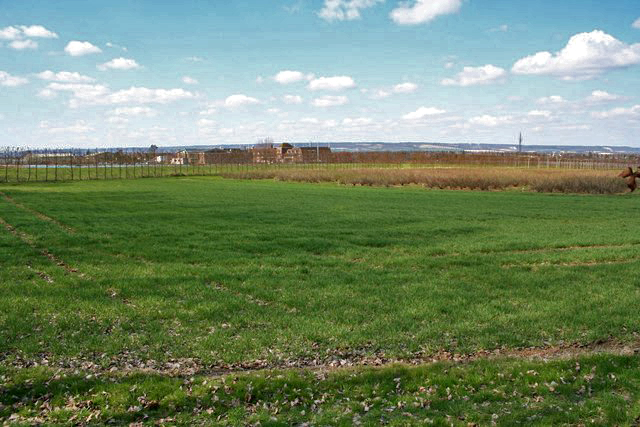
The East Malling Research Station, where Hatton spent his working life

Sir Ronald George Hatton, CBE FRS (6 July 1886 – 11 November 1965) was a British horticulturalist and pomologist.

== Life ==
Hatton was born in Kilburn, London. His father Ernest Hatton was a barrister, and his maternal grandfather William Pearson a KC; his mother Amy was the sister of the biometrician Karl Pearson. Hatton attended Brighton College and later Exeter School, and in 1906 went up to Balliol College, Oxford, to read history; he took a fourth in 1910, and his BA in 1912. He went to work as a farm labourer, and in 1913 published a book, Folk of the Furrow, written under the pen name "Christopher Holdenby". From 1912 he studied agriculture at the South-Eastern Agricultural College at Wye in Kent. In 1914 the Fruit Experimental Station of the college became the East Malling Research Station; when the director left for the First World War, Hatton became acting director. He was made director in 1918.

In 1914 Hatton married Hannah Rachel Rigden, who was from Ashford. In 1922 they had a son, Christopher, who became a monk.

Hatton retired from the East Malling centre in 1949. He died on 11 November 1965 at his home in Benenden, in Kent. He was buried in the churchyard at East Malling, not far from the research station estate.

== Work ==
Hatton was director at East Malling for thirty years. During that time he greatly expanded both its size and its range of activities. His principal achievement was the rationalisation, standardisation and classification of rootstocks for fruit trees. His work led to the establishment first of the Malling series, and later, in collaboration with the John Innes Horticultural Institution, of the Malling-Merton rootstocks for apples.

== Recognition ==
Hatton received the Victoria Medal of the Royal Horticultural Society in 1930. He was made a CBE in 1934, was elected a Fellow of the Royal Society in 1944, and was knighted in 1949.
