= Canadian Pork Council =

The Canadian Pork Council is a Canadian national trade association for the hog producers of the country. It is an industry trade group associated with the pork industry. The CPC represents over 7,000 farms in nine provinces.

== History ==
In 1966, hog producers in Canada formed the Canadian Swine Council for the purpose of negotiating and developing a new pork grading system.

It was later renamed as the title reads.

The Council serves members "through its national and international policy advocacy efforts, as well as through the development and implementation of initiatives dealing with food safety, animal care, traceability, animal health, environmental management, international trade and nutrition."

During the COVID-19 pandemic, hog producers were unhappy due to closed slaughterhouses and closed restaurants, and lost money on every animal they sold. Human cases of COVID-19 disease "at American pork-processing plants, including in South Dakota and Iowa, have temporarily closed facilities and slashed the number of hogs being processed every day by an estimated 60,000." A finishing pig that commanded $180 in January 2020 is now worth around $130. The producers want reinstated the federal government subsidy called the "set-aside program, which compensates producers for feeding the animals they hold back (from the slaughterhouses) a maintenance diet. The program was first implemented during the BSE crisis" of 25 years before.

== See also ==
- List of food industry trade associations
