= National Yogurt Association =

Former US trade organization

The National Yogurt Association (NYA) was a non-profit trade organization in the United States that represented the manufacturers and marketers of live and active culture yogurt products as well as suppliers to the yogurt industry.

== Dissolution ==
In December 2018, the NYA board of directors voted to dissolve into the International Dairy Foods Association on January 10, 2019. However, the NYA website would stay up until around February 19, 2019.
