= Grain and Feed Trade Association =

The Grain and Feed Trade Association Ltd. Registered in England & Wales
- Formation: November 17, 1871 (under GAFTA = 1971)
- Legal status: Trade Association
- Headquarters: London, WC2; United Kingdom
- Location: London, Beijing, Geneva, Kyiv, Singapore
- Services: Contracts, Arbitration, Gafta Trade Assurance Scheme (GTAS), Trade Policy, Education and Training, Events
- Members: Over 1950 Members in 94 countries
- President: Gavin Millar
- Director General: Jaine Chisholm Caunt OBE
- Website: www.gafta.com

The Grain and Feed Trade Association (GAFTA) is an international, London-based trade association consisting of traders, brokers, superintendents, analysts, fumigators, arbitrators and other professionals in the international grain trade.

== History and development ==
GAFTA can trace its origins back to 1878, when the London Corn Trade Association (LCTA) was established by members of the corn trade to protect their interests. The LCTA sought to achieve this through the adoption of standard forms of contract, drawn up by the association, with any disputes arising out of these contracts being settled by arbitration rather than litigation. Disputes were referred to London and conducted under English Law.

In 1906, a group of traders broke away from the LCTA and formed a new more specialised association, the London Cattle Food Trade Association (LCFTA), for those trading in vegetable proteins used as animal feedingstuffs. In 1965, the LCFTA dropped ‘London’ from its title, reflecting growing internationalisation. In 1969, merger talks commenced between the LCTA and CFTA. The outcome of these talks was the formation of a new joint association, the Grain and Feed Trade Association, in 1971.

In 2008 the International General Produce Association (IGPA) joined the Grain and Feed Trade Association.

GAFTA is headquartered in Holborn, London, and currently operates four more offices, in Beijing, Geneva, Kyiv and Singapore.

== Goals and main objectives ==
GAFTA sets out to promote international trade and protect the interests of its members. Activities include definition and regulation of

- Quality standards, conditions of trade, guaranties
- Shipping documents and delivery conditions
- Terms of payment
- Maintenance of a Register of Superintendents
- Dealing with problems and extraordinary circumstances
- Insurance
- Non-Fulfillment
- Weighting rules, sampling, analysis and insurance

== GAFTA terms and conditions ==
It is estimated that 80% of all world trade in grains is supplied under GAFTA conditions. Rule 4.10 of GAFTA 125 requires notice of a claim to be served within one year of the incident giving rise to the claim. In the event of a dispute regarding the weight, quality or condition of a delivery, the GAFTA contract allows for appointment of GAFTA-approved surveyors representing both parties, and if there is a "major discrepancy" between the results of their surveys, then a third GAFTA-approved surveyor may be appointed as an arbitrator.

== See also ==
- Federation of Oils, Seeds and Fats Associations (FOSFA)
- Refined Sugar Association

== Literature ==
- Hugh Barty-King, Food for Man and Beast: The Story of the London Corn Trade Association, the London Cattle Food Trade Association and the Grain and Feed Trade Association, 1878–1978, London: Hutchinson, 1978
