= American Mushroom Institute =

Logo of the American Mushroom Institute.

The American Mushroom Institute is the industry trade group for the U.S. mushroom industry. The organization was founded in 1960 and is based in Avondale, Pennsylvania.

AMI provides its members with information and resources on topics such as food safety, sustainability, and nutrition. AMI offers a certification program for mushroom growers and processors called the Mushrooms for Life program.

In 2007 the Institute commissioned Chester County, Pa., author Bruce Mowday to compile a photographic history of the local industry. Chester County Mushroom Farming (Arcadia) was published in 2008.
