= TURYİD =

National restaurant association of Turkey

The Tourism Restaurant Investors and Gastronomy Enterprises Association (Turkish: Turizm Restaurant Yatırımcıları ve İşletmecileri Derneği; TURYID) is the national restaurant association for the wider restaurant industry in Turkey.

The association exists to develop the industry, promote its interests, coordinate the activities of its members, and liaise with external stakeholders such as the national and local governments.

TURYID also initiated and hosts the annual Global Gastroeconomic Summit, inaugurated in 2018.

As at November 2019 the association members had 187 brands, and approximately 1,250 outlets with 30,000 employees, collectively generating a total revenue of around US$3 billion per year from serving over 60 million guests.

Membership of TURYID is made up of restaurant (incl. f&b suppliers, bar, cafes, catering, event and entertainment establishment) operators and others associated with the industry.

The current President of TURYID is Mr Kaya Demirer. The association is headquartered in the Levent district of Istanbul.
