= Specialty Wine Retailers Association =

The Specialty Wine Retailers Association (SWRA) is a group representing the wine retail industry that works for the free movement of wine across state lines, whose stated goal is that any adult consumer in any state should be allowed to legally purchase and have shipped to them any wine from any retailer in America. The interests of SWRA lie in direct opposition to those of the Wine and Spirits Wholesalers of America (WSWA) over the issue of the three-tier alcohol distribution system.

Executive director of the SWRA is Tom Wark, and among the directors are Steve Bachmann and Gary Vaynerchuk.
