= International Dairy-Deli-Bakery Association =

The International Dairy Deli Bakery Association (IDDBA) is a non-profit trade association founded in 1964. Focused in the dairy, deli, and bakery industries, they promote growth through the exchange of ideas, inspiration, and information. They've cultivated this growth by providing consumer research, educational tools, training, resources, and the leading tradeshow for dairy, deli, and bakery. From small independents to the world’s largest corporations, the 1,600+ member companies include food retailers, manufacturers, wholesalers, brokers, distributors, and other industry professionals.

IDDBA produces original research, training programs, and on-the-job training guides covering a variety of topics. They publish an annual trends report, What’s in Store, which includes quarterly and annually updated data available online. In addition to educating their members, they also offer opportunities for professional development through scholarships, grants, and the IDDBA Career Center.

The annual tradeshow attracts over 10,000 registrants and over 2,000 exhibit booths. The show is an opportunity for companies to grow their businesses with networking, buying, selling, and an abundance of educational experiences. Some examples of how the show is used include top speakers, live demonstrations, merchandising ideas, and shelves of the hottest new products.
