= Scotland Food & Drink =

Scottish trade association

- Abbreviation: SF&D
- Legal status: Private company limited by guarantee
- Purpose: Umbrella group representing the Scottish food and drink industry
- Location: Ratho Park One, 88 Glasgow Road, Newbridge, Edinburgh, EH28 8PP
- Region served: Scotland
- Members: Companies within or associated with the Scottish food and drink industry
- Chief Executive: Iain Baxter
- Website: Scotland Food & Drink

Scotland Food & Drink is the industry leadership trade association established in 2007. It aims to collaboratively grow the value of the industry to £30 billion by 2030 and to reinforce the reputation of Scotland as a Land of Food and Drink.

In addition to its private sources of income it receives financial support from the Scottish Government.

Every year Scotland Food & Drink helps organise the Scottish Food and Drink Fortnight.

== History ==
Scotland Food & Drink was created in June 2007, and aims to brings together all key sectors of Scotland's food and drink industry, plus trade organisations and public sector agencies (Scottish Enterprise and Highlands and Islands Enterprise).

Its launch was the first official engagement of Richard Lochhead MSP in his role as Cabinet Secretary for Rural Affairs and the Environment for the Scottish Government. Since then, the organisation has developed and launched a new strategy for the entire industry called Ambition 2030 which looks to grow the industry to a value of £30bn by 2030.

Its inaugural chief executive, Paul McLaughlin, left in August 2011 to join Scotty Brand Ltd and was replaced in September 2011 by James Withers.

== Funding ==
Scotland Food & Drink is a membership organisation, funded by subscriptions. It also receives funding support from Scottish Government.

== Membership and affiliated groups ==
Members are drawn from across the Scottish food and drink industry, and include farmers, retailers, supporting organisations and trade associations. Members receive various benefits and services, and can contribute to industry-wide initiatives.

An executive group ensures support across the sectors. Its members include:

- Agriculture and Horticulture Development Board
- Dairy UK
- Highlands and Islands Enterprise
- Improve Ltd
- Lantra
- National Farmers Union Scotland
- Quality Meat Scotland
- Rowett Research Institute
- Scotch Whisky Association
- Scottish Agricultural College
- Scottish Agricultural Organisations Society (SAOS)
- Scottish Association of Master Bakers
- Scottish Enterprise
- Scottish Food & Drink Federation
- Scottish Salmon Producers Organisation
- Seafood Scotland
