= East Malling Research Station =

UK research organization

Coordinates: 51°17′26″N 0°26′02″E

NIAB EMR
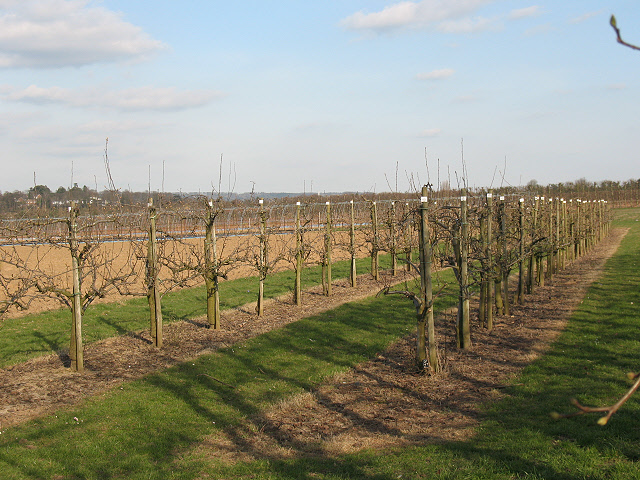
- An orchard at East Malling
- Abbreviation: NIAB EMR
- Formation: 1913
- Type: Research institute
- Legal status: Private company (09894859) and registered charity (1165055)
- Purpose: Horticulture research in the UK
- Headquarters: East Malling
- Location: New Road, East Malling, Kent, ME19 6BJ
- Region served: global
- Members: Horticultural scientists
- Managing Director: Professor Mario Caccamo
- Parent organization: NIAB
- Staff: 100
- Website: www.emr.ac.uk

NIAB EMR is a horticultural and agricultural research institute at East Malling, Kent in England, with a specialism in fruit and clonally propagated crop production. In 2016, the institute became part of the NIAB Group.

== History ==
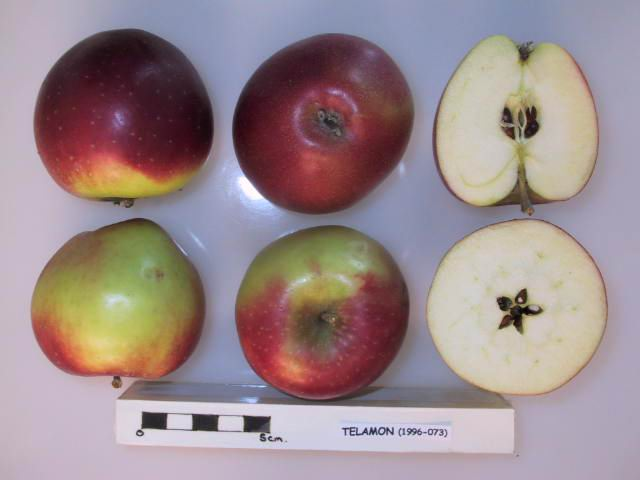
Telamon apple, cross-sectioned, NFC description: Raised in 1976 at East Malling Research Station, East Malling, Kent. Introduced in 1989. Fruits are sweet, crisp and juicy

In 1913, East Malling and Wye Fruit Experimental Station was established on 22 acres (8.9 ha) bought by Kent County Council at East Malling. It was under Wye College's control and initially advised by botanist V H Blackman of Imperial College. Ronald Hatton was appointed director of the station in 1914 and remained in post for the rest of his career. Hatton prioritised basic research; was concerned about the conditions of horticultural workers like fellow socialist, and principal of the college, Alfred Daniel Hall, and merely tolerated requests for practical advice from the growers he served. The station became independent of the college in 1921.

The original buildings are still in use today. Some of the finest and most important research on perennial crops has been conducted on the site, resulting in East Malling's worldwide reputation. Some of the more well-known developments have been achieved in the areas of plant raising, fruit plant culture (especially the development of rootstocks), fruit breeding, ornamental breeding, fruit storage and the biology and control of pests and diseases.

From 1990 a division of Horticulture Research International (HRI) was on the site. HRI closed in 2009.

In 2016, East Malling Research became part of the National Institute of Agricultural Botany (NIAB) group.

=== Apple rootstocks ===
In 1912, Ronald Hatton initiated the work of classification, testing and standardisation of apple tree rootstocks. With the help of Dr Wellington, Hatton sorted out the incorrect naming and mixtures then widespread in apple rootstocks distributed throughout Europe. These verified and distinct apple rootstocks are called the "Malling series". The most widespread used was the M9 rootstock.

== Location ==
It is situated east of East Malling, and north of the Maidstone East Line. The western half of the site is in East Malling and Larkfield and the eastern half is in Ditton. It is just south of the A20, and between junctions 4 and 5 of the M20 motorway.

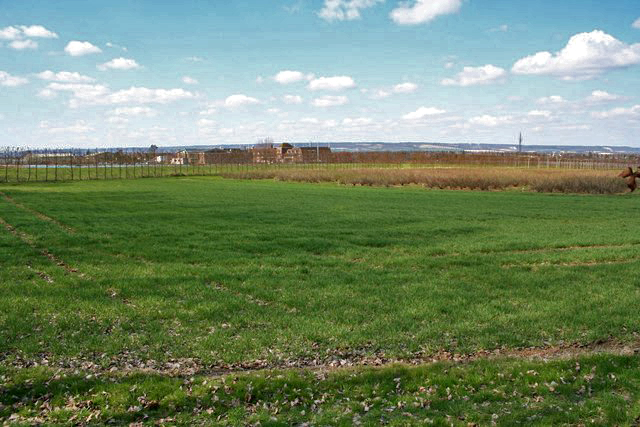
View from the east
