= National Hot Dog and Sausage Council =

American trade association

- Logo of the National Hot Dog and Sausage Council
- Abbreviation: NHDSC
- Formation: 1994; 32 years ago
- Type: Trade association
- Parent organization: American Meat Institute
- Website: hot-dog.org

The National Hot Dog and Sausage Council (NHDSC) is an American trade association that promotes the hot dog and sausage industry.

The council was founded in 1994 by the American Meat Institute and is headquartered in Washington, D.C.

The council promotes July as National Hot Dog Month, with National Hot Dog Day falling on the third Wednesday in July. Similarly, it promotes October as National Sausage Month.

In November 2015, the National Hot Dog and Sausage Council addressed a cultural discussion about whether or not a hot dog qualified as a type of sandwich, publishing a policy that a hot dog is not a sandwich. The council released its official position to end the debate.

== See also ==
- Hot Dog days
