= Europatat =

European trade association

- Formation: 1952; 74 years ago
- Type: IGO
- Legal status: Trade association
- Purpose: Lobby
- Headquarters: Rue des Deux Églises 26
- Location: Brussels, Belgium
- Coordinates: 50.8429°N 4.3753°E
- Region served: Europe
- Members: 70
- General Secretary: Berta Redondo
- Technical Affairs Director: Romans Vorss
- Website: europatat.eu
- Formerly called: European Union for the Wholesale Trade in Potatoes

Europatat, or the European Potato Trade Association, is a trade association of Europe national associations and companies involved in the trade of seed potatoes and ware potatoes. Europatat was established in 1952 and is located in Brussels, Belgium.

== History ==
Europatat was established on 12 January 1952 under the name European Union for the Wholesale Trade in Potatoes in Paris. Its first members were Belgium, Denmark, France, Germany, Italy, The Netherlands and Switzerland.

In September 2014, Raquel Izquierdo de Santiago replaced Frédéric Rosseneu as Secretary General of Europatat.
