= Southern Hemisphere Association of Fresh Fruit Exporters =

Trade association

The Southern Hemisphere Association of Fresh Fruit Exporters (SHAFFE) is a Trade Association which represents fresh fruit growers and exporters of the Southern Hemisphere. SHAFFE is a platform of exchange of information and cooperation which has been active since the early 1990s. The SHAFFE Presidency rotates on a bi-annual basis between members. The permanent secretariat is based in Brussels.

The Southern Hemisphere fruit production amounted in 2007 close to 71 million T (FAO data) out of which 41 million T are grown in Brazil, 8 mln T are grown in Argentina, 6 mln T are produced in Peru, 5.4 mln T in Chile, 3.4 mln T in Australia, 1 mln T in New Zealand and 600.000 T in Uruguay. The fruit basket includes all the varieties of deciduous fruit, stone fruit, citrus fruit, berries and exotics. Export to third countries might widely vary from one country to the other. In total, SHAFFE countries export more than 8 million T of fruit to international markets.

All work SHAFFE is undertaking aims to promote free trade and improve global market access. To achieve these common goals, SHAFFE holds regular meetings and carries out a range of diverse projects, market analyses and initiatives to support members’ actions in these fields. SHAFFE is particularly active in consolidating information about industry and trade data of the members, coordinating the position on food safety matters and harmonization of food safety standards and certification, promotional framework to develop counter season consumption in Northern Hemisphere markets.

SHAFFE unites currently representatives from all significant Southern Hemisphere countries exporting fresh fruits, including Argentina, Australia, Brazil, Chile, New Zealand, Peru, South Africa and Uruguay.
