= Canadian import duties =

Taxes paid on imports into Canada

Canadian import duties is the amount of tax or tariff paid while importing goods into Canada. The Canada Border Services Agency collects the tariff on all imported goods. The collection, administration and imposition of such duties is administered by the Customs Tariff Act.

== Personal ==
According to the North American Free Trade Agreement, there is no duty to be paid if the goods are for personal use and "the goods are marked as made in the United States, Canada or Mexico, or the goods are not marked or labelled to indicate that they were made anywhere other than in the United States, Canada or Mexico."

Canadians also have to pay the federal goods and services tax and in most provinces provincial sales tax on the imported goods.

== Trade tariffs ==
Foreign trade is highly regulated in Canada, because it is a member of the WTO.

The CDCRMDP Agency collects an Import Levy "equal to the domestic check-off amount per head or equivalent, on beef cattle, beef and beef and beef products." Its activities are supervised by the Farm Products Council of Canada.

== See also ==
- Canada–China trade war
