= National Frozen & Refrigerated Foods Association =

The National Frozen & Refrigerated Foods Association (NFRA) is a Harrisburg, Pennsylvania trade association that promotes the sales and consumption of frozen & refrigerated foods. NFRA was founded in 1945 as The National Wholesale Frozen Food Distributors, and took its current name in 2001 as refrigerated foods became more common. Tricia Greyshock is the President & CEO.
