= Worldwide Food Expo =

Biannual food technology event

Worldwide Food Expo (WWFE) is a biannual event which is considered to be the largest food and beverage technology event in North America. It has two events which are the Meat, Poultry & Seafood Exposition presented by American Meat Institute (AMI) International, and the Food, Dairy & Beverage Expo presented by the International Dairy Foods Association (IDFA). The event is attended by approximately 25,000 people from 100 countries.

The 2009 Worldwide Food Expo took place from October 28–31, 2009, at McCormick Place in Chicago, Illinois, United States. The event has been split into two different shows. After the split, the IDFA show took place from September 13–15, 2010, in Dallas. The AMI event - International Meat, Poultry & Seafood Industry Convention and Exposition portion of the show took place from April 13–16, 2011, in Chicago.
