= Malling series =

Apple cultivar

The Malling series is a group of rootstocks for grafting apple trees. It was developed at the East Malling Research Station of the South-Eastern Agricultural College at Wye in Kent, England. From about 1912, Ronald Hatton and his colleagues rationalised, standardised and catalogued the various rootstocks in use in Europe at the time under names such as Doucin and Paradise. Their first list had nine rootstock varieties, assigned the "type" numbers I–IX. The list later grew to twenty-four, and the Roman numerals gave way to Arabic numerals with the prefix "Malling" or "M.". From about 1917, collaboration between East Malling and the John Innes Institute, in Merton Park in Surrey, gave rise to the Malling-Merton series, which were resistant to Eriosoma lanigerum, the woolly apple aphid.

Common Malling rootstocks in the 1940s:

- US M2, M7, M8, M9 and M13
- UK M1, M2, M9, M12, M13 and M16.
- Germany M1, M2, M4, M5, M9, M11 and M16.

Relative size are dependent on climate, variety and soil.

M 1 - M24 rootstocks
Designation (Old designation)	Synonyms	Origin	Tree size a)	Tree size b)	Winter hardiness c)
M 1 (EM I)	Broad-leaved English paradise	England ca 1860	v	sd-ss	4
M 2 (EM II)	Doucin	France	v	sd-ss	4
M 3 (EM III)	Dutch doucin, Hollyleaf paradise, Königs splittapfel	?	sd	sd	6
M 4 (EM IV)	Holstein doucin, Yellow doucin	Unknown	sv	sd-ss	5
M 5 (EM V)	Doucin amelioré, Improved doucin, Red paradise	?	v	sd-ss	4
M 6 (EM VI)	Nonsuch paradise, Rivers's paradise	England ca 1860		sd	2
M 7 (EM VII)	-	France, 1600s	sd	sd-d	5
M 8 (EM VIII)	French paradise	<1696	d	d	2
M 9 (EM IX)	Jaune de metz, Yellow metz	France 1879	vd	d	3
M 10 (EM X)	U 1	?	vv	ss-s	2
M 11 (EM XI)	Green doucin	Germany, 1904	vv	ss	
M 12 (EM XII)	-	England	v	s	4
M 13 (EM XIII)	Black doucin, U 2	Germany ca 1890	v	sd-ss	4
M 14 (EM XIV)	U 5	Germany	v	ss	
M 15 (EM XV)	U 6	Germany	vv	ss-s	2
M 16 (EM XVI)	Ketziner ideal, U 3	Germany ca 1909	vv	ss-s	5
M 17	identical to M 5	Wageningen, Holland		sd	
M 18	-	Wageningen, Holland	v	ss	
M 19	-	Berlin, Germany	v	ss	
M 20	Spurious 9	France ?	vd	sd-d	
M 21	Cut-leaved 9	?	vd	sd-d	
M 22	-	Chelmsford, England	v	ss	
M 23	-	Chelmsford, England	v	sd	
M 24	Paradis de menton, Noir de menton,	?	v	ss	

a) East Malling vd= very dwarf, d= dwarf, sd= semidwarf, sv= semivigorous, v= vigorous, vv= very vigorous.

b) Tukey, Dwarfed fruit trees, 1964 d= dwarf, sd=semidwarf, ss= semistandard, s= standard.

c) Tukey, Dwarfed fruit trees, 1964 6= highest winter hardiness, 2= lowest winter hardiness.

M 25 - M 27 rootstocks
Name	Parentage	Cross made	Selected	Introduced
M 25	Northern Spy x M 2			1952
M 26	M 16 x M 9	1929		1958 or 1959
M 27	M 13 x M 9	1929	1934	1975

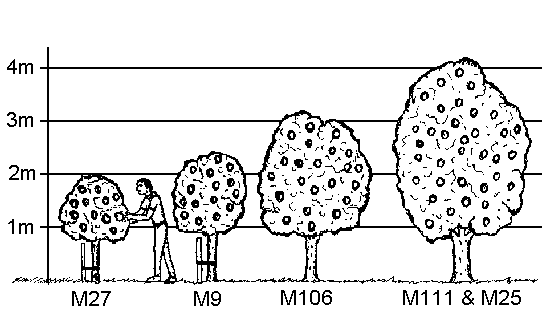
Size of an apple tree depending on the rootstock used

== Links ==
- Rootstock
- Rootstocks
- List and description of rootstocks
- Apple rootstock identification — NSW Department of Primary Industries — Series: Agfact H4.1.10 – Edition: Second edition – Last updated: 12 Jun 2001
- Apple Rootstock Fact Sheets, listed by size class
