= Federation of Oils, Seeds and Fats Associations =

Federation of Oils, Seeds and Fats Associations Ltd
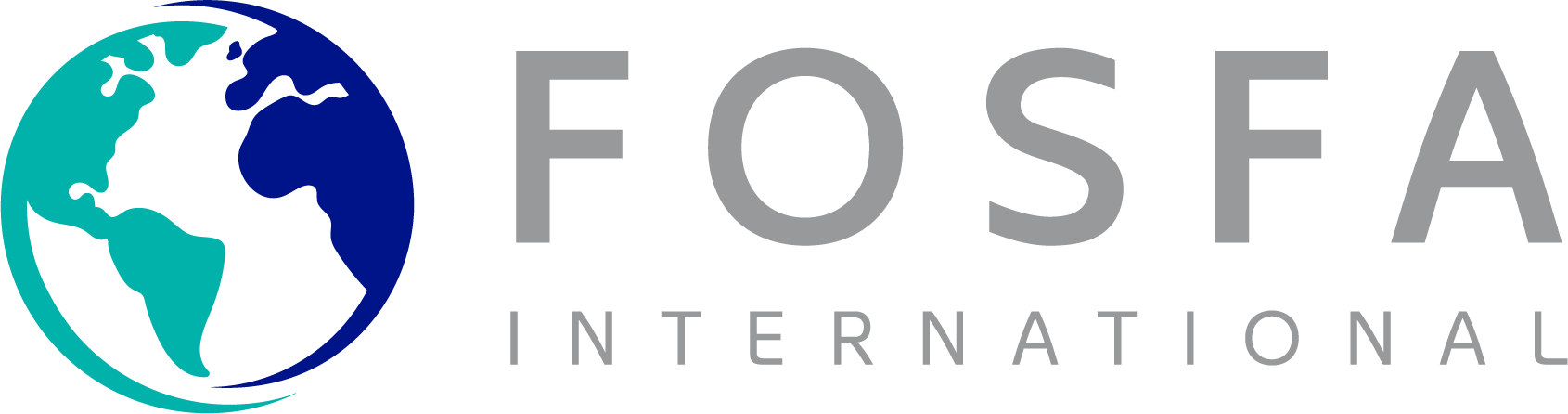
- Abbreviation: FOSFA International
- Formation: 25 January 1968; 58 years ago
- Type: Trade association
- Legal status: Private company
- Purpose: Representing the oil, seeds and fats industry
- Headquarters: London, EC2, United Kingdom
- Region served: Worldwide
- Members: 1208 companies in 89 countries
- Chief Executive: Iain Nicol
- Main organ: FOSFA Council (President - Leona Tout)
- Staff: 7
- Website: www.fosfa.org

The Federation of Oils, Seeds and Fats Associations (FOSFA International) is an international trade association for the oil, seeds and fats industry that is based in London. It regulates legal contracts in the trade/industry.

== History ==
FOSFA was incorporated in 1968. It serves communities in the United Kingdom.

== Function ==
85% of worldwide trade in oils and fats is under FOSFA contracts. It regulates trade in the industry. Its rules cover products transported with Cost, Insurance and Freight (CIF) or Freight on Board (FOB).

The advantage of having the vast majority of worldwide trade under FOSFA contracts is that using standard contracts reduces the risk of misinterpretations or misunderstandings between trading parties. Additionally, these standard form contracts are familiar to trading parties and reflective of trade practices that are longstanding in the industry.

It holds week-long residential training courses during the Autumn at The University of Greenwich.
