= Canadian Cattle Association =

Canadian advocacy group

- Formation: 1932; 94 years ago
- Location: Calgary, Alberta, Canada
- CEO: Andrea Brocklebank
- Formerly called: Canadian Cattlemen’s Association

The Canadian Cattle Association, previously known as the Canadian Cattlemen's Association is an advocacy group promoting the interests of cow-calf producers, feedlots, and packers in the Canadian beef industry.

== History ==
The association was founded in 1932. The CCA is made up of eight provincial members' organizations that provide the 27 members of the board of directors. The eight provincial member organizations include B.C. Cattlemen's Association, Alberta Beef Producers, Saskatchewan Cattlemen's Association, Manitoba Beef Producers, Beef Farmers of Ontario, New Brunswick Cattle Producers, Nova Scotia Cattle Producers and Prince Edward Island Cattle Producers.

According to the Federal lobbyist registry, from January to September 2012, the Canadian Cattlemen's Association had 113 contacts with federal officials to discuss issues such as financial loan guarantees, imports of non-NAFTA beef and veal, animal health, and livestock carcass grading regulations, making it the lobby group with the third most contacts that year.

In 2022, the association changed its name in 2022 to be more gender inclusive.

In 2025, the association called on the Government of Canada to terminate a Brexit-era trade agreement with the United Kingdom.

Citing governance concerns, in 2025 the Alberta Beef Producers association announced plans to withdraw from the association in 2026.

Since February 2026, the association has been led by CEO Andrea Brocklebank.

== See also ==
- National Cattlemen's Beef Association
