= FoodDrinkEurope =

- Formation: 1982
- Legal status: Non-profit organization
- Purpose: Represents the interests of the European food and drink sector
- Location: Avenue des Nerviens, 9-31, 1040 Brussels, Belgium
- Region served: Europe
- CEO: Dirk Jacobs (since 2022)
- Website: https://www.fooddrinkeurope.eu/

Founded in 1982, FoodDrinkEurope is a Food industry confederation in the European Union. It was formed by 26 national food-related federations, including 3 observers, 25 EU sector associations, and 19 major food and drink companies, all grouped in a Liaison Committee.

== History ==
The organization was founded in 1982 as Confederation of the Food and Drink Industries of the EU (French: Confédération des Industries Agro-Alimentaires de l'UE; CIAA).

In 2002, it lobbied to guarantee that new countries joining the EU first subscribe to most of EU's food policies before being accepted into the union.

The CIAA was renamed as FoodDrinkEurope in June 2011. In 2014, it launched a website to explain how the new Reference Intake system works.

In 2021, the advocacy group Foodwatch criticized FoodDrinkEurope for lobbying against the Nutri-Score (colour-coded nutrition label at European level) at the EU level for the past decade.

== Activities ==
FoodDrinkEurope develops the Guideline Daily Amounts pictograms displaying nutritional values on food packaging.

It lobbies the EU on agri-food economic plans and works on standardizing industry-funded research.

== Policies ==
The organisation supports the proposed Transatlantic Trade and Investment Partnership, arguing that it will reduce regulatory barriers, increase employment and encourage industry investment.

== See also ==
- Codex Alimentarius
