= World Apple and Pear Association =

International trade association

The World Apple and Pear Association (WAPA) is a trade association established in 2001 representing major apple and pear producing countries globally. The Association provides a forum for member discussion and reviews market information related to fruit trees. In 2007, world apple production reached 66 million tonnes while pear production amounted to 20.5 million tonnes. The secretariat of the association is located in Brussels.

== Functions ==
WAPA provides its members a forum to discuss issues affecting pear and apple producing countries and the international marketing of apples and pears. WAPA disseminates market information and is responsible for introducing a common language to improve the data flow and facilitate communication within each industry. In this respect, WAPA is also internationally responsible for compiling production forecasts for both the Northern and Southern Hemispheres. The Southern Hemisphere apple and pear forecast is given in February while the Northern Hemisphere forecast is given in August.

The global apple and pear business environment has let the association identify additional priorities for its work. In particular WAPA is seeking cooperative initiatives among its members to increase consumer demand for apples and pears by:

- Facilitating exchange and dissemination of scientific information citing nutritional benefits to boost demand
- Introducing common production best practices to ensure the product placed on the market is of the best possible quality and satisfies consumer expectations
- Discussing matters relating to marketing standards to improve the market position of apples and pears by developing close links with retail chains

== Membership ==
WAPA is open to any country that produces apples and pears for the fresh market. Each member country must designate the nationally recognized industry organization that represents the majority of national apple and pear producers. Currently, the following countries are members of WAPA: Argentina, Australia, Austria, Belgium, Brazil, Chile, France, Germany, Italy, the Netherlands, New Zealand, Poland, Serbia, Slovenia, South Africa, Ukraine, the United Kingdom and the United States.
