= Conexpo-Con/Agg =

Construction trade show held in Las Vegas, Nevada, US

- Status: Active
- Genre: Trade Show; Exhibition
- Frequency: Every three years
- Venue: Las Vegas Convention Center
- Location: Winchester, Nevada
- Country: United States
- Most recent: March 3–7 2026
- Next event: March 13–17 2029
- Sponsors: Association of Equipment Manufacturers; Associated General Contractors of America; National Ready Mixed Concrete Association; National Stone, Sand & Gravel Association
- Website: www.conexpoconagg.com

Conexpo-Con/Agg is North America’s largest construction trade show representing asphalt, aggregates, concrete, earthmoving, lifting, mining, utilities and more. Conexpo-Con/Agg is a result of the merger of Conexpo and Con/Agg in 1996. It is held at the Las Vegas Convention Center in Winchester, Nevada, United States.

== History ==
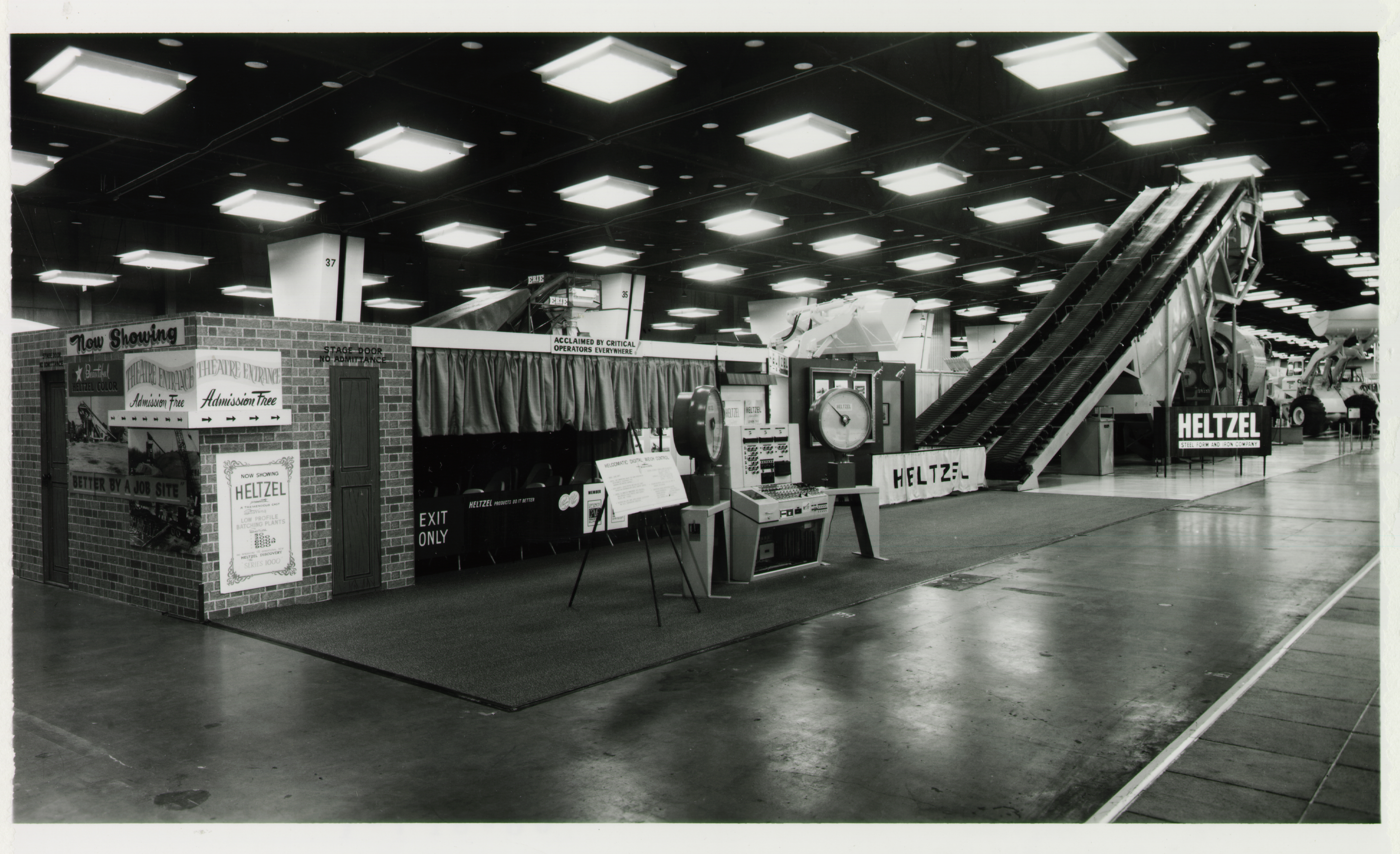
Conexpo exhibits in 1966

In 1909, the first Conexpo was held in Columbus, Ohio, and the first Con/Agg was held in Detroit, Michigan, in 1928. In 1996 the two shows merged, creating Conexpo-Con/Agg. The first joint show was held in 1996 in Las Vegas, Nevada. Conexpo-Con/Agg has gone on to become the Western Hemisphere's largest show for the construction and construction materials industries.

=== 2017 ===
The 2017 show spanned a record 2,800,000 sq ft (260,000 m^{2}) of exhibits, with a record 2,800-plus exhibitors. Show attendance neared 128,000 for the week. The world’s first 3D-printed excavator and the new Tech Experience debuted at the 2017 show.

=== 2020 ===
The March 2020 show ended one day earlier than normal due to growing concerns over COVID-19. Registrations for the show were reported as over 130,000, though no official attendance numbers were published. The 2020 show had over 2,000 exhibitors. A primary focus for the 2020 show was on women in construction and new technologies. The Tech Experience and education sessions reached their highest attendance since launching in the previous show with 150 sessions that included speakers from companies like Built Robotics, Trimble, and NASCAR driver Tyler Reddick.

=== 2023 ===
The show exceeded expected attendance numbers, drawing over 139,000 construction and fluid power professionals from 133 countries from March 14 to 18, making it the largest trade show in North America in 2023. It included 2,400 exhibitors from 36 countries spread over three million square feet (280,000 m^{2}) of exhibit space.

=== 2026 ===
The 2026 edition of CONEXPO-CON/AGG event drew more than 140,000 attendees from 128 countries and featured over 2,000 exhibitors occupying more than 3 million square feet of exhibit space. Exhibits this show focused on heavy equipment, digital jobsite technologies, automation, sustainability, and other innovations shaping the future of the construction industry. Educational programming included more than 150 sessions led by industry experts, including specialized workshop sessions focused on small business, women in construction and maintenance best practices. The Ground Breakers Stage, a new feature of the show, served as a venue for keynote discussions, awards programs, and presentations on emerging trends shaping the future of construction.

== Displayed products and services ==
The main topics of the show are:

- Aggregates
- Asphalt production and paving
- Admixtures
- Blasting
- Concrete
- Cement
- Compaction
- Drilling
- Engines and components
- Earthmoving
- Heavy-duty and off-road trucks
- Hydraulics
- Information technology
- Lifting equipment
- Lubricants
- Pumps

== Sponsors ==
Conexpo-Con/Agg is sponsored by:

- Association of Equipment Manufacturers
- Associated General Contractors of America
- National Ready Mixed Concrete Association
- National Stone, Sand & Gravel Association

== See also ==
- Association of Equipment Manufacturers
