= National Ready Mixed Concrete Association =

- Abbreviation: NRMCA
- Formation: 1930; 96 years ago
- Type: Nonprofit organization
- Headquarters: Alexandria, Virginia, US
- Region served: United States
- Website: Official website

The National Ready Mixed Concrete Association (NRMCA) is a nonprofit organization established in 1930 to support the ready mixed concrete industry in the United States.

== History ==
NRMCA was founded in 1930 and has since evolved into the leading advocate for the ready mixed concrete industry and has expanded its focus to include environmental sustainability, technological innovations and workforce training.

Since 1996, CONEXPO-CON/AGG, the trade show resulting from the merger of CONEXPO and CON/AGG, has been organized by the Association of Equipment Manufacturers (AEM), the National Ready Mixed Concrete Association (NRMCA), and the National Stone, Sand & Gravel Association (NSSGA). The resulting exhibition created the largest construction trade show in North America, showcasing advancements in construction, aggregates and ready mixed concrete industries.

In 2015, the Dubai Central Laboratory of the Dubai Municipality (DCL-DM) partnered with NRMCA to recognize the equivalencies of its concrete plant and truck certification programs, enabling Dubai-based facilities certified by DCL-DM to obtain internationally recognized NRMCA certification without additional audits.

== Programs and initiatives ==
NRMCA annually recognizes excellence in the industry through various awards and programs. Notable awards include "Excellence in Quality Awards" and "Environmental Excellence Awards."

The "ThinkFirst" safety program aims to reduce workplace injuries, while the "Driver of the Year" program and the "National Mixer Driver Championship" celebrate safety and driving excellence.

NRMCA promotes sustainable practices through its "Build With Strength" coalition, which has partnered with Habitat for Humanity to construct energy-efficient concrete homes using insulated concrete forms (ICFs). The association has also supported advancements in low-carbon concrete technologies and also promotes roller-compacted concrete (RCC) as a durable, sustainable and cost-effective paving solution.

NRMCA played a key role in New York State's "Buy Clean Concrete Guidelines," which established phased greenhouse gas (GHG) emissions limits for state-funded projects. NRMCA's benchmarks, developed through extensive data collection since 2014, have guided these initiatives, resulting in a reported 21% reduction in concrete's carbon footprint by 2021.

The association is also expanding Environmental Product Declaration (EPD) development with a $9.63 million EPA grant to train specialists and collect data from additional plants.
