= Polygood =

Recycled plastic surface material

- Type: Recycled plastic surface material
- Manufacturer: The Good Plastic Company

Polygood is a recycled plastic surface material produced by The Good Plastic Company. The panels are manufactured using only recycled post-consumer and post-industrial polystyrene plastic waste and are primarily used in sustainable furniture production and interior design.

== History ==
The Good Plastic Company, the creator of Polygood, was founded in 2018 with the goal of repurposing significant amounts of plastic waste to make a useful surface design material. The company began production in the Netherlands and later expanded operations to a larger facility in Ukraine. The company has significantly increased its production capacity through its evolving proprietary technology and equipment.

== Product information ==
Polygood comes in the form of 100% recycled and recyclable plastic panels, measuring 2800 x 1400 mm (110” x 55”), at 12mm or 19mm thick. Depending on the thickness, each panel weighs 50–78 kg (110-172 lbs). Panels are available in numerous patterns and colours, resembling materials such as terrazzo, marble, resins, and acrylics.

== Material and production ==
Composed of a single type of rPS, a robust raw material, the panels exhibit structural strength, in addition to resistance to water and mould. Polygood panels are fabricated using a single type of recycled polystyrene (rPS) obtained from sources such as refrigerators, single-use cutlery, electronic equipment, and industrial components. The production process involves custom CE-certified production machinery. The company processes more than 1,000 tonnes of recycled plastic panels annually.

== Applications ==
Polygood is mainly used in industrial-scale projects within retail, hospitality, educational, and office environments. Applications include retail fixtures, interior cladding, bathrooms, kitchens, facades, flooring, furniture, countertops, installations, window displays, signage, and light fixtures. The material is used by global companies such as Nike, Adidas, McDonald's, Samsung, MMozer, Coach, Footlocker, and Lush.

== Sustainability ==
Polygood is classified as a sustainable material. Due to its composition from recycled raw material and, its low-carbon and circular production process, among other environmentally-friendly practices, Polygood has achieved Cradle to Cradle Bronze Certification and has an Environmental Product Declaration, making the product suitable for WELL, LEED, and BREEAM credentials. It also has a favourable Global Warming Potential compared to competing surface materials or when using virgin materials. Used panels and offcuts are returned for free through a take-back programme that reuses the product or remanufactures it into new panels.

== Safety ==
Polygood panels have achieved various safety certifications. The product has a VOC A+ rating, indicating minimal volatile organic compound emissions. They are rated Euroclass E, s3-d0 for construction products and B(fl), s1 for flooring, indicating fire resistance. The panels are also certified safe for food contact under EU Commission Regulation 10/2011.
