= National Stone Centre =

Coordinates: 53.0936°N 1.5736°W

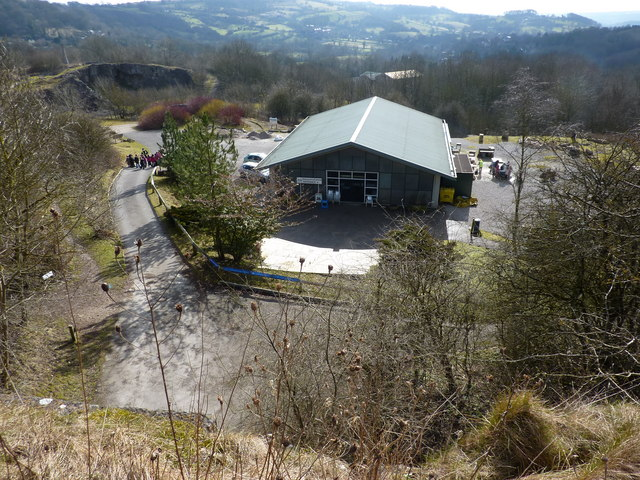
The National Stone Centre

The National Stone Centre is a museum, an industrial heritage discovery centre and a Site of Special Scientific Interest at Wirksworth, in Derbyshire, England.

== Location ==
The National Stone Centre is in the middle of the Derbyshire Dales and on the edge of the Peak District National Park. It covers an area of 50 acres that contains 6 disused stone quarries, over 102 old lead mineshafts and 4 lime kilns. The centre is not far from the Derwent Valley Mills World Heritage Site.

== Discovery Centre ==
The discovery centre has a Story of Stone exhibition as well as a range of rock and mineral shops and a café.

== Courses ==
The National Stone Centre runs courses for dry stonewalling and other crafts involving stone.

== See also ==
- National Stone, Sand & Gravel Association
