= The Good Plastic Company =

Dutch manufacturer of sustainable surface materials

- Type: Private
- Industry: Sustainable materials
- Founded: 2018
- Founder: William Chizhovsky
- Headquarters: Amsterdam, the Netherlands
- Area served: Worldwide
- Key people: William Chizhovsky (CEO & founder)
- Products: 100% recycled plastic panels
- Website: thegoodplasticcompany.com

The Good Plastic Company is a Dutch manufacturer of sustainable surface materials, specialising in fully recycled and recyclable plastic panels for furniture and interior design. It was founded by William Chizhovsky in 2018. The company's main product line is Polygood.

== History ==
The Good Plastic Company was established in 2018 by William Chizhovsky, with a focus on large design and architecture projects for companies in need of sustainable surface materials that meet environmental targets. In 2019, the company set up its first manufacturing facility in the Netherlands and started investing in R&D.

In 2021, the Good Plastic Company expanded its manufacturing operations with a larger facility in Ukraine, processing over 1,000 tonnes of recycled plastic panels annually. The company specializes in the manufacture of a proprietary material they call Polygood, which is made into panels that are used in the retail, hospitality, education, healthcare, and residential sectors for interior and exterior design elements.

The company operates across seven locations globally. With two factories in Europe, it has expanded its distribution network to the United Kingdom and Ireland, the Middle East, India, France, Scandinavia, Spain, and North America.

== Technology and products ==
The company's technology converts plastic waste into high-quality surface materials. Using custom in-house developed press machines, the Good Plastic Company produces Polygood panels with a level of precision and efficiency not achievable with standard machinery.

The company introduced fire- and scratch-resistant coatings in 2023.

== Sustainability ==
The Polygood line has received Cradle-to-Cradle Bronze Certification and a verified Environmental Product Declaration, making it a sustainable choice for LEED- and BREEAM-certified projects and credits.

The material's global warming potential rating of 1,074 kg per metric tonne is eight times lower than manufacturing virgin polystyrene.
