= Embedded emissions =

Measure of greenhouse gas emissions

Embedded CO₂ in global trade, 2023

One way of attributing greenhouse gas emissions is to measure the embedded emissions of goods that are being consumed (also referred to as "embodied emissions", "embodied carbon emissions", or "embodied carbon"). This is different from the question of to what extent the policies of one country to reduce emissions affect emissions in other countries (the "spillover effect" and "carbon leakage" of an emissions reduction policy). The UNFCCC measures emissions according to production, rather than consumption. Consequently, embedded emissions on imported goods are attributed to the exporting, rather than the importing, country. The question of whether to measure emissions on production instead of consumption is partly an issue of equity, i.e., who is responsible for emissions.

The 37 parties listed in Annex B to the Kyoto Protocol have agreed to legally binding emission reduction commitments. Under the UNFCCC accounting of emissions, their emission reduction commitments do not include emissions attributable to their imports. In a briefing note, Wang and Watson (2007) asked the question, "who owns China's carbon emissions?". In their study, they suggested that nearly a quarter of China's CO_{2} emissions might be a result of its production of goods for export, primarily to the US but also to Europe. Based on this, they suggested that international negotiations based on within country emissions (i.e., emissions measured by production) may be "[missing] the point".

2010 research confirmed that, in 2004, 23% of global emissions were embedded in goods traded internationally, mostly flowing from China and developing countries, such as Russia and South Africa, to the US, Europe and Japan. These states are included in a group of ten, as well as the Middle East, that make up 71% of the total difference in regional emissions. In Western Europe the difference in the import and export of emissions is particularly pronounced, with imported emissions making up 20-50% of consumed emissions. The majority of the emissions transferred between these states is contained in the trade of machinery, electronics, chemicals, rubber and plastics.

Research by the Carbon Trust in 2011 further confirmed that approximately 25% of all CO_{2} emissions from human activities 'flow' (i.e. are imported or exported) from one country to another. The flow of carbon was found to be roughly 50% emissions associated with trade in commodities such as steel, cement, and chemicals, and 50% in semi-finished/finished products such as motor vehicles, clothing or industrial machinery and equipment.

== Embodied carbon in construction ==
Estimates of embodied carbon predominantly rely on life-cycle assessments (LCA). Life-cycle assessments evaluate the environmental impacts across every phase of a building's life-cycle. Among the measured environmental impacts, carbon emissions are the most frequently reported.

Embodied carbon originates from several key processes throughout a building’s life-cycle. Embodied emissions are generated through fossil fuel combustion that can occur during transportation, the extraction of raw materials, manufacturing of materials, and the operation of on-site construction machinery. Furthermore, the energy grid powering material manufacturing contributes to embodied emissions. Beyond the initial construction of a building, emissions can be tied to the ongoing maintenance and repair of component building parts or systems and can also be released during end-of-life treatment in the form of processes such as incineration.

Various studies estimate embodied carbon accounts for 30% to 40% of global carbon emissions within the construction sector. As building performance standards and system efficiencies have advanced, operational carbon emissions have decreased. The resultant share of embodied carbon over a building’s life-cycle has subsequently increased from approximately 20% to 50%, depending on the efficiency of the building.

Driven largely by material inputs such as cement, brick, metal, and glass, global carbon emissions connected to the construction sector rose in 2022 compared to the previous three decades. Researchers and industry bodies have called for decarbonisation of the sector. The World Green Building Council is among such organizations and has set a target for all new buildings to have at least 40% less embodied carbon.

Calculating embodied emission in the construction sector presents several challenges due to data and methodological inconsistencies. For example, a literature review identified ten key parameters that directly influence the quality and variability of embodied energy estimates, most notably what is considered in the studied system, geographic location, and age and completeness of data. Similarly, another study highlighted the complexity of building life-cycle assessments within the building sector, noting that variations in the assumptions surrounding life-cycle phases severely limit comparability between studies.

Re-use is a key consideration when addressing embodied carbon in construction. The architect Carl Elefante is known for coining the phrase, "The greenest building is the building that is already built." The reason that existing buildings are usually more sustainable than new buildings is that the quantity of carbon emissions which occurs during construction of a new building is large in comparison to the annual operating emissions of the building, especially as operations become more energy efficient and energy supplies transition to renewable generation.

Beyond re-use, and excluding material extraction, which often accounts for high levels of embodied carbon, there are two principal areas of focus in the reduction of embodied carbon in construction. The first is to reduce the quantity of construction material ('construction mass') while the second is the substitution of lower carbon alternative materials. Typically—where reduction of embodied carbon is a goal—both of these are addressed.

Often, the most significant scope for reduction of construction mass is found in structural design, where measures such as reduced beam or slab span (and an associated increase in column density) can yield large carbon savings.

To assist material substitution (with low carbon alternatives), manufacturers of materials such as steel, steel re-bar, glulam, and precast concrete typically provide Environmental Product Declarations (EPD) which certify the carbon impact as well as general environmental impacts of their products. Databases that aggregate the embodied carbon values from EPD's and other sources such as academic studies, provide the embodied carbon values of many materials in one location, however the number of variables included in calculating the embodied carbon of building materials makes the values in the databases difficult to compare.

Minimizing the use of carbon-intensive materials may mean selecting lower carbon versions of glass and steel products, and products manufactured using low-emissions energy sources. Embodied carbon may be reduced in concrete construction through the use of Portland cement alternatives such as Ground granulated blast-furnace slag, recycled aggregates and industry by-products. Carbon-neutral, carbon positive, and carbon-storing materials include bio-based materials such as timber, bamboo, hemp fibre and hempcrete, wool, dense-pack cellulose insulation, and cork.

A 2021 study focused on "carbon-intensive hotspot materials (e.g., concrete foundations and slab floors, insulated roof and wall panels, and structural framing) in light industrial buildings" estimated that a "sizable reduction (~60%) in embodied carbon is possible in two to three years by bringing readily-available low-carbon materials into wider use".

== Top-down, bottom-up and hybrid approaches ==
Three major approaches are used to quantify embodied carbon.

The first approach is a bottom-up approach, also called process-based life cycle assessment (LCA). This approach enables a specific assessment of individual products. LCA practitioners commonly employ LCA software, such as openLCA or SimaPro, often combining background data from databases such as ecoinvent. This approach can be tailored more accurately to individual projects, especially by employing product-specific environmental product declarations (EPDs). The drawback of the process-based approach is truncation because it is impossible to fully assess the embodied carbon of the targeted supply chain. The truncation includes the exclusion of a process in the supply chain, a material or product, and any omission due to either the assumed insignificance of their contribution to the final result or a lack of data.

The second approach is to employ environmentally extended input-output (EEIO) model, a top-down technique to attribute greenhouse gas (GHG) to final demand in the economic activity. The EEIO uses national economic input-output tables along GHG emissions data for a given industry and product to estimate the supply chain embodied emissions. These values are derived by multiplying GHG intensity (e.g., tCO2e/USD) by the final demand of each product. This approach is particularly effective when consumption-based carbon emission is calculated. Multi-region input-output (MRIO) analysis, a subtype of IO, is used to account for trade impacts of the economic activity between regions or countries. EXIOBASE, an environmentally extended MRIO database, is widely used to calculate consumption based emission at the global scale.

However, the aggregation of economic sector in EEIO makes it difficult to assess specific products. For example, the decarbonization effort that switches steel manufacturing from basic oxygen furnace (BOF) to electric arc furnace (EAF) may not necessarily be captured at the product level unless the production via BOF and EAF are independently accounted for in the model.

To alleviate the drawbacks of both approaches, the third hybrid approach was introduced. This approach can minimize truncation issues in the bottom-up approach by reflecting comprehensive economic data from top-down approach while process-based LCA can provide more data granularity in the EEIO approach.

== Embodied carbon policy and legislation ==
Different views on a ban for products that emit more greenhouse gases in the EU, China and the US among respondents of the 2020–21 European Investment Bank Climate Survey

A variety of policies, regulations, and standards exist worldwide with respect to embodied carbon, according to the American Institute of Architects.

Eight American states introduced procurement policies related to embodied carbon in 2021: Washington, Oregon, California, Colorado, Minnesota, Connecticut, New York, and New Jersey.

In Colorado, HB21-1303: Global Warming Potential for Public Project Materials (better known as "Buy Clean Colorado") was signed into law 6 July 2021. The law uses environmental product declarations (EPDs) to help drive the use of low-embodied-carbon materials.

"In Europe, embodied carbon emissions have been limited in the Netherlands since 2018, and this is scheduled to happen in Denmark, Sweden, France and Finland between 2023 and 2027."

"On May 10, 2023, Toronto became the first community in North America to require lower-carbon construction materials in new construction projects, limiting embodied carbon from new city-owned municipal building construction. New buildings must now limit upfront embodied emission intensity — emissions associated with manufacturing, transporting, and constructing major structural and envelope systems — to below 350 kg CO2e/m2." The new requirements are currently voluntary for non-city-owned buildings.

== See also ==
- Carbon footprint
- Emissions embodied in international trade
- Embodied energy
