= Saturated-surface-dry =

Aggregate or porous solid condition

Saturated surface dry (SSD) is defined as the condition of an aggregate in which the surfaces of the particles are "dry" (i.e., surface adsorption would no longer take place), but the inter-particle voids are saturated with water. In this condition aggregates will not affect the free water content of a composite material.

The water adsorption by mass (A_{m})) is defined in terms of the mass of saturated-surface-dry (M_{ssd}) sample and the mass of oven dried test sample (M_{dry}) by

$A = \frac{M_{ssd}-M_{dry}}{M_{dry}}$

== See also ==
- Construction aggregate
