= Aggregate (composite) =

Term used for composite materials

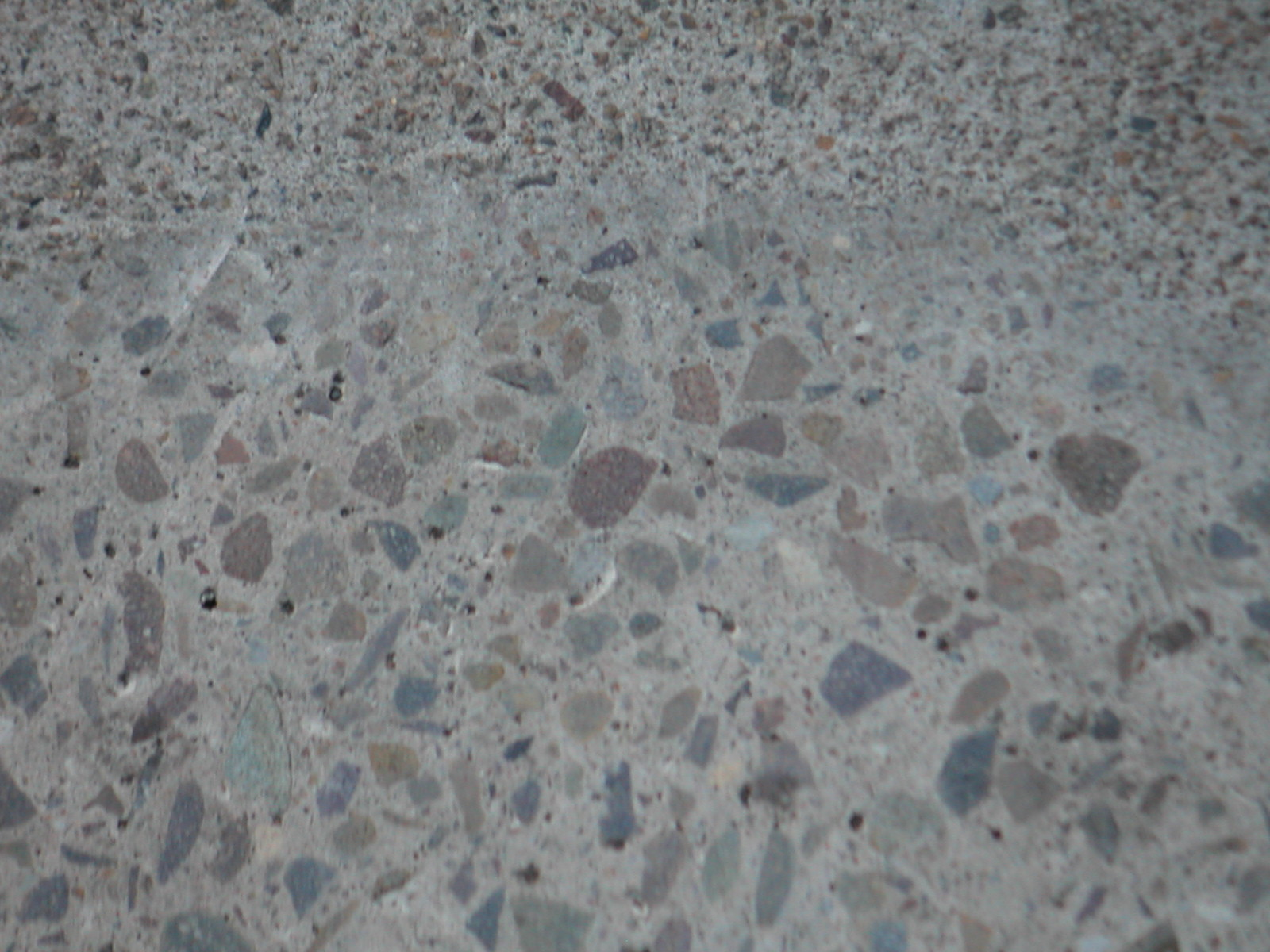
Grinding concrete exposes aggregate stones.

Aggregate is the component of a composite material that resists compressive stress and provides bulk to the material. For efficient filling, aggregate should be much smaller than the finished item, but have a wide variety of sizes. Aggregates are generally added to lower the amount of binders needed and to increase the strength of composite materials.

Sand and gravel are used as construction aggregate with cement to make concrete and increase its mechanical strength. Aggregates make up 60–80% of the volume of concrete and 70–85% of the mass of concrete.

== Comparison to fiber composites ==
Aggregate composites are easier to fabricate, and more predictable in their finished properties, than fiber composites. Fiber orientation and continuity can have a large effect, but can be difficult to control and assess. Aggregate materials are generally less expensive. Mineral aggregates are found in nature and can often be used with minimal processing.

Not all composite materials include aggregate. Aggregate particles tend to have about the same dimensions in every direction (that is, an aspect ratio of about one), so that aggregate composites do not display the level of synergy that fiber composites often do. A strong aggregate held together by a weak matrix will be weak in tension, whereas fibers can be less sensitive to matrix properties, especially if they are properly oriented and run the entire length of the part (i.e., a continuous filament).

Most composites are filled with particles whose aspect ratio lies somewhere between oriented filaments and spherical aggregates. A good compromise is chopped fiber, where the performance of filament or cloth is traded off in favor of more aggregate-like processing techniques. Ellipsoid and plate-shaped aggregates are also sometimes used.

== Properties ==
In most cases, the ideal finished piece would be 100% aggregate. A given application's most desirable quality (be it high strength, low cost, high dielectric constant, or low density) is usually most prominent in the aggregate itself. However, the aggregate lacks the ability of a liquid to flow and fill up a volume, and to form attachments between particles.

=== Aggregate size ===
Experiments and mathematical models show that more of a given volume can be filled with hard spheres if it is first filled with large spheres, then the spaces between (interstices) are filled with smaller spheres, and the new interstices filled with still smaller spheres as many times as possible. For this reason, control of particle size distribution can be quite important in the choice of aggregate; appropriate simulations or experiments are necessary to determine the optimal proportions of different-sized particles.

The upper limit to particle size depends on the amount of flow required before the composite sets (the gravel in paving concrete can be fairly coarse, but fine sand must be used for tile mortar), whereas the lower limit is due to the thickness of matrix material at which its properties change (clay is not included in concrete because it would "absorb" the matrix, preventing a strong bond to other aggregate particles). Particle size distribution is also the subject of much study in the fields of ceramics and powder metallurgy.

=== Toughened composites ===
Toughness is a compromise between the (often contradictory) requirements of strength and plasticity. In many cases, the aggregate will have one of these properties, and will benefit if the matrix can add what it lacks. Perhaps the most accessible examples of this are composites with an organic matrix and ceramic aggregate, such as asphalt concrete ("tarmac") and filled plastic (i.e., Nylon mixed with powdered glass), although most metal matrix composites also benefit from this effect. In this case, the correct balance of hard and soft components is necessary or the material will become either too weak or too brittle.

=== Nanocomposites ===
Many material properties change radically at small length scales (see nanotechnology). In the case where this change is desirable, a certain range of aggregate size is necessary to ensure good performance. This naturally sets a lower limit to the amount of matrix material used.

Unless some practical method is implemented to orient the particles in micro- or nano-composites, their small size and (usually) high strength relative to the particle-matrix bond allows any macroscopic object made from them to be treated as an aggregate composite in many respects.

While bulk synthesis of such nanoparticles as carbon nanotubes is currently too expensive for widespread use, some less extreme nanostructured materials can be synthesized by traditional methods, including electrospinning and spray pyrolysis. One important aggregate made by spray pyrolysis is glass microspheres. Often called microballoons, they consist of a hollow shell several tens of nanometers thick and approximately one micrometer in diameter. Casting them in a polymer matrix yields syntactic foam, with extremely high compressive strength for its low density.

Many traditional nanocomposites escape the problem of aggregate synthesis in one of two ways:

Natural aggregates: By far the most widely used aggregates for nano-composites are naturally occurring. Usually these are ceramic materials whose crystalline structure is extremely directional, allowing it to be easily separated into flakes or fibers. The nanotechnology touted by General Motors for automotive use is in the former category: a fine-grained clay with a laminar structure suspended in a thermoplastic olefin (a class which includes many common plastics like polyethylene and polypropylene). The latter category includes fibrous asbestos composites (popular in the mid-20th century), often with matrix materials such as linoleum and Portland cement.

In-situ aggregate formation: Many micro-composites form their aggregate particles by a process of self-assembly. For example, in high impact polystyrene, two immiscible phases of polymer (including brittle polystyrene and rubbery polybutadiene) are mixed together. Special molecules (graft copolymers) include separate portions which are soluble in each phase, and so are only stable at the interface between them, in the manner of a detergent. Since the number of this type of molecule determines the interfacial area, and since spheres naturally form to minimize surface tension, synthetic chemists can control the size of polybutadiene droplets in the molten mix, which harden to form rubbery aggregates in a hard matrix. Dispersion strengthening is a similar example from the field of metallurgy. In glass-ceramics, the aggregate is often chosen to have a negative coefficient of thermal expansion, and the proportion of aggregate to matrix adjusted so that the overall expansion is very near zero. Aggregate size can be reduced so that the material is transparent to infrared light.

== See also ==
- Construction aggregate
- Aggregate (geology)
- Interfacial Transition Zone (ITZ)
- Saturated-surface-dry
