= Association of Equipment Manufacturers =

- Abbreviation: AEM
- Predecessor: Construction Industry Manufacturers Association (CIMA), Equipment Manufacturers Institute (EMI)
- Founded: 1894
- Type: Trade association
- Headquarters: Milwaukee, Wisconsin
- Location(s): Milwaukee, Washington, Ottawa, and Beijing
- Members: 1,000
- Key people: Todd Stucke and Megan Tanel
- Employees: 279
- Website: aem.org

The Association of Equipment Manufacturers (AEM) is a North American trade association representing off-road equipment manufacturers and suppliers. AEM represents more than 1,000 companies with more than 200 product lines in agriculture and construction-related industry sectors worldwide. AEM is based in Milwaukee, Wisconsin.

== History ==
AEM's origins extend as far back as 1894 when a trade association for farm equipment was founded. This group merged with another organization representing manufacturers of construction equipment and changed its name to the Association of Equipment manufacturers in 2002. The merger was effective on January 1, 2002. These predecessor organizations were the Equipment Manufacturers Institute (EMI) and the Construction Industry Manufacturers Association (CIMA).

EMI members were agricultural, industrial, and construction equipment manufacturers. CIMA served manufacturers of construction equipment and related products. The two associations believed that by combining they would have a stronger voice in policy, be able to offer more services, and develop more international trade opportunities.

In 2025, AEM announced it would be opening a new office in Ottawa the following year. The group also announced the hiring of its first full-time employee in Ottawa.

=== Post-merger ===
In 2015, AEM renewed its "Alliance Agreement" with the Mine Safety and Health Administration. The agreement facilitates providing mining workers with training on the safety information. The arrangement is authorized by statute.

As of 2017, AEM was based in Milwaukee, Wisconsin with offices in the District of Columbia, Beijing, and Ottawa.

From 1998 to 2021, AEM increased its membership by 50%. Over the same period, its annual budget grew by 700% to $60 million.

In late 2024, Linda Hasenfratz was elected to be the chair of AEM for 2025. Hasenfratz is the executive chair of Linamar.

== Advocacy ==
AEM's political advocacy focuses on infrastructure improvements, improving the health of the rural economy with a special emphasis on farming and small towns, workforce issues such as job training, international trade, industrial policy, taxes, and immigration.

=== Infrastructure ===
AEM supports comprehensive infrastructure spending including improvements to roads, highways, bridges, computer networks, electrical grids, water and sewage systems, ports, and inland waterways.

AEM supported the Infrastructure Investment and Jobs Act that became law in 2021.

=== Manufacturing Express ===
In 2024, AEM conducted the Manufacturing Express bus tour, which visited equipment manufacturing sites in 80 communities in 20 states across America. The tour promoted the "contributions of our industry's workers to local economies and our nation's prosperity." Tour stops included meetings with policymakers on policies important to AEM members, industry leaders, and manufacturing workers.

== Leadership ==
=== Megan Tanel ===
As of 2025, the president of AEM was Megan Tanel. Tanel joined AEM in 1995 as a vice president specializing in event management. Tanel holds an undergraduate degree from the University of Wisconsin-La Crosse. In 2017, Tanel was given the Woman of Achievement Award by the International Association of Exhibitions and Events.

== Members ==
As of 2017, AEM had 975 members. These include most of the large manufacturers in the off-road equipment industry. As of late 2024, this had increased to over 1,100 members

== Events ==
AEM holds many educational events, conferences, and trade shows.

=== Trade shows ===
==== Conexpo-Con/Agg ====
Conexpo-Con/Agg is the western hemisphere's largest construction trade show representing asphalt, aggregates, concrete, earthmoving, lifting, mining, utilities and more. Conexpo-Con/Agg is a result of the merger of Conexpo and Con/Agg in 1996. It is held at the Las Vegas Convention Center.

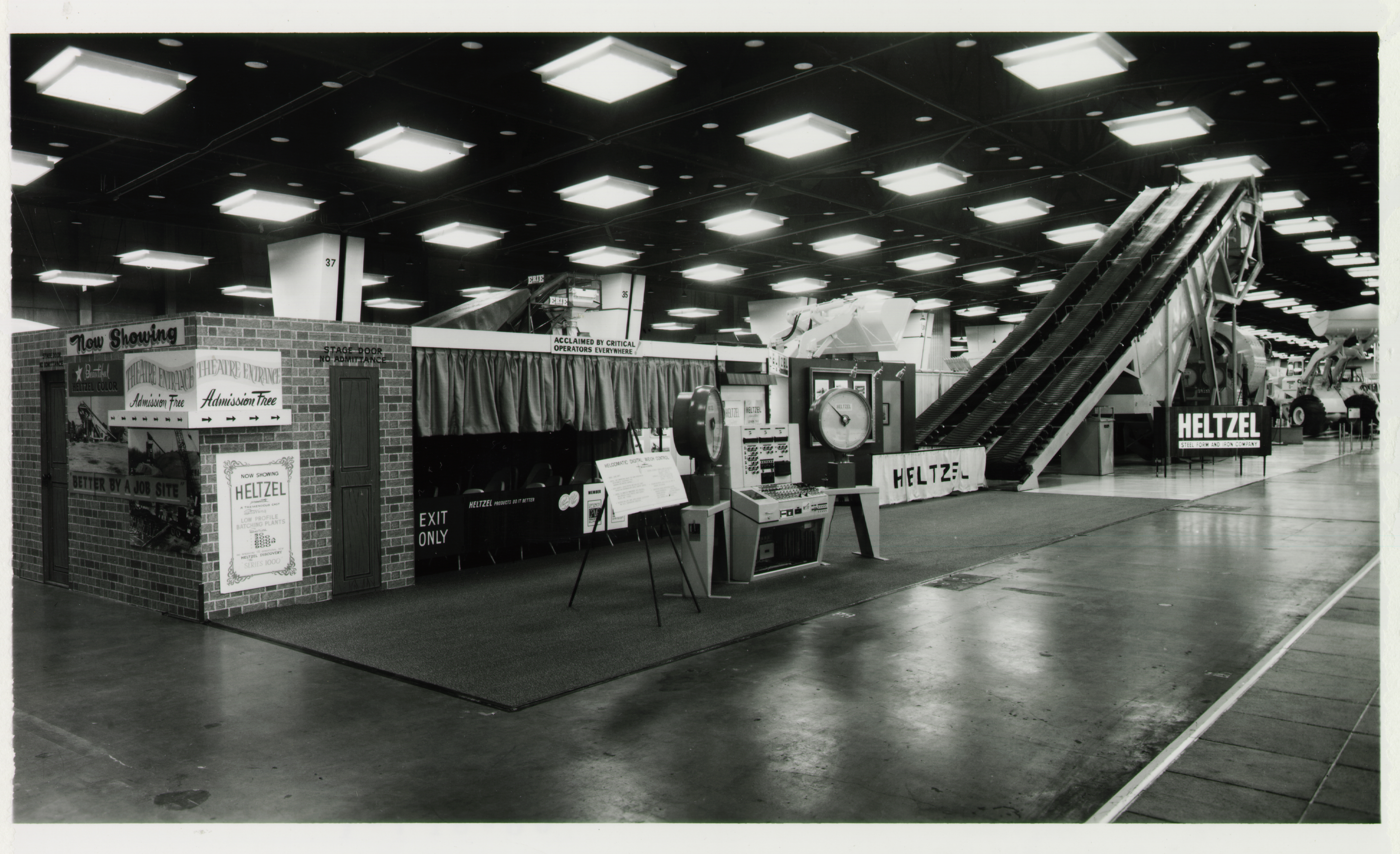
Conexpo 1966

In 1909, the first Conexpo was held in Columbus, Ohio, and the first Con/Agg was held in Detroit Michigan in 1928. The first joint show was held in 1996 in Las Vegas, Nevada. Conexpo-Con/Agg has gone on to become the western hemisphere's largest show for the construction and construction materials industries.

Conexpo-Con/Agg is one of a few of trade shows that participate in the federal International Buyer Program. This program makes it easier for international attendees to come to the show and conduct business. AEM provides numerous on-site services for such attendees to make it easier for them to do business at the show. The United States Export-Import Bank also attends to facilitate deals between exhibitors and international buyers.

==== The Utility Expo ====
The Utility Expo is a bi-annual trade show focused on the needs of utility and construction workers and contractors. In 2023, the event attracted about 21,000 attendees from around the world. Equipment demonstrations are a defining feature of the event. The show also offers educational sessions and workshops. Prior to 2021, the event was known as the International Construction & Utility Equipment Exposition. The expo has origins dating back to the 1960s.

==== Commodity Classic ====
AEM, along with several other organizations, sponsors the Commodity Classic. The Commodity Classic is an annual trade show focused on agriculture that features equipment exhibitions, training, networking opportunities, contests, and awards relevant to commodity producers and agricultural equipment manufacturers.

==== World of Asphalt ====
AEM is one of several owners of the World of Asphalt trade show. The event is a product showcase for manufacturers and service providers specializing in aggregate, asphalt, pavement maintenance, and road safety.

=== Other events ===
==== Product Safety & Compliance and Liability Seminars ====
AEM hosts annual Product Safety & Compliance and Liability Seminars. These provide education on industry-relevant risk assessment, hazard communication, technical publications, regulatory compliance, incident investigation, litigation, etc.

==== Celebration of Modern Ag ====
AEM holds an annual event in Washington, DC called the Celebration of Modern Ag. The purpose of the event is to promote the benefits of modern farming technology.

== Publications ==
AEM publishes the "State of the Ag Industry Outlook." This publication forecasts sales of farm equipment.

== Awards ==
=== AEM Hall of Fame ===
AEM inducts honorees into its Hall of Fame to educate the public and other stakeholders about the importance of the off-road equipment industry. Inductees are people who have "invented, managed, built and led the off-road equipment industry."

Some notable inductees are:

- Joseph Cyril Bamford (1916–2001), founder of JCB
- Sir Anthony Bamford (born 1945), son of above
- Daniel Best founder of Best Manufacturing Company
- J. I. Case (1819–1891), founder of Case Corporation
- William Dana Ewart, founder of Link-Belt Construction Equipment Company
- Ronald M. DeFeo, Terex
- Donald V. Fites, Caterpillar Inc.
- J.C. Gorman, Gorman-Rupp Company
- John L. Grove (1921–2003), founder of Grove Manufacturing Company
- Henry Harnishfeger (1855–1930), P&H Mining
- Benjamin Holt (1849–1920), founder of Holt Manufacturing Company
- Simon Ingersoll (1818–1894), founder of Ingersoll Rock Drill Company
- R. G. LeTourneau (1888–1969), earthmover
- Hans Liebherr, Liebherr Group
- William Otis (1813–1839), inventor of the steam shovel

=== Manufacturing Trailblazer ===
AEM offers a lifetime achievement award called the Manufacturing Trailblazer to important industry figures.
