= Aggregate industry in the United States =

In 2023, the aggregate industry in the United States mined and sold 1.5 billion tons of crushed stone valued at more than $24 billion and 920 million tons of construction sand and gravel valued at $11 billion. There are thousands of aggregate-producing companies in the US, operating in each of the 50 states, and employing 105,000 people. Most aggregate is used by the construction industry, where it is an essential raw material and the main ingredient in concrete and asphalt concrete.

== Industry structure ==
As of 2023, there were about 3400 companies mining sand and gravel, and 1400 mining crushed rock in the United States, with many companies doing both.

Top crushed rock companies as of 2015, in order of descending tonnage. The top ten companies provided 45 percent of the crushed rock produced in the US.

Rank Company
1. Martin Marietta Aggregates
2. Vulcan Materials Company
3. Oldcastle Materials, Inc.
4. Lehigh Hanson, Inc.
5. CEMEX S.A.B. de C.V.
6. Lafarge North America Inc.
7. Rogers Group, Inc.
8. Charmeuse Lime & Stone
9. Holcim Group
10. Lhoist North America

Top sand and gravel companies as of 2015, in order of descending tonnage. The top ten provided 53 percent of the sand and gravel produced in the US.

Rank Company
1. Oldcastle Materials, Inc.
2. Vulcan Materials Co.
3. Lehigh Hanson, Inc.
4. CEMEX S.A.B. de C.V.
5. MDU Resources Group, Inc.
6. Holcim Group
7. Martin Marietta Aggregates
8. Granite Construction, Inc.
9. Summit Materials, LLC
10. Mitsubishi Cement Corp.

== Use ==
Most aggregate is used in construction, including 97 percent of sand and gravel and 76 percent of crushed rock. Per capita usage in the United States in 1996 was 8.7 metric tons per year.

Use, and therefore production of aggregate, is determined by the construction industry. Production in 2017 was well below the peak of 3.1 billion tons mined in 2006, during the height of the United States housing bubble.
