= National Stone, Sand & Gravel Association =

U.S. Trade association

The National Stone, Sand & Gravel Association is a professional trade association, with a membership of stone, sand, and gravel producers, as well as related equipment manufacturers and service providers. The companies they represent within the aggregates industry are responsible for the raw materials found in residential and commercial buildings, roads, bridges, and public works projects throughout the United States. The NSSGA was created in February 2001 when 2 large aggregate associations, the National Aggregates Association and the National Stone Association, merged.

In 2013, Michael W. Johnson was appointed the new President and CEO of NSSGA, a position he still held as of 2022. During his time as CEO, he launched new initiatives and revamped many of the governing by-laws dating back to the 2001 merger. He also was a leader in the industry’s lobbying campaign to defeat a commercial asbestos ban that had been proposed by Congress in 2020.

The NSSGA was an outspoken advocate leading up to Congress’ passage of the six-year transportation reauthorization bill in 2015. CEO Johnson, was quoted saying that the US is in need of a long-term and well-funded transportation bill.

In 2018, the NSSGA is continuing its advocacy work with a focus on growing committee structures and providing advocacy events, such as its annual legislative and policy forum in Washington, D.C.
