= Construction aggregate =

Coarse to fine grain rock materials used in concrete

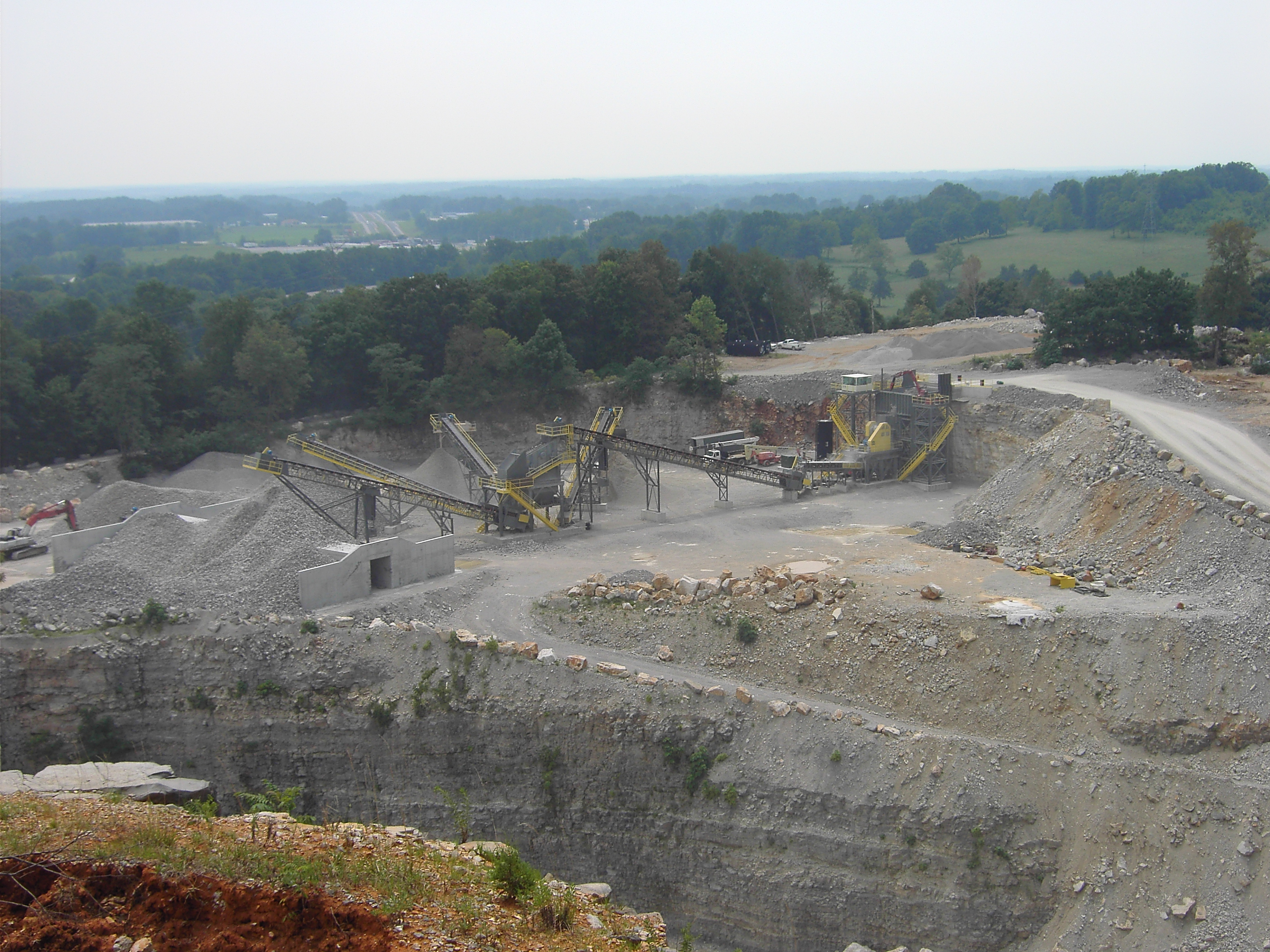
A limestone quarry in Tennessee, U.S.

Construction aggregate, or simply aggregate, is a broad category of coarse to medium-grained particulate material used in construction. Traditionally, it includes natural materials such as sand, gravel, and crushed stone. As with other types of aggregates, it is a component of composite materials, particularly concrete and asphalt. Aggregates are the most mined materials in the world, being a significant part of the 6 billion tons of concrete produced per year.

Aggregate serves as reinforcement to add strength to the resulting material. Due to the relatively high hydraulic conductivity as compared to most soil types, aggregates are widely used in drainage applications such as foundation and French drains, septic drain fields, retaining wall drains, and roadside edge drains. Aggregates are also used as base material under building foundations, roads and railroads (aggregate base). It has predictable, uniform properties, preventing differential settling under the road or building.

Aggregates are also used as a low-cost extender that binds with more expensive bitumen to form asphalt concrete or with Portland cement to form concrete.

Self-binding aggregate refers to angular crushed material (quarrystone rubble) comprising a mixture of finer and coarser particles that interlock after being compacted. More recently, recycled concrete, steel and carbon fibres as well as geosynthetic materials have also been used as aggregates.

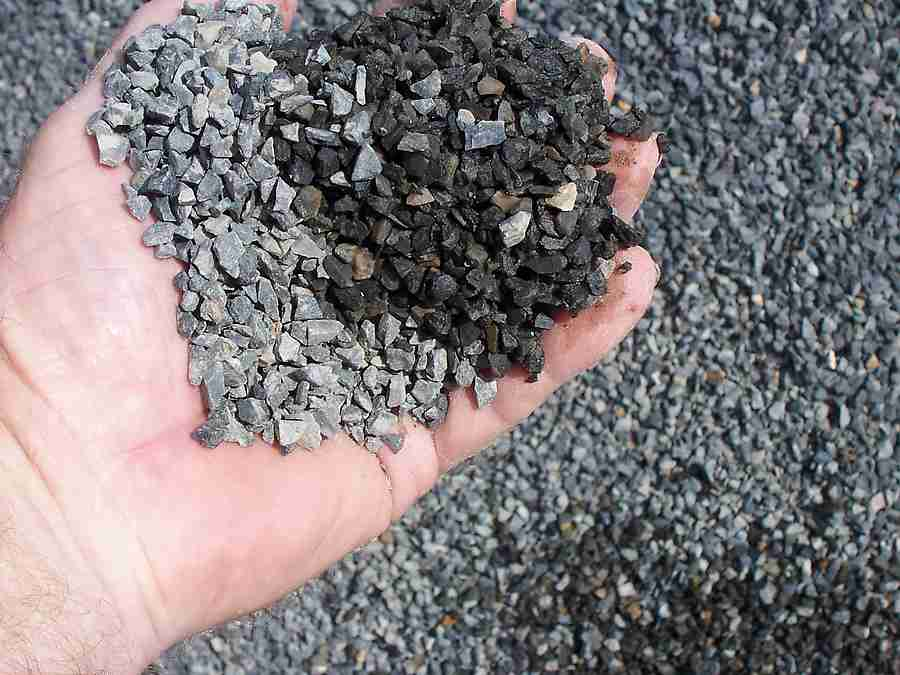
10 mm graded crushed basalt rock or aggregate, for use in concrete, called "blue metal" in Australia

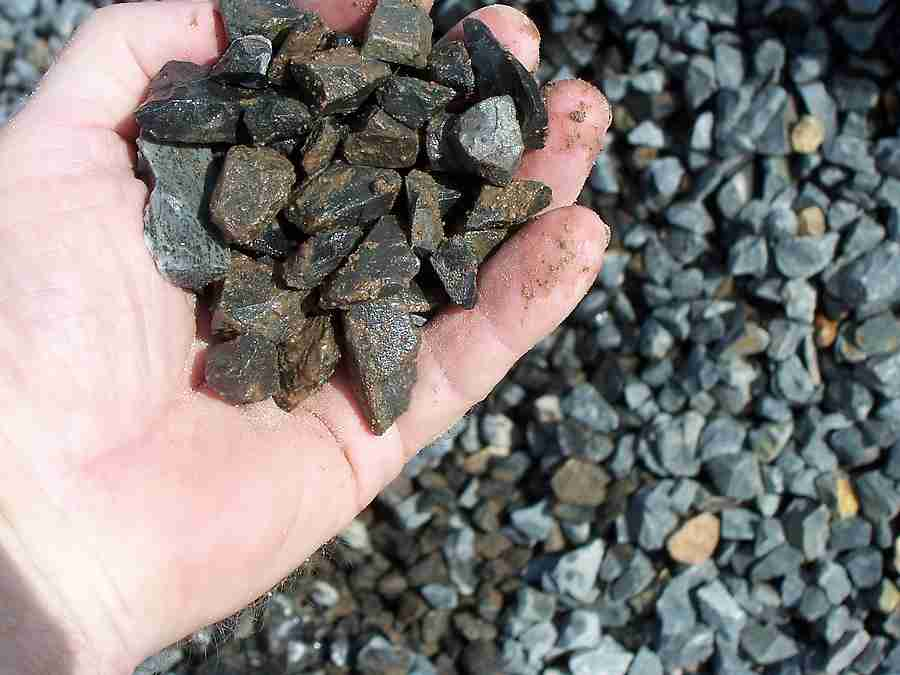
20 mm graded aggregate

== Sources ==
Sources for these basic materials can be grouped into three main areas: mining of mineral aggregate deposits, including sand, gravel, and stone; use of waste slag from the manufacture of iron and steel; and recycling of concrete, which is itself chiefly manufactured from mineral aggregates. In addition, there are some (minor) materials that are used as specialty lightweight aggregates: clay, pumice, perlite, and vermiculite. Other minerals include:

- basalt
- dolomite
- granite
- gravel
- limestone
- sand
- sandstone

== Specifications ==
In Europe, sizing ranges are specified as d/D, where the d shows the smallest and D shows the largest square mesh grating through which the particles can pass. Application-specific preferred sizings are covered in European Standard EN 13043 for road construction, EN 13383 for larger armour stone, EN 12620 for concrete aggregate, EN 13242 for base layers of road construction, and EN 13450 for railway ballast.

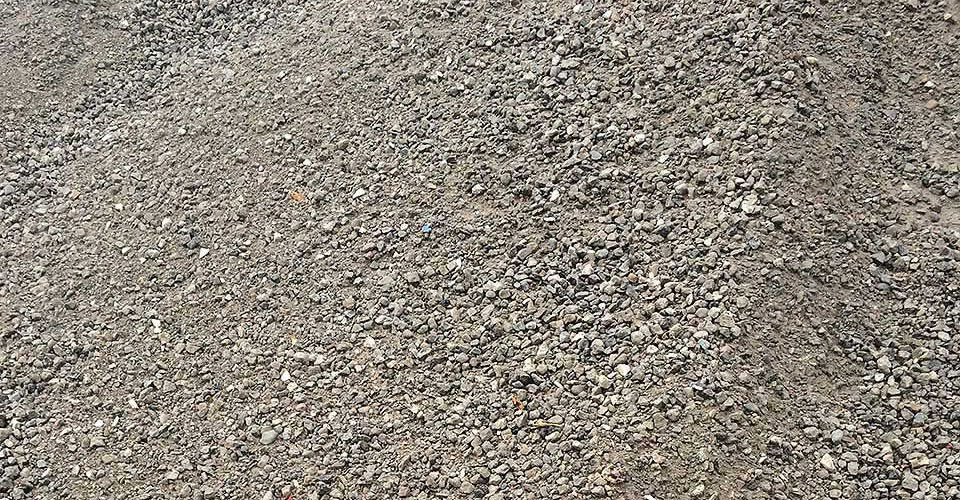
Class 3 road base

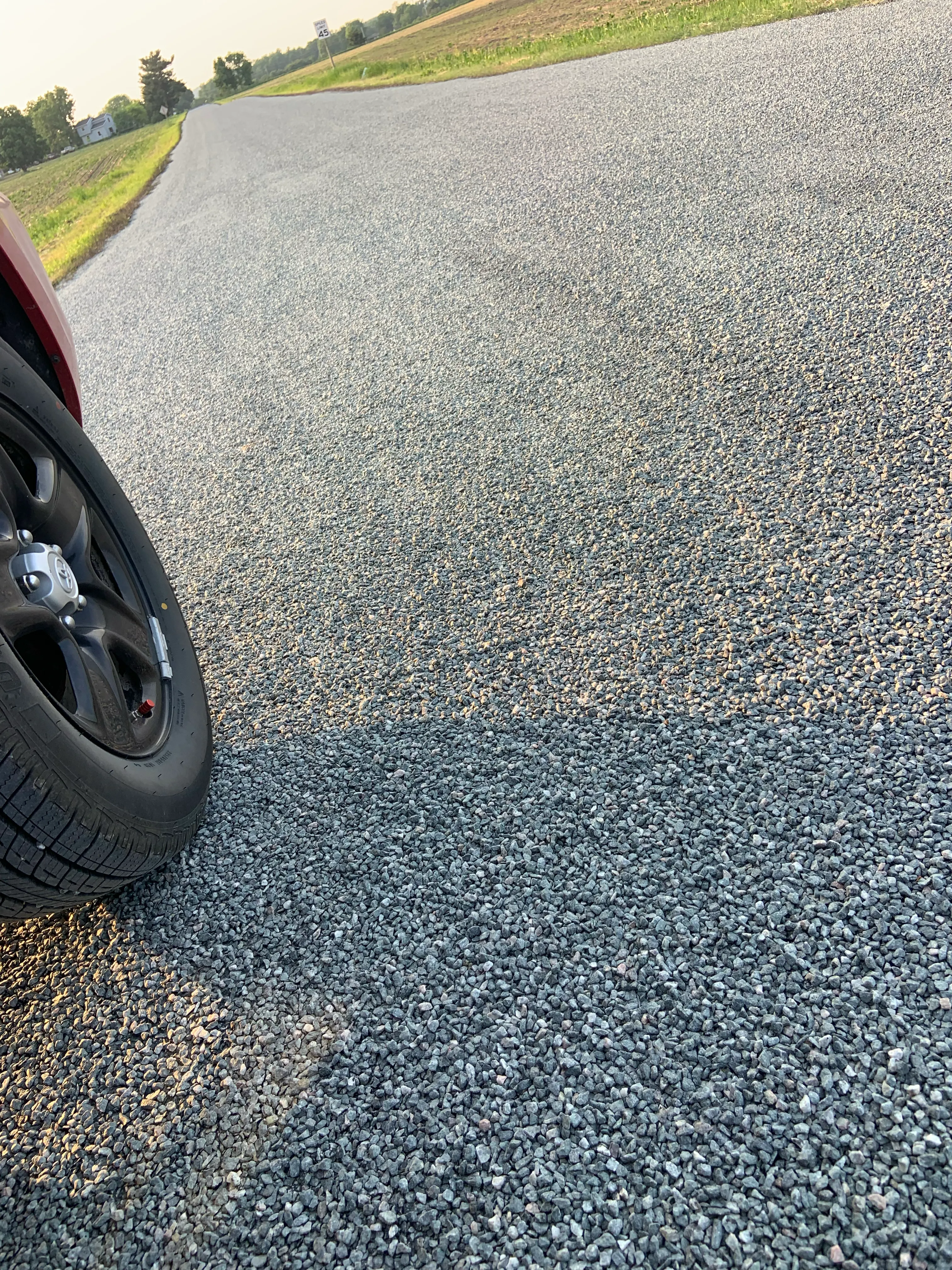
Chipseal aggregate on Ellsworth Road in Tomah, Wisconsin

The American Society for Testing and Materials publishes an exhaustive listing of specifications including ASTM D 692 and ASTM D 1073 for various construction aggregate products, which, by their individual design, are suitable for specific construction purposes. These products include specific types of coarse and fine aggregate designed for such uses as additives to asphalt and concrete mixes, as well as other construction uses. State transportation departments further refine aggregate material specifications in order to tailor aggregate use to the needs and available supply in their particular locations.

Aggregate base is typically composed of crushed rock capable of passing through a 20-millimetre (3/4 in) rock screen. The component particles will vary in size from 20 mm down to dust. The material can be made of virgin (newly mined) rock, or of recycled asphalt and concrete. Base is used as a base course in roadways, as a base course for cement pads and foundations, and as backfill material for underground pipelines and other underground utilities. The base course is the sub-base layer of an asphalt roadway. Generally consisting of larger grade aggregate, spread and compacted to provide a stable base for further layers of aggregates or asphalt pavement. Aggregate base course is often referred to as ABC.

== History ==
People have used sand and stone for foundations for thousands of years. Significant refinement of the production and use of aggregate occurred during the Roman Empire, which used aggregate to build its vast network of roads and aqueducts. The invention of concrete, which was essential to architecture utilizing arches, created an immediate, permanent demand for construction aggregates.

Vitruvius writes in De architectura:

Economy denotes the proper management of materials and of site, as well as a thrifty balancing of cost and common sense in the construction of works. This will be observed if, in the first place, the architect does not demand things which cannot be found or made ready without great expense. For example: it is not everywhere that there is plenty of pit-sand, rubble, fir, clear fir, and marble... Where there is no pit sand, we must use the kinds washed up by rivers or by the sea... and other problems we must solve in similar ways.

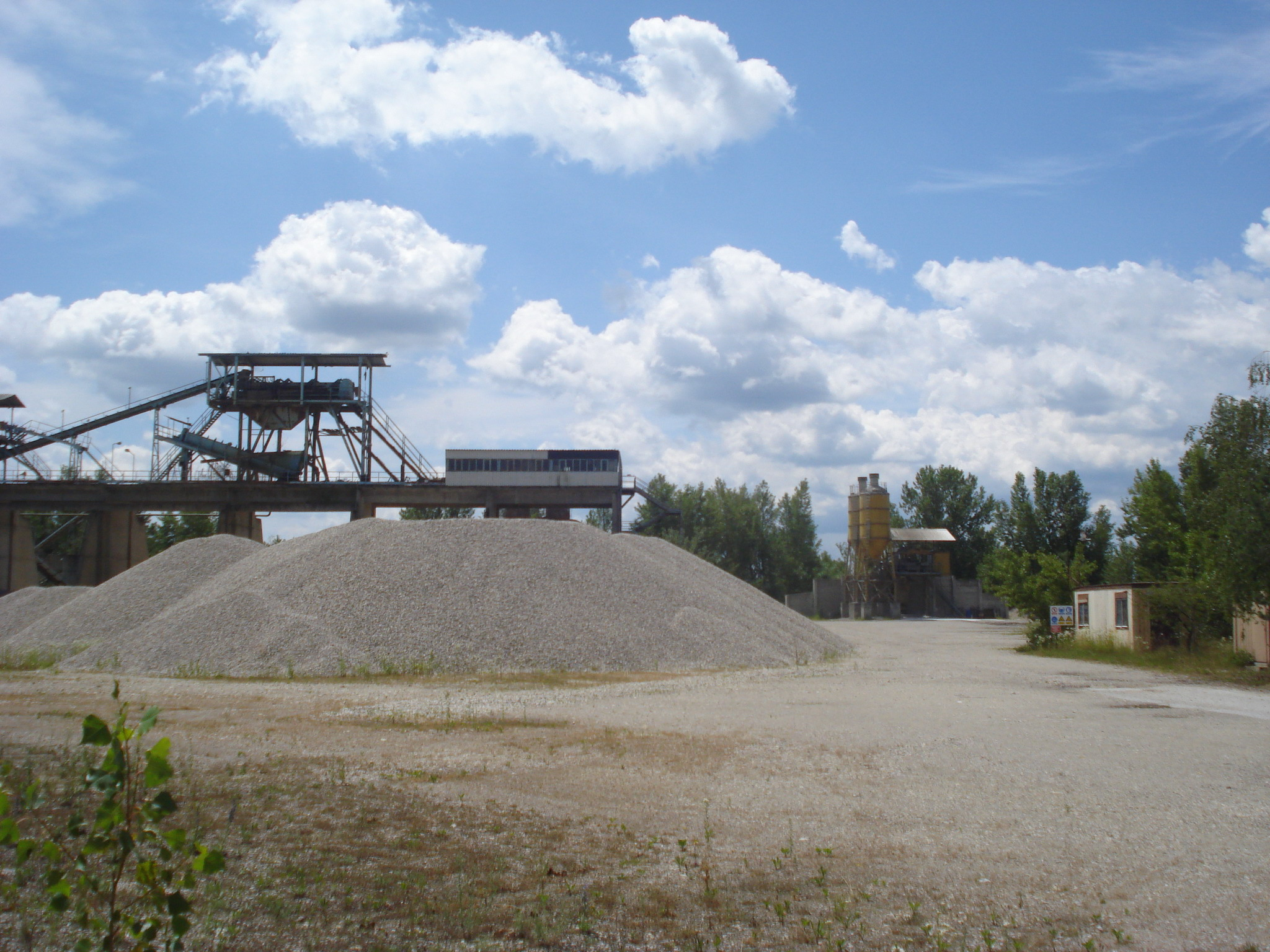
A gravel and sand extraction facility in Međimurje County, Croatia

== Modern production ==
The advent of modern blasting methods enabled the development of quarries, which are now used throughout the world, wherever competent bedrock deposits of aggregate quality exist. In many places, good limestone, granite, marble or other quality stone bedrock deposits do not exist. In these areas, natural sand and gravel are mined for use as aggregate. Where neither stone, nor sand and gravel, are available, construction demand is usually satisfied by shipping in aggregate by rail, barge or truck. Additionally, demand for aggregates can be partially satisfied through the use of slag and recycled concrete. However, the available tonnages and lesser quality of these materials prevent them from being a viable replacement for mined aggregates on a large scale.

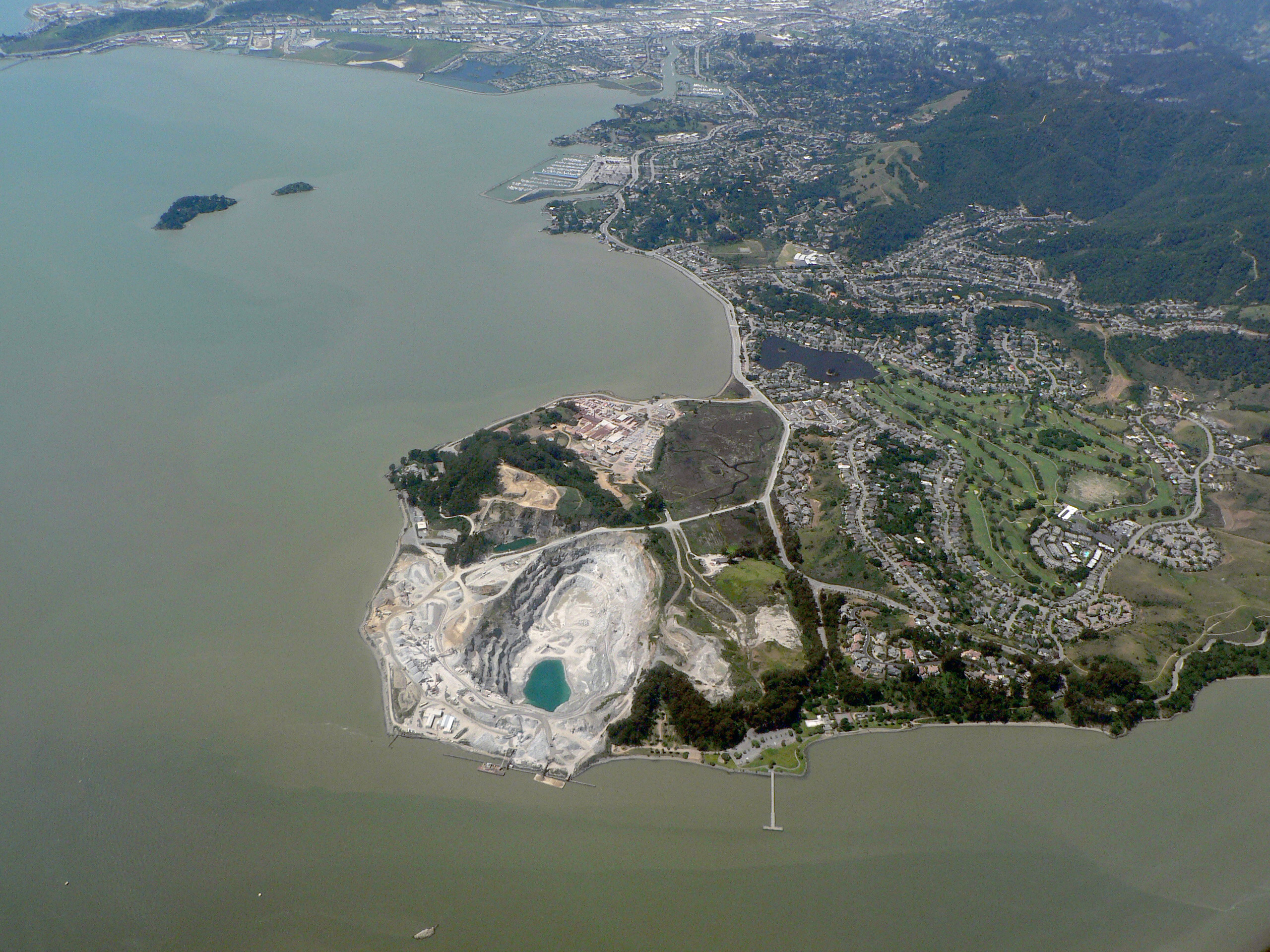
Over 1 million tons annually are mined from this quarry near San Francisco.

Large stone quarry and sand and gravel operations exist near virtually all population centers due to the high cost of transportation relative to the low value of the product. Trucking aggregate more than 40 kilometers is typically uneconomical. These are capital-intensive operations, utilizing large earth-moving equipment, belt conveyors, and machines specifically designed for crushing and separating various sizes of aggregate, to create distinct product stockpiles.

According to the USGS, 2006 U.S. crushed stone production was 1.72 billion tonnes valued at $13.8 billion (compared to 1.69 billion tonnes valued at $12.1 billion in 2005), of which limestone was 1,080 million tonnes valued at $8.19 billion from 1,896 quarries, granite was 268 million tonnes valued at $2.59 billion from 378 quarries, trap rock was 148 million tonnes valued at $1.04 billion from 355 quarries, and the balance other kinds of stone from 729 quarries. Limestone and granite are also produced in large amounts as dimension stone. The great majority of crushed stone is moved by heavy truck from the quarry/plant to the first point of sale or use. According to the USGS, 2006 U.S. sand and gravel production was 1.32 billion tonnes valued at $8.54 billion (compared to 1.27 billion tonnes valued at $7.46 billion in 2005), of which 264 million tonnes valued at $1.92 billion was used as concrete aggregates. The great majority of this was again moved by truck, instead of by electric train.

Currently, total U.S. aggregate demand by final market sector was 30%–35% for non-residential building (offices, hotels, stores, manufacturing plants, government and institutional buildings, and others), 25% for highways, and 25% for housing.

== Recycled materials ==
Recycled material such as blast furnace and steel furnace slag can be used as aggregate or partly substitute for Portland cement. Blast furnace and steel slag is either air-cooled or water-cooled. Air-cooled slag can be used as aggregate. Water-cooled slag produces sand-sized glass-like particles (granulated). Adding free lime to the water during cooling gives granulated slag hydraulic cementitious properties.

In 2006, according to the USGS, air-cooled blast furnace slag sold or used in the U.S. was 7.3 million tonnes valued at $49 million, granulated blast furnace slag sold or used in the U.S. was 4.2 million tonnes valued at $318 million, and steel furnace slag sold or used in the U.S. was 8.7 million tonnes valued at $40 million. Air-cooled blast furnace slag sales in 2006 were for use in road bases and surfaces (41%), asphaltic concrete (13%), ready-mixed concrete (16%), and the balance for other uses. Granulated blast furnace slag sales in 2006 were for use in cementitious materials (94%), and the balance for other uses. Steel furnace slag sales in 2006 were for use in road bases and surfaces (51%), asphaltic concrete (12%), for fill (18%), and the balance for other uses.

Recycled glass aggregate crushed to a small size is substituted for many construction and utility projects in place of pea gravel or crushed rock. Glass aggregate is not dangerous to handle. It can be used as pipe bedding—placed around sewer, storm water or drinking water pipes to transfer weight from the surface and protect the pipe. Another common use is as fill to bring the level of a concrete floor even with a foundation. Use of glass aggregate helps close the loop in glass recycling in many places where glass cannot be smelted into new glass.

Aggregates themselves can be recycled as aggregates. Recyclable aggregate tends to be concentrated in urban areas. The supply of recycled aggregate depends on physical decay and demolition of structures. Mobile recycling plants eliminate the cost of transporting the material to a central site. The recycled material is typically of variable quality.

Many aggregate products are recycled for other industrial purposes. Contractors save on disposal costs and less aggregate is buried or piled and abandoned. In Bay City, Michigan, for example, a recycle program exists for unused products such as mixed concrete, block, brick, gravel, pea stone, and other used materials. The material is crushed to provide subbase for roads and driveways, among other purposes.

According to the USGS in 2006, 2.9 million tonnes of Portland cement concrete (including aggregate) worth $21.9 million was recycled, and 1.6 million tonnes of asphalt concrete (including aggregate) worth $11.8 million was recycled, both by crushed stone operations. Much more of both materials are recycled by construction and demolition firms not included in the USGS survey. For sand and gravel, the survey showed that 4.7 million tonnes of cement concrete valued at $32.0 million was recycled, and 6.17 million tonnes of asphalt concrete valued at $45.1 million was recycled. Again, more of both materials are recycled by construction and demolition firms not in this USGS survey. The Construction Materials Recycling Association indicates that there are 325 million tonnes of recoverable construction and demolition materials produced annually.

=== Organic materials ===
Many geosynthetic aggregates are made from recycled materials. Recyclable plastics can be reused in aggregates. For example, Ring Industrial Group's EZflow product lines are produced with geosynthetic aggregate pieces that are more than 99.9% recycled polystyrene. This polystyrene, otherwise destined for a landfill, is gathered, melted, mixed, reformulated and expanded to create low density aggregates that maintain high strength properties under compressive loads. Such geosynthetic aggregates replace conventional gravel while simultaneously increasing porosity, increasing hydraulic conductivity and eliminating the fine dust "fines" inherent to gravel aggregates which otherwise serve to clog and disrupt the operation of many drainage applications.

Several groups have attempted to use minced tires as part of concrete aggregate. The result is tougher than regular concrete, because it can bend instead of breaking under pressure. However, tires reduce compressive strength partially because the cement bonds poorly with the rubber. Pores in the rubber fill with water when the concrete is mixed, but become voids as the concrete sets. One group put the concrete under pressure as it sets, reducing pore volumes.

=== Recycled aggregates in the UK ===
Recycled aggregate in the UK results from the processing of construction material. To ensure the aggregate is inert, it is manufactured from material tested and characterized under European Waste Codes.

In 2008, 210 million tonnes of aggregate were produced including 67 million tonnes of recycled product, according to the Quarry Products Association. The Waste and Resource Action Programme has produced a Quality Protocol for the regulated production of recycled aggregates.

== See also ==
- Aggregate (composite), Aggregate base
- Aggregate industry in the United States
- Alkali-aggregate reaction
- Alkali–silica reaction
- Concrete
- Crushed stone
- Dimension stone – stone recycling and reuse
- Hoggin
- Interfacial transition zone (ITZ)
- Marble
- Pozzolanic reaction
- Road metal
- Saturated-surface-dry
- Tumble finishing
