= Environmental Product Declaration =

Environmental certification program

An Environmental Product Declaration (EPD) is a form of environmental declaration that quantifies environmental information about the life cycle of a product. This can enable comparisons between products fulfilling the same function. The methodology to produce an EPD is based on product life cycle assessment (LCA), following the ISO 14040 series of international standards, and must be verified by an independent third-party before publication.

Companies may produce EPDs to communicate the environmental impact of their products or services, differentiate their products on the market, and demonstrate a commitment to limiting environmental impacts. EPDs are a transparency tool and do not certify whether a product can be considered environmentally friendly or not. They are primarily intended to facilitate business-to-business transactions, although they may also benefit environmentally motivated retail consumers when choosing goods or services.

== Content ==
The content of an EPD is dependent on the category of the product under study and the methodology, called the product category rules (PCR), used. Typically, an EPD will contain a brief overview of the company, product and production methods, and environmental impact data for the product. Text and illustrations are intended to be easily understood, and the environmental impact information can be found in one or two tables. Input data, LCA calculations and any commercially-sensitive information are included in a background report, which is reviewed by the third-party verifier but not typically published.

Some manufacturers include additional information about innovative production processes. For example, a 38-page EPD for a pasta product contains sections on the brand and product, environmental performance calculations, information on sustainable wheat cultivation, milling, packaging production, pasta production, distribution, cooking, packaging end-of-life, and summary tables for environmental impact in different markets.

== Digital EPDs ==
EPDs are available directly from manufacturers or hosted on EPD databases, which are typically owned by the programme operators through which EPDs are produced, verified and published. The usefulness of data stored within an EPD is proportional to how easily it can be accessed and analysed; however, database owners have been slow to modernise platforms, and most require users to download individual PDFs in order to view and compare the data.

Progress has been made to improve the design of EPDs for machine-readability and indexing purposes for the construction industry through the EN ISO 22057 standard, ILCD+EPD and openEPD formats. EN ISO 22057 was created by ISO/TC 59/SC 17 Sustainability in buildings and civil engineering works based on the BIM data templates concept and it is compatible with the EPDs developed according to EN 15804 and ISO 21930. openEPD has been designed in a way that EPD data can be accessed via an API, promoting the integration of product-specific data into industrial design and stock inventory software. Some limitations for machine-interpretability of digital EPDs have been identified to use EPDs at asset level, in order to maximise their use and reduce environmental impacts. The InData network and other groups are working on improving these formats.

== Framework for creating an EPD ==
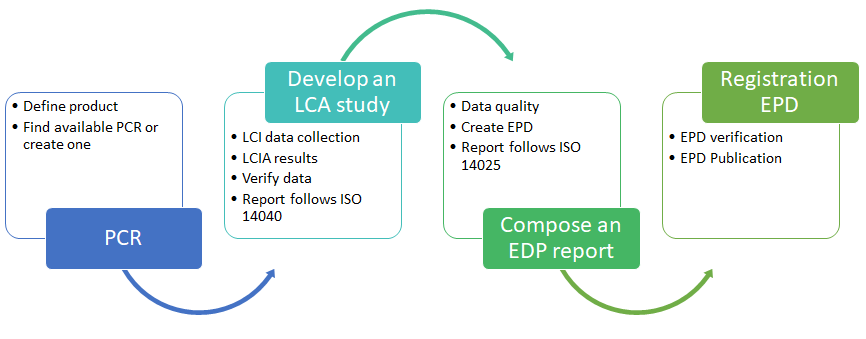
Framework for creating an EPD

The first step in creating an EPD is defining the product, using the appropriate Product Category Rules (PCR). A Life Cycle Inventory (LCI) for the LCA must be verified and from reliable sources (for example, from a manufacturing facility). A Life Cycle Environmental Impact Analysis (LCIA) is performed by an LCA expert using software and a variety of assessment tools. The EPD is delivered as a document or report following a series of verification reviews; it is then ready for registration and publication.

== Product category rules ==
PCRs are specific rules and requirements that set out how the LCA of a product should be carried out and the results disclosed. They provide guidance that, in theory, enables fair comparison among products of the same category.

Criteria contained in a PCR include: a description of the product category, the goal of the LCA, functional units, system boundaries, cut-off criteria, allocation rules, environmental impact categories, information on the product's use phase, required units, LCA calculation procedures, requirements for data quality assessment, and other relevant information. The goal of PCRs is to help develop EPDs for products that are comparable to others within a product category, such as construction products. ISO 14025 establishes the procedure for developing PCRs and the required content of a PCR, as well as requirements for comparability.

Sub-PCRs, or complementary-PCRs, add additional rules and guidelines for specific product sub-categories and are intended to be used in conjunction with a core PCR. For example, a manufacturer producing an EPD for a concrete product may use EN 15804+A2, which provides core rules for construction products, plus EN 16757, which provides additional rules for concrete and concrete elements.

== Challenges ==
LCA studies can vary in terms of assumptions and methodological choices made during the LCA and consequently, the results for products that fulfil the same function may not be consistent with one another.

Some nations have a high number of EPDs for construction products, while others have a limited quantity. In regions with fewer EPDs, the existence of multiple operator programs is noted as a factor that can hinder the comparability of results.

A key issue with EPDs is that they inherit the inconsistencies and problems of the LCA data they rely on. A recent study highlights this by identifying 27 significant challenges in LCA, categorized into seven groups, including Data Paucity, Resource-intensive, and Data Integrity. The most prominent issues are problems with data availability and quality, a lack of transparency in existing databases, the absence of country-specific inventory data, and a general lack of understanding regarding data uncertainty and awareness of LCA itself.

- Duplication of PCRs for similar product categories in different regions. PCRs developed in under the European Committee for Standardization framework may differ from PCRs developed under ISO framework, reducing the comparability of EPDs for like-products from different regions. This may also increase administrative burden for manufacturers operating in multiple regions, which may be required to produce EPDs using different PCRs to align with heterogeneous reporting requirements.
- Interpretation of the rules and requirements in PCRs can lead to variances in methodological choices and data reporting within an LCA, even where the same PCR is used. If the choices made are justifiable, this may not be flagged during the verification process.
- Secondary databases can offer significantly different emission values for the same process, activity or input (e.g., the embodied emissions of 1 metric tonne of coking coal). PCRs permit the use of secondary data for emission flows, out of the control of the manufacturer creating the EPD (e.g., emissions from the upstream supply chain), and LCA practitioners have the choice of several, commercially operated databases. This variance decreases the comparability of data in EPDs.
- Lack of rigorous third-party review: Inconsistency in the interpretation of the PCRs means that various accounting practices can be reasonably justified within EPDs for similar products, leading to different outcomes that are not comparable.
- Financial Constraints: Carrying out a detailed LCA and publishing an EPD can be cost-intensive.

== Construction sector ==
EN 15804
- Sustainability of construction works - Environmental product declarations - Core rules for the product category of construction products
- Organization: CEN
- Committee: CEN/TC 350 - Sustainability of construction works
- Domain: Core product category rules (PCR) for Type III environmental declarations for any construction product and construction service.
- Website: https://standards.cencenelec.eu/dyn/www/f?p=205:110:0::::FSP_PROJECT:74037&cs=1DB6B38866B73011ED991761FF1B811AC

The European Committee for Standardization (CEN) standard, EN 15804:2012+A2:2019/AC:2021, is a common PCR for construction materials. Other complementary standards, for example, for environmental building assessment (EN 15978), or PCR for Electrical and Electonical products EN 50693 (EN IEC 63366) are also published by the same Technical Committee.

In order to enhance harmonization, the main Programme Operators for EPD verification in the construction sector created ECO Platform, with members from various European countries.

The Programme Operators approved to issue EPDs with the ECO Platform verified logo are:

- Asociación Española de Normalización y Certificación (AENOR) - GlobalEPD Program (Spain)
- Bau EPD GmbH (Austria)
- EPD International AB - International EPD System (Sweden)
- Institut Bauen und Umwelt e.V. (IBU) (Germany)
- Building Research Establishment Limited (BRE) (United Kingdom)
- EPD Danmark (Danmark)
- Instytut Techniki Budowlanej (Poland)
- Association HQE tio - FDES INIES (France)
- PEP Ecopassport (France)
- ICMQ S.p.a. - EPDItaly (Italy)
- DAPHabitat - DAPHabitat System (Portugal)
- EPD Ireland (The Irish Green Building Council)

The ECO Platform also includes the following trade associations:

- Construction Products Europe
- Ceramie Unie ASBL
- Eurima AiSBL

Some Programme Operators are under bilateral mutual recognition agreements, including IBU (Germany), EPD International (Sweden), PEP Ecopassport (France) and AENOR GlobalEPD (Spain).

EPD Hub is a widely used global EPD program operator in compliance with international standards, including ISO 14025, EN 15804+A2, ISO 21930, EN 50693, ISO 14067, and others. It is a member of ECO Platform and Group of Notified Bodies — Sector Group on Environmental Sustainability (SH03).

The following programme operators are based in North America and Asia, and typically develop PCRs based on ISO 21930:2017.

ISO 21930
- Sustainability in buildings and civil engineering works — Core rules for environmental product declarations of construction products and services
- Status: Published
- Organization: ISO
- Committee: ISO/TC 59/SC 17
- Base standards: ISO 14025, ISO 14040, ISO 14044
- Domain: Environmental impact of construction works
- Website: https://www.iso.org/standard/61694.html

=== North America ===
- SmartEPD (U.S. and Global)
- FP Innovations - EPD Program on Wood Products (Canada)
- NSF International (U.S.)
- The Sustainability Consortium (U.S.)
- UL Environment (U.S.)
- ASTM International (U.S.)
- ICC Evaluation Services (U.S.)
- National Ready Mixed Concrete Association (U.S.)
- SCS Global Services (U.S.)

=== Asia ===
- Japan Environmental Management Association for Industry (Japan)
- Korean Environmental Industry & Technology Institute (Korea)
- Environment and Development Foundation (Taiwan)

== See also ==
- Consumer protection
- Corporate social responsibility
- Eco-efficiency
- Ecolabel
