= H.R. 3329 (113th Congress) =

Proposed American legislation

- Long title: To enhance the ability of community financial institutions to foster economic growth and serve their communities, boost small businesses, increase individual savings, and for other purposes.
- Announced in: the 113th United States Congress
- Sponsored by: Rep. Blaine Luetkemeyer (R, MO-3)
- Number of co-sponsors: 4

Codification
- U.S.C. sections affected: 12 U.S.C. § 5371, 12 U.S.C. § 1841, 12 U.S.C. § 1467a
- Agencies affected: Federal Reserve Board of Governors

Legislative history
- Introduced in the House as H.R. 3329 by Rep. Blaine Luetkemeyer (R, MO-3) on October 23, 2013; Committee consideration by United States House Committee on Financial Services

The H.R. 3329 is a bill that would direct the Federal Reserve to revise certain regulations related to small bank holding companies (BHCs). Current regulations allow BHCs with assets of less than $500 million that satisfy other tests to incur higher amounts of debt than larger institutions in order to acquire other banks. H.R. 3329 would apply the less-stringent standard to more BHCs by raising the asset limit to $1 billion, and the bill would also allow savings and loan holding companies to qualify.

The bill was introduced into the United States House of Representatives during the 113th United States Congress.

== Background ==
In the United States, the Bank Holding Company Act of 1956 (12 U.S.C. § 1841(a)(2)(A) et seq.) broadly defines a bank holding company as "any company that has control over a bank". The law requires all bank-holding companies in the U.S. to register with the Board of Governors of the Federal Reserve System.

== Provisions of the bill ==
This summary is based largely on the summary provided by the Congressional Research Service, a public domain source.

The bill would direct the Board of Governors of the Federal Reserve System to publish in the Federal Register proposed revisions to the Small Bank Holding Company Policy Statement on Assessment of Financial and Managerial Factors applying such policy to bank holding companies and savings and loan holding companies having pro forma consolidated assets of less than $1 billion and which: (1) are not engaged in nonbanking activities involving significant leverage, and (2) do not have a significant amount of outstanding debt held by the general public.

The bill would retain the board's authority, however, to exclude either a bank holding company or a savings and loan holding company from such policy statement if exclusion is warranted for supervisory purposes.

== Congressional Budget Office report ==
This summary is based largely on the summary provided by the Congressional Budget Office, as ordered and reported by the House Committee on Financial Services on November 14, 2013. This is a public domain source.

H.R. 3329 would direct the Federal Reserve to revise specific regulations related to small bank holding companies (BHCs). Current rules allow BHCs with assets of less than $500 million that satisfy other tests to incur higher amounts of debt than larger institutions in order to acquire other banks. H.R. 3329 would apply the less-stringent standard to more BHCs by raising the asset limit to $1 billion, and the bill would also allow savings and loan holding companies to qualify.

The Congressional Budget Office (CBO) estimates that H.R. 3329 would have no significant budgetary effect because the agency expects that workloads for affected financial regulators (the Federal Reserve System, the Federal Deposit Insurance Corporation, and the Office of the Comptroller of the Currency among others) would not be significantly affected by the new requirements. Enacting H.R. 3329 would not affect direct spending or revenues; therefore, pay-as-you-go procedures do not apply.

H.R. 3329 contains no intergovernmental or private-sector mandates as defined in the Unfunded Mandates Reform Act and would not affect the budgets of state, local, or tribal governments.

== Procedural history ==
H.R. 3329 was introduced into the United States House of Representatives on October 23, 2013 by Rep. Blaine Luetkemeyer (R, MO-3). It was referred to the United States House Committee on Financial Services. The bill was scheduled to be voted on under suspension of the rules on May 6, 2014.

== Debate and discussion ==
The American Bankers Association (ABA) wrote a letter in support of H.R. 3329. The ABA said that the legislation "would provide much-needed regulatory relief for hundreds of community banks and thrifts." They argued that under an increased BHC threshold, "more banks and thrifts will qualify for coverage under the BHC and will be exempt from certain capital and regulatory guidelines that do not provide materially more safety and soundness protection in the context of these community banks."

The Independent Community Bankers of America (ICBA) also wrote a letter of "strong support" for H.R. 3329 to the House Financial Services Committee. The ICBA argued that "increasing the eligibility threshold to $1 billion to account for inflation, industry consolidation, and asset growth will help an additional 515 bank, and savings and loan holding companies raise capital for additional consumer and small business lending, leading to job creation and community development."

== See also ==
- List of bills in the 113th United States Congress
