= Non-bank subsidiary =

Non-bank subsidiaries are firms owned by bank holding companies that offer non-bank products and services, such as insurance and investment advice, and do not offer Federal Deposit Insurance Corporation insured banking products, such as checking and savings accounts. Such companies customarily use the term "banc" to define themselves—denoting that while being associated with a bank or holding company, they do not offer bank services.

A prominent example is the bank holding company Bank of America Corporation, whose bank subsidiary, Bank of America, N.A., offers bank services and products, while such non-bank subsidiaries as Bank of America Investment Services, Inc. and Bank of America Securities, as well as Bank of America Insurance Services, Inc., offer investment, insurance, and equities services under the Bank of America name.
