= Docusearch =

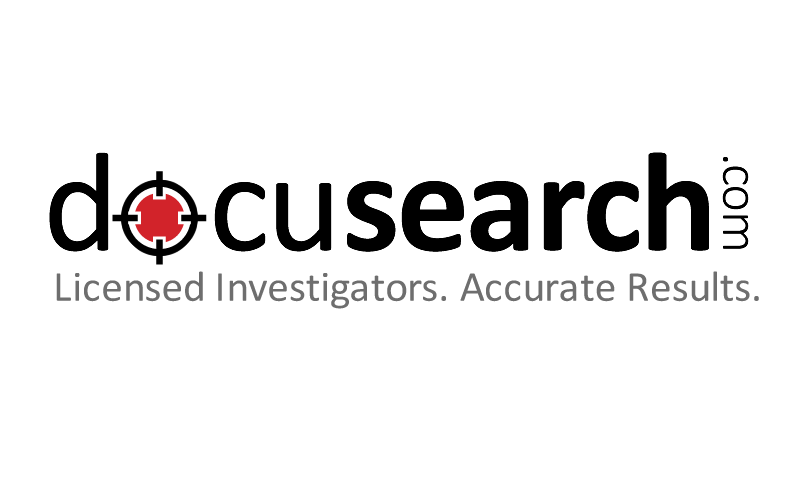
- Company type: Private
- Industry: Technology; Business intelligence
- Founded: 1996; 30 years ago
- Founders: Daniel S Cohn
- Headquarters: Boise, Idaho, US
- Area served: US
- Key people: Daniel S. Cohn, President
- Services: Data science; Analytics; Research
- Parent: Arcanum Investigations Inc
- Website: www.docusearch.com

Docusearch is an American private investigations company headquartered in Boise, Idaho. Docusearch, founded by Dan Cohn, was started in 1996. It is a subsidiary of Arcanum Investigations Inc. The company operates in all states of the US.

Docusearch first gained wide media attention during Remsburg v. Docusearch litigation in 1999. The case brought to New Hampshire’s Supreme Court ruling in 2003 about data brokers' legal duty and responsibility for selling private information.

== Overview ==
Docusearch was founded by private detective Dan Cohn in June 1996 in Boca Raton, Florida. The company later moved to Boise, Idaho, where it is now headquartered with satellite offices in Virginia and Maine. Docusearch's parent company is Arcanum Investigations, Inc. Though often misidentified as a data broker, Docusearch is a private investigation company and each inquiry is researched by-hand by a licensed investigator. However, unlike traditional private eyes, only investigative research services are provided with no field work and requested services and results are delivered through the company's website.

== Services ==
The company's stated core business is to provide investigative research to attorneys, insurance companies, government agencies, private investigators and private citizens who demonstrate a permissible purpose. Docusearch claimed areas of specialization include hidden asset research, license plate lookups, background checks, Social Security number finds, as well as criminal and public records. Through its investigative licensure, the company has contracted with 37 state motor vehicle agencies where license plate data is collected. Docusearch would be most familiar to attorneys and litigants for its ability to locate hidden bank and brokerage accounts, used for divorce litigation, child support, and judgment collection.

== Lawsuits ==
The company was a defendant in two notable civil lawsuits that subsequently helped to form stricter privacy laws and regulations in the US, in particular in the domain of online privacy protection.

=== Remsburg v. Docusearch ===
One of the most notable litigation was Remsburg v. Docusearch, related to Amy Boyer, a young woman murdered by her former classmate Liam Youens in 1999. According to a number of sources, Docusearch allegedly provided information to a stalker, who used that information to visit the victim’s place of employment, kill her, and then shot himself. The case was highly documented, and Docusearch was sued by the victim’s family with an Amicus Brief written by the Electronic Privacy Information Center. New Hampshire’s Supreme Court ruled in 2003 that data brokers have a legal duty to the people whose information they sell. “It was groundbreaking,” Citron said of the Docusearch case. “It said, Hey, data brokers, you should be forewarned that your business model puts people at risk for stalking and harassment and murder because you’re trafficking in personal information.” The lawsuit was settled before the trial.

=== DPPA Law ===
In a 2015 US Court of Appeals for the 2nd Circuit Driver’s Privacy Protection Act Case, Gordon v Softech, where Docusearch was involved as a defendant, a private citizen wrote down the license plate number of the car and used Docusearch to obtain the home address of the owner of the vehicle, the plaintiff. The plaintiff filed a lawsuit against the defendant, as well as the information brokers including Docusearch. The Court, presided by Judge Richard Berman found that the resellers are not strictly liable for the misuse of the information they sold to the defendant driver. However, the court found that the DPPA has a list of 14 exceptions that allow for certain uses of information.

=== Data privacy and pretexting issues ===
Several national publications have examined Docusearch when interpreting the federal Gramm-Leach-Blilely Act, which made it illegal to obtain financial information under false pretenses, such as by impersonating an account holder on the phone — a phenomenon commonly known as pretexting. As Atlanta Journal Constitution noted: "There is no pretexting, the website says. It also states that anyone who orders an asset search will be interviewed prior to the search being conducted." The company’s president, Dan Cohn, claimed that most of his customers are attorneys or private investigators who don’t have his resources. He declined to discuss his process for finding bank accounts except to say he does it legally and he believes he performs an important service. “I get where the public says, ‘That’s horrible. How can he find out personal information that’s supposed to be private?’” he said. “But there’s a lot of good that comes from it. Otherwise, people would go around accruing debt, not paying judgments, and there would be no recourse.”

When referring to Docusearch in his Senate Judiciary testimony, Robert Douglas, CEO of Privacy Today stated, “Far too often as we grapple with the issue of balancing the privacy of Americans with the necessary and legitimate uses of American’s personal information the debate centers on the discussions of “data”, but not the lives behind the data”.

== See also ==
- Driver’s Privacy Protection Act (DPPA)
- Gramm-Leech-Bliley Act (GLB)
- Financial Privacy Laws in the US
- Pretexting (Federal Legislation)
- Electronic Privacy Information Center
- Judge Richard Berman (notable cases)
- American Journalist Adam Penenberg
