= Independent Community Bankers of America =

The Independent Community Bankers of America (ICBA) is the primary trade group for small U.S. banks. It represents approximately 5,000 small and mid-sized financial institutions that are commonly known as "community banks." The ICBA hosts conventions, publishes the monthly magazine ICBA Independent Banker and lobbies the United States Congress on issues relating to the banking industry.

The organization is headquartered in Washington, D.C., and maintains statewide chapters across the country. It was founded in 1930 and owns six subsidiaries: ICBA Bancard, ICBA Securities, ICBA Financial Services, ICBA Mortgage, ICBA Insurance Services and ICBA Reinsurance

== Advocacy ==
During financial reform attempts in the US, the ICBA has lobbied for:

- credit unions to not obtain a perceived competitive advantage;
- a loophole that would allow smaller banks to still choose their regulator—which is expected to result in those banks choosing the most lenient regulator.

== Legislation ==
On November 8, 2013, the ICBA published a letter in "strong support" of the bill To enhance the ability of community financial institutions to foster economic growth and serve their communities, boost small businesses, increase individual savings (H.R. 3329; 113th Congress). The bill would direct the Federal Reserve to revise certain regulations related to small bank holding companies (BHCs). Current regulations allow BHCs with assets of less than $500 million that satisfy other tests to incur higher amounts of debt than larger institutions in order to acquire other banks. H.R. 3329 would apply the less-stringent standard to more BHCs by raising the asset limit to $1 billion, and the bill also would allow savings and loan holding companies to qualify. The ICBA argued that "increasing the eligibility threshold to $1 billion to account for inflation, industry consolidation, and asset growth will help an additional 515 bank and savings and loan holding companies raise capital for additional consumer and small business lending, leading to job creation and community development."
