= Corruption in Andorra =

Overview of corruption in Andorra

While corruption in Andorra is not as widespread as in the cases of other countries, key issues remain in the principality. These include corrupt practices related to financial regulations and Andorra's financial system. Due to the Andorran banking secrecy law, the country became an attractive destination for illicit funds, fraud, and money laundering.

== Financial system and corruption ==
Incidences of corruption in Andorra are largely identified with the country's bank secrecy law. Individuals, companies, and organizations committing financial crimes use Andorran banks to evade taxes, hide money from other countries, and bypass internal law. Private actors have been found to be complicit in illicit financial activities such as the money laundering of illegal proceeds of international mafia operations as well as ill-gotten wealth of individuals and criminal groups. This is demonstrated in the case of a criminal network composed of former high-ranking Venezuelan officials who served under President Hugo Chavez. The group is being investigated for stealing more than $2.2 billion in public funds. In May 2023, Andorra froze more than $55 million in alleged bribes that were collected and stashed in the country by 21 members of the criminal network.

== Organized crime ==
Andorra's membership in the European Union does not guarantee a requirement to adhere to certain conventions that would have restricted an environment for fraud and corruption. For instance, the country is not obligated to join the EU's customs territory. This contributed to the existence of organized crimes in the country that commit money laundering, smuggling, fraud, and economic crimes. However, the number of these activities is of limited scale and criminal groups rarely use corruption or bribery to co-opt civil servants or law enforcement officials.

== Judicial appointments ==
The country's judiciary is generally seen as independent and free from external pressures including the government. However, there are calls for more participation of judges and magistrates in the selection of the Andorran Higher Council of Justice, which is composed of judges selected by the two co-princes, the speaker of the parliament, and the prime minister. According to the Council of Europe’s Group of States Against Corruption (GRECO), this system exposes these high-level officials to potential conflicts of interest – that they are more inclined to rule in favor of those political figures who appointed them.

== Anti-corruption measures ==
Presently, corruption in Andorra is not of significant concern and this has been achieved through a number of initiatives. These include financial sector reforms, which aimed at combatting abuses of the country's banking system, particularly those that could support domestic and transnational corruption. For instance, in 2019, the parliament passed a law that provided safeguards against money laundering and terrorist financing. This has been confirmed by international institutions such as GRECO which stated that Andorra has made progress in preventing corruption, particularly, according to its recommendations. GRECO, however, noted that the country still needs reforms in key areas such as integrity checks for appointed officials and the regulation of special relationship personnel. Both of these are seen to aggravate risks of conflicts of interest.
