= Tokyo Gas =

Japanese natural gas utility company

Tokyo Gas Co., Ltd.

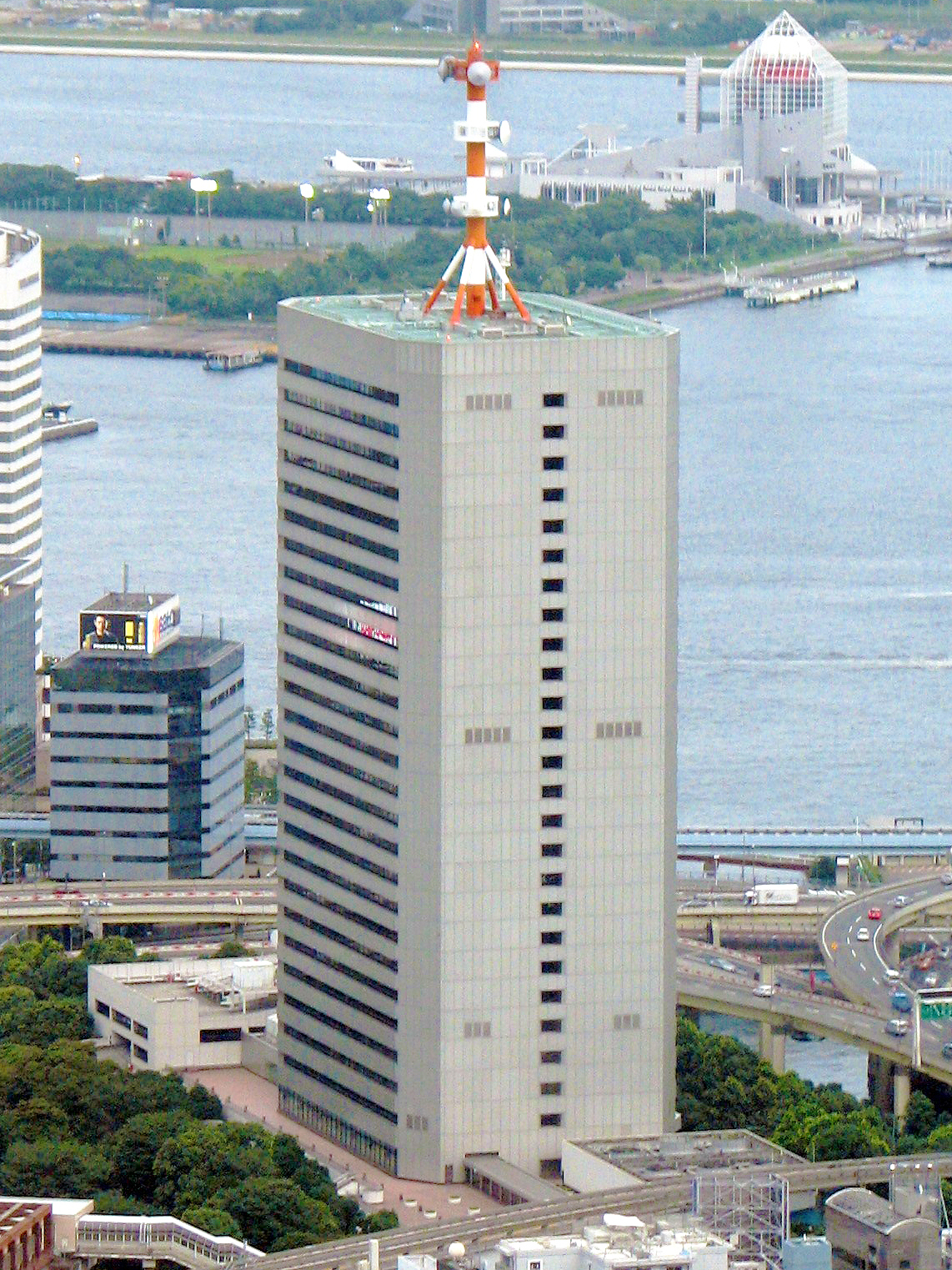
- Native name: 東京瓦斯株式会社
- Romanized name: Tōkyō Gasu Kabushiki-gaisha
- Company type: Public (K.K.)
- Traded as: TYO: 9531; NAG: 9531; Nikkei 225 Component
- Industry: Energy
- Founded: 1 October 1885; 140 years ago
- Headquarters: Minato, Tokyo, Japan
- Area served: Tokyo, Kanagawa, Saitama, Chiba, Ibaraki, Tochigi, Gunma, Yamanashi, Nagano
- Key people: SASAYAMA Shinichi (President and CEO) In this Japanese name, the surname is SASAYAMA.
- Services: Production, supply and sale of city gas Supply and sale of gas appliances, and related construction Construction for supply of city gas Energy services Supply of electricity
- Revenue: ▲¥1,535,242 million (FY 2011)
- Operating income: ▲¥122,451 million (FY2011)
- Net income: ▲¥95,467 million (FY2011)
- Total assets: ▲¥1,829,661 million (FY2011)
- Number of employees: 16,832 (2013)
- Website: tokyo-gas.co.jp

Tokyo Gas Co., Ltd. (東京瓦斯(ガス)株式会社, Tōkyō Gasu Kabushiki-gaisha; TYO: 9531), founded in 1885, is the primary provider of natural gas to the main cities of Tokyo, Kanagawa, Saitama, Chiba, Ibaraki, Tochigi, Gunma, Yamanashi, and Nagano. As of 2012, Tokyo Gas is the largest natural gas utility in Japan.

== Timeline ==
- October 1, 1885, Tokyo Gas was founded by Shibusawa Eiichi and Asano Sōichirō by acquiring business of Tokyo Prefecture Gas Bureau.
- 1912, Tokyo Gas merged with Chiyoda Gas.
- 1913, Tokyo Gas merged with Kawasaki Gas.
- 1944, Tokyo Gas acquired business of Yokohama City Gas Bureau.
- May 2016, Tokyo Gas merged with Chiba Gas, Tsukuba Gakuen Gas Corporation, and Miho Gas.
- December 2023, Tokyo Gas acquired a US-based natural gas producer, Rockcliff Energy, from Quantum Energy Partners for $2.7 billion.
