= Randy Neugebauer =

American politician (born 1949)

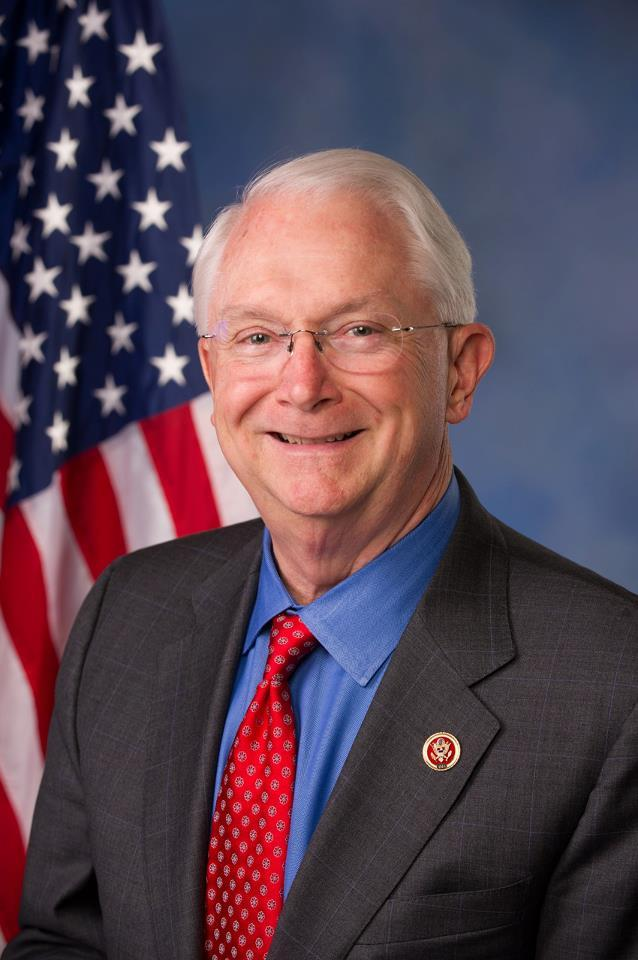
- Official portrait, 2013

Member of the U.S. House of Representatives from Texas's 19th district
- In office June 3, 2003 – January 3, 2017 (Note: Neugebauer's official service begins on the date of the special election, while he was not sworn in until June 5, 2003.)
- Preceded by: Larry Combest
- Succeeded by: Jodey Arrington

Personal details
- Born: Robert Randolph Neugebauer; December 24, 1949 (age 76) St. Louis, Missouri, U.S.
- Party: Republican
- Spouse: Dana Collins
- Children: 2
- Education: Texas Tech University, Lubbock (BBA)
- Neugebauer's voice Neugebauer honoring Rusty Ladd, a deceased Lubbock County judge. Recorded November 16, 2011

Robert Randolph Neugebauer (born December 24, 1949) is an American politician who was the U.S. representative for Texas's 19th congressional district, having served from a special election in 2003 to 2017. He is a member of the Republican Party. The district includes a large swath of West Texas, including Lubbock and Abilene. According to a 2011 survey by the National Journal, Neugebauer was "the most conservative" member of the House.

On September 17, 2015, Neugebauer announced he would not seek reelection to an eighth term in 2016.

== Early life, education and career ==
Neugebauer was born in St. Louis, Missouri, and reared in Lubbock. His father was an insurance salesman and his mother a real estate agent and interior designer. He has two brothers, Jon and Bradley, and a sister, Virginia Volpe. When Randy was nine years old, his parents divorced, and his father died in 1985 after remarrying. In 1963, his mother married Joe W. Smith, a bank manager. Neugebauer graduated from Coronado High School and later from Texas Tech University in 1972 with a Bachelor of Business Administration in accounting from the College of Business Administration (now Rawls College of Business).

Like his mother, Neugebauer has long been involved in the real estate business, having served as president of the development company Lubbock Land before his election to Congress. He is a former president of the Texas Association of Builders from 1996 to 1997.

== Early political career ==
From 1992 to 1998, Neugebauer was a Lubbock city councilman. He was mayor pro tempore from 1994 to 1996. While involved in Lubbock government, Neugebauer worked to reduce taxes and to privatize municipal services.

== U.S. House of Representatives ==
=== Committee assignments ===
- Committee on Agriculture
  - Subcommittee on General Farm Commodities and Risk Management
  - Subcommittee on Livestock, Dairy, and Poultry
- Committee on Financial Services
  - Subcommittee on Capital Markets and Government Sponsored Enterprises
  - Subcommittee on Oversight and Investigations (Chair)
- Committee on Science, Space and Technology
  - Subcommittee on Energy and Environment
  - Subcommittee on Technology and Innovation
- Congressional Hispanic Conference (associate member)
- Tea Party Caucus

=== Caucus memberships ===
- Congressional Constitution Caucus

=== Party leadership ===
- Republican Study Committee

=== "Baby Killer" remark ===
On March 21, 2010, during the debate in the House of Representatives of the Patient Protection and Affordable Care Act, Neugebauer yelled out "Baby killer!" The remark was believed to have been directed at Representative Bart Stupak of Michigan, a leader of the anti-abortion Democrats in the House, who was discussing a motion filed by the Republicans. While immediate inquiries began to determine who shouted the words, more than 12 hours later, on March 22, 2010, Neugebauer publicly identified himself as the person, apologized for the incident and argued that his words were "It's a baby killer", referring to the bill, not Stupak himself.

However, reporters and others in the room insisted Neugebauer precisely shouted "Baby killer!", referring to Stupak. Stupak said that he does not "buy" Neugebauer's description of the outburst, said his words were "very clear", and believes Neugebauer should apologize for his remark on the floor of the US House. In contrast to Neugebauer's "baby killer" comment, Stupak and the Politifact watchdog group agree, "there will be no public funding of abortion in this legislation" that Neugebauer detests.

The New York Times and Colorado Springs Gazette have compared Neugebauer's comment to Joe Wilson shouting "You lie!" during President Barack Obama's September 2009 address to Congress, and to racial and sexual slurs said to have been shouted at Democratic legislators outside the Capitol building by members of the public who opposed the bill during the 48 hours preceding Neugebauer's March 21, 2010, outburst. Neugebauer's comment was covered by media worldwide, including Canada's Maclean's magazine, the United Kingdom's The Times, and Australia's Sydney Morning Herald.

=== Legislation sponsored ===
Neugebauer has sponsored the National Association of Registered Agents and Brokers Reform Act of 2013 (H.R. 1155; 113th Congress) (H.R. 1155), a bill meant to reduce the regulatory costs of complying with multiple states' requirements for insurance companies, making it easier for the same corporation to operate in multiple states. The bill would transform the National Association of Registered Agents and Brokers (NARAB) into a clearing house that set up its own standards that insurance companies would be required to meet in order to do business in other states. In this new system, however, the insurance company would only have to meet the requirements of their home state and the NARAB (only two entities), not their home state and every other state they wished to operate in (multiple entities).

Proponents of the bill argued that it would help lower costs for insurance companies and make insurance cheaper for people to buy. It passed the House on September 10, 2013.

On April 26, 2013, Neugebauer introduced the National Windstorm Impact Reduction Act Reauthorization of 2014 (H.R. 1786; 113th Congress), a bill that would reauthorize the National Windstorm Impact Reduction Program (NWIRP), which was created to improve the understanding of windstorms and their impacts and to develop measures to reduce the damage they cause.

=== National World War II Memorial confrontation ===
On October 2, 2013, during the United States federal government shutdown of 2013, Neugebauer publicly scolded a National Park Service ranger who was enforcing the agency's closure of the National World War II Memorial due to the lapse in appropriations. His actions were widely criticized in the media, and he has responded that the phrase "The Park Service should be ashamed of themselves" was taken out of context.

== Political campaigns ==
Neugebauer was elected to Congress after a hotly contested special election runoff in the spring of 2003. The seat came open after 18-year Republican incumbent Larry Combest announced his retirement not long after having been reelected to a 10th term in 2002. Although Combest had been the only Republican ever to represent this district, the 19th has long been one of the most conservative areas of Texas (indeed, in the entire nation), and it was virtually taken for granted that Combest would be succeeded by another Republican. The 19th has not supported a Democrat for president since 1964, and Combest's first bid for the seat had been the only time in the previous two decades that a Democrat won more than 40 percent of the vote.

Neugebauer was one of seven candidates to run in the primary, all Republicans, though the district was so heavily Republican that any Democratic candidate would have faced nearly impossible odds in any event. Neugebauer stressed his conservative credentials; he described himself as a "pro-family, pro-life Christian who has a personal relationship with Jesus Christ" and believed that "our region's most precious resources are our values."

Neugebauer led the primary field, but finished well short of a majority. He was forced into a runoff with Mike Conaway of Midland, the chairman of the Texas Board of Public Accountancy and a friend of President George W. Bush. In a close third-place finish in the first round of balloting was then-State Representative Carl Isett of Lubbock. In the runoff election, Neugebauer defeated Conaway by only 587 votes, becoming only the fourth person to represent the 19th since its creation in 1935. Soon afterward in 2004, Conaway won election to Congress in the newly reconfigured 11th District.

Neugebauer ran for a full term in 2004, facing 26-year incumbent Democrat Charles Stenholm of Abilene. Stenholm had previously represented the Abilene-based 17th District, but that district had been dismantled in the 2003 Texas redistricting. The largest chunk of Stenholm's former territory, including most of Abilene, was thrown into Neugebauer's district. Although Stenholm had more seniority, the new district retained about 60 percent of Neugebauer's former territory, a disadvantage Stenholm was unable to overcome despite his seniority. Neugebauer won by 18 points, taking 58 percent to Stenholm's 40 percent. Not only was it the first time since Combest's initial bid that a Democrat crossed 40 percent, but Stenholm was the first reasonably well-financed Democrat to run in the district since then. Underscoring how Republican this district was, Neugebauer was reelected four more times with little substantive opposition. He won 68 percent in 2006, a year which saw heavy Republican losses nationally. It would be the last time he dropped below 70 percent. His margin actually increased in 2008, another year of severe losses for Republicans nationally.

=== 2012 ===
Neugebauer faced opposition in the May 29 Republican primary from Chris Winn, who resigned as the Lubbock County Republican chairman to enter the race. Neugebauer defeated Winn, 45,372 (74.3%) to 15,675 (25.7%).

=== 2017 ===
Press reports indicated that Neugebauer was under consideration to head the Consumer Financial Protection Bureau in the incoming first Trump administration. The job was ultimately given to Mick Mulvaney.

=== Campaign funding ===
During the first seven years of his political career, from 2003 to February 2010, he has raised $6.4 million, most of these funds coming from the oil and gas, real estate, commercial banking and crop production/processing industries, and leadership PACs. His largest corporate and association donors have been the National Auto Dealers Association, National Association of Home Builders, Quantum Energy Partners, the National Beer Wholesalers Association and the National Association of Realtors. Outspoken against abortion during Congress' debate on health care reform legislation, according to the nonpartisan OpenSecrets, Neugebauer has received a total of $3,000 during his career from people and committees associated with anti-abortion advocacy groups.

==== Investigation ====
In October 2015, the Campaign for Accountability asked the Office of Congressional Ethics to investigate Neugebauer for allegations of bribery and illegal gratuity related to $8,000 given to Neugebauer by Pay Day Loan financiers for his co-sponsorship of H.R.1121 - Responsible Consumer Financial Protection Regulations Act of 2011 which provided additional protection and lack of regulation to Pay Day Loan lenders.

== Personal life ==
Neugebauer married his high school sweetheart, the former Dana Collins, and they have two sons, Todd Neugebauer, President of Aspect Holdings, LLC, and Toby Neugebauer, the co-CEO of Quantum Energy Partners. They also have four grandchildren. As of 2010, Neugebauer served as a deacon at a Southern Baptist church.

== Electoral history ==
US House election, 2004: Texas District 19
Party	Candidate	Votes	%	±%
Republican	Randy Neugebauer (incumbent)	136,459	58.4	−33.2
Democratic	Charles Stenholm	93,531	40.0	+40.0
Libertarian	Richard "Chip" Peterson	3,524	1.5	+6.9
Majority		42,928	18.4	
Turnout		233,514		
Republican hold		Swing	-36.6	

US House election, 2006: Texas District 19
Party	Candidate	Votes	%	±%
Republican	Randy Neugebauer (incumbent)	92,811	68	+9.6
Democratic	Robert Ricketts	40,853	30	−10.0
Libertarian	Fred Jones	3,300	2	+.5
Majority		48,558	38.0	
Turnout		136,964		
Republican hold		Swing		

US House election, 2008: Texas District 19
Party	Candidate	Votes	%	±%
Republican	Randy Neugebauer (incumbent)	168,501	72	+4
Democratic	Dwight Fullingim	58,030	25	−5
Libertarian	Richard "Chip" Peterson	6,080	3	+1
Majority				
Turnout		232,611		
Republican hold		Swing		

US House election, 2010: Texas District 19
Party	Candidate	Votes	%	±%
Republican	Randy Neugebauer (incumbent)	106,059	78	+6
Democratic	Andy Wilson	25,984	19	−6
Libertarian	Richard "Chip" Peterson	4,315	3	+0
Majority				
Turnout		136,358		
Republican hold		Swing		

US House election, 2012: Texas District 19
Party	Candidate	Votes	%	±%
Republican	Randy Neugebauer (incumbent)	160,136	85	+7
Libertarian	Richard "Chip" Peterson	28,359	15	+12
Majority				
Turnout		188,495		
Republican hold		Swing		

US House election, 2014: Texas District 19
Party	Candidate	Votes	%
Republican	Randy Neugebauer (incumbent)	90,160	77.2
Democratic	Neal Marchbanks	21,458	18.4
Libertarian	Richard (Chip) Peterson	5,146	4.4
Independent	Donald Vance (write-in)	54	0.0
Total votes		116,818	100.0
Republican hold			

U.S. House of Representatives
Preceded by Larry Combest	Member of the U.S. House of Representatives from Texas's 19th congressional district 2003–2017	Succeeded by Jodey Arrington
U.S. order of precedence (ceremonial)
Preceded by Charlie Gonzalez as Former U.S. Representative	Order of precedence of the United States as Former U.S. Representative	Succeeded by Ted Poe as Former U.S. Representative
