= Fire Sprinkler Incentive Act =

Proposed United States tax law

The Fire Sprinkler Incentive Act (FSIA) is the name of an American piece of legislation that has been introduced in both the House and the Senate since 2003. The legislation would amend the 1986 Internal Revenue Code by classifying fire sprinkler retrofits as either a Section 179 depreciation deduction or a fifteen-year property for purposes of depreciation. Currently the tax depreciation time for commercial property is 39 years and 27.5 for residential.

The FSIA would allow for a more rapid recovery of cost, and would reduce the annual economic and human losses that fire in the U.S. inflicts on the national economy, environment, and quality of life. Passage of the FSIA would be consistent with past practice at the federal level, where Congress has historically provided incentives and left decisions regarding adoption of fire protection requirements up to state and local government.

== Background ==
After the Station nightclub fire killed 100 concertgoers in Rhode Island in February 2003, many lawmakers took note of the need to update building and fire codes, but no national action was taken. A large coalition (including firefighter associations, labor organizations, fire sprinkler manufacturers and fire and life organizations) has since formed to lobby congress to pass the FSIA.

The FSIA was first introduced in the House of Representatives by Rep. Curt Weldon [R-PA] in 2003 and in the Senate by Sen. Rick Santorum [R-PA] in 2004. The legislation has been introduced in both chambers in every Congress since the 108th session, but has never made it out of committee.

The 111th Congress was thought to be more successful with regards to the FSIA’s passage by focusing on the immediate needs of the country, including unemployment. Passage of the FSIA would mean an increase in employment among small businesses that offer sprinkler installation services.

The biggest present obstacle to passing the FSIA is the expected cost.

== Effect ==
According to the National Fire Protection Association (NFPA), there are more than 16,000 fire-related injuries, 3,200 civilian deaths, and 100 firefighter deaths each year. A 2007 NFPA study found that in buildings with properly installed sprinklers, the death rate per fire can be reduced by 83 percent and property damage decreased by 69 percent. The NFPA also has no record of two or more deaths in an educational, institutional, public assembly or residential building with properly installed and functioning sprinkler systems.

The direct property damage caused by fire is more than $10 billion annually in the U.S., rising to $107 billion when accounting for indirect costs such as lost economic activity. The total cost due to fire in America reaches $347 billion when including human losses, economic losses, and the cost of provisions to prevent the cost of fire.

Despite these touted benefits; despite support from firefighters, fire sprinkler manufacturers, and fire and life safety groups; and despite widespread nominal support from members of Congress, the bill has yet to become law, even though it has been introduced in every Congress since 2003. Gregory Cade, director of government affairs for the National Fallen Firefighters Foundation, said in an interview that the bill faces two main political obstacles. The first is the loss of revenue for the Treasury, which would increase the budget deficit unless other taxes are raised or expenses curtailed, and no agreement has been reached on the means to achieve that balance. Second, the fact that the bill would amend the tax code tends to open up the wider debates around the comprehensive restructuring of the tax code as a whole, which has been a contentious area of debate.

== Legislative history ==
Congress	Short title	Bill number(s)	Date introduced	Sponsor(s)	# of cosponsors	Latest status
115th Congress	Fire Sprinkler Incentive Act	H.R. 1481	March 9, 2017	Rep. Tom Reed (R-NY)	7	Referred to the United States House Committee on Ways and Means.
115th Congress	Fire Sprinkler Incentive Act	S. 602	March 9, 2017	Sen. Susan Collins (R-ME)	7	Read twice and referred to the United States Senate Committee on Finance.
114th Congress	Fire Sprinkler Incentive Act	H.R. 3591	September 22, 2015	Rep. Tom Reed (R-NY)	27	Referred to the United States House Committee on Ways and Means.
114th Congress	Fire Sprinkler Incentive Act	S. 2068	September 22, 2015	Sen. Susan Collins (R-ME)	5	Read twice and referred to the United States Senate Committee on Finance.
113th Congress	Fire Sprinkler Incentive Act	H.R. 5622	September 18, 2014	Rep. James Langevin (D-RI)	12	Referred to the United States House Committee on Ways and Means.
113th Congress	Fire Sprinkler Incentive Act	S. 1163	June 13, 2013	Sen. Tom Carper (D-DE)	1	Read twice and referred to the United States Senate Committee on Finance.
112th Congress	Fire Sprinkler Incentive Act	H.R. 1792	May 5, 2011	Rep. Aaron Schock (R-IL)	51	Referred to the United States House Committee on Ways and Means.
112th Congress	Fire Sprinkler Incentive Act	S. 1035	May 19, 2011	Sen. Tom Carper (D-DE)	5	Read twice and referred to the United States Senate Committee on Finance.
111th Congress	Fire Sprinkler Incentive Act of 2009	H.R. 1194	February 25, 2009	Rep. James Langevin (D-RI)	138	Referred to the United States House Committee on Ways and Means.
111th Congress	Fire Sprinkler Incentive Act of 2009	S. 2947	January 22, 2010	Sen. Tom Carper (D-DE)	7	Read twice and referred to the United States Senate Committee on Finance.
110th Congress	Fire Sprinkler Incentive Act of 2007	H.R. 1742	March 28, 2007	Rep. James Langevin (D-RI)	148	Referred to the United States House Committee on Ways and Means.
110th Congress	Fire Sprinkler Incentive Act of 2007	S. 582	February 14, 2007	Sen. Gordon Smith (R-OR)	27	Read twice and referred to the United States Senate Committee on Finance.
109th Congress	Fire Sprinkler Incentive Act of 2005	H.R. 1131	March 3, 2005	Rep. Curt Weldon (R-PA)	165	Referred to the United States House Committee on Ways and Means.
109th Congress	Fire Sprinkler Incentive Act of 2005	S. 512	March 3, 2005	Sen. Rick Santorum (R-PA)	15	Read twice and referred to the United States Senate Committee on Finance.
108th Congress	Fire Sprinkler Incentive Act of 2003	H.R. 1824	April 11, 2003	Rep. Curt Weldon (R-PA)	140	Referred to the United States House Committee on Ways and Means.
108th Congress	Fire Sprinkler Incentive Act of 2003	S. 2860	September 29, 2004	Sen. Rick Santorum (R-PA)	2	Read twice and referred to the United States Senate Committee on Finance.

== Coalition support ==
- The Fire Sprinkler Incentive Act has been endorsed and supported by the following organizations:
- American Fire Sprinkler Association
- American Health Care Association
- American Hotel and Lodging Association
- American Institute of Architects
- American Insurance Association
- American Society of Safety Engineers
- Building Owners and Managers Association
- Congressional Fire Services Institute
- Fire Department Safety Officers Association
- Home Safety Council
- Independent Insurance Agents & Brokers of America
- International Association of Arson Investigators
- International Association of Black Professional Firefighters
- International Association of Fire Chiefs
- International Association of Fire Fighters
- International Code Council
- International Fire Marshals Association
- International Fire Service Training Association
- International Society of Fire Service Instructors
- Mechanical Contractors Association
- National Association of Elected Fire Officials
- National Association of State Fire Marshals
- National Fallen Firefighters Foundation
- National Fire Protection Association
- National Fire Sprinkler Association
- National Society of Executive Fire Officers
- National Volunteer Fire Council
- North American Fire Training Directors
- SimplexGrinnell
- Society of Fire Protection Engineers
- The Associated General Contractors of America
- The Committee on Pipe and Tube Imports
- The Lightning Safety Alliance
- Underwriters Laboratories
- United Association of Journeymen and Apprentices of the Plumbing and Pipe Fitting Industry
- USA Sprinkler Fitters Association
