= Right to Financial Privacy Act =

1978 United States federal law

Right to Financial Privacy Act of 1978
- Enacted by: the 95th United States Congress

Citations
- Public law: Pub. L. 95–630
- Statutes at Large: 92 Stat. 3641, 3697

Legislative history
- Introduced in the House as H.R.14279 by Henry Reuss (D–WI) and Frank Annunzio (D–IL) on October 10, 1978; Committee consideration by House Committee on Banking, Currency, and Housing, Senate Committee on Banking, Housing and Urban Affairs; Passed the House on October 11, 1978; Passed the Senate on October 12, 1978; Agreed to by the House on October 14, 1978 and by the Senate on October 14, 1978; Signed into law by President Jimmy Carter on November 10, 1978

Major amendments
- USA PATRIOT Act; USA Freedom Act

The Right to Financial Privacy Act of 1978 (RFPA; codified at 12 U.S.C. ch. 35, § 3401 et seq.) is a United States federal law, Title XI of the Financial Institutions Regulatory and Interest Rate Control Act of 1978, that gives the customers of financial institutions the right to some level of privacy from government searches.

Before the Act was passed, the United States government did not have to tell customers that it was accessing their records, and customers did not have the right to prevent such actions. The Act came about after the United States Supreme Court held, in United States v. Miller 425 U.S. 435 (1976), that financial records are the property of the financial institution with which they are held, rather than the property of the customer. Under the RFPA, the government must receive the consent of the customer before they can access said customer's financial information. The Act prescribes statutory damages of $100 per violation, and a number of different violations can be aggregated in a class action.

Under the RFPA, the FBI could obtain records with a national security letter (NSL) only if the FBI could first demonstrate the person was a foreign power or an agent of a foreign power. Compliance by the recipient of the NSL was voluntary, and states' consumer privacy laws often allowed financial institutions to decline the requests. In 1986, Congress amended RFPA to allow the government to compel disclosure of the requested information. The USA PATRIOT Act of 2001 amended the RFPA.

== See also ==
- Gramm–Leach–Bliley Act (GLBA)
- Financial privacy laws in the United States
- Privacy laws of the United States
- Fair Credit Reporting Act
