= Toby Neugebauer =

Americana businessman

Toby Randolph Neugebauer
- Born: December 1, 1971 (age 54)
- Education: New York University (B.B.A.)
- Occupation: Businessman
- Parent(s): Dana Collins and Randy Neugebauer

Toby Randolph Neugebauer is an American billionaire businessman and political donor based in the state of Texas.

== Early life and education ==
His father is Randy Neugebauer, a former member of the United States House of Representatives for Texas's 19th congressional district. He received a Bachelor of Business Administration in Finance from New York University.

== Career ==
He was an investment banker at Kidder, Peabody & Co.'s Natural Resources Group. He later co-founded Windrock Capital. In 1998, together with S. Wil VanLoh, Jr., he co-founded Quantum Energy Partners, an energy private equity firm headquartered in Houston, Texas. He served as its managing director and now serves on its investment committee. The company invested heavily in the Barnett Shale, which is regulated by the Texas Commission on Environmental Quality.

He served on the boards of Texoil, Crown Oil Partners, Parks & Luttrell Energy Partners and Aspect Energy. He also served as chairman of Linn Energy and was a co-founder of Legacy Reserves. He currently serves on the boards of Meritage Energy Partners, EnSight Energy Partners, Tri-C Energy, Rockford Energy Partners and TriQuest Energy Corp and QA Global GP; and is general partner of QR Energy.

Neugebauer founded fintech company GloriFi. However, GloriFi had serious difficulties and shut down after laying off most of their employees.

== Political activity ==
He has donated $110,000 to Rick Perry, according to the Texans for Public Justice. The donation came from Blackstone Limited I, and was given to a Super PAC called Jobs for Iowa, which shared the same address as Quantum Energy Partners. He has also let the governor fly on his private jet to attend a meeting with the Interstate Oil and Gas Compact Commission in Biloxi, Mississippi, which was reported as a $6,250 "in-kind" campaign contribution. In 2015, he was the sole donor to Ted Cruz' Super PAC, "Keep The Promise II", contributing $10 million, representing one of the largest campaign donations ever made of this type. Neugebauer was in charge of the Super PAC, which was part of a group of 4 Super PACs supporting Cruz. As of mid March 2016, practically none of the money in the Neugebauer led Super PAC had been spent, leading to media speculations that he might withdraw the money from the race. After Cruz's withdrawal from the presidential campaign on May 3, 2016, Neugebauer withdrew the unspent $9M from the Super PAC.

== Personal life ==
Neugebauer is married and has two children. In 2016 he was listed as the principal officer of the charity, Matthew 6:20 Foundation, whose motto is “Support the purposes of the Christian Community.”

In 2024, his 17,679-square-foot mansion near Dallas, which is a near-replica of the White House, was on sale for $40 million.
