= Tenant screening =

Evaluation process for potential renters

Tenant screening is used primarily by residential landlords and property managers to evaluate prospective tenants. The purpose is to assess the likelihood the tenant will fulfill the terms of the lease or rental agreement and will take care of the rental property. The process culminates in a decision as to whether to approve the applicant, approve the applicant conditionally (such as requiring an increased security deposit or cosigner), or deny housing.

== Tenant screening process ==
The tenant screening process typically begins when the prospective tenant (each adult applicant) completes a rental application and pays an application fee and perhaps a holding deposit.

Rental applications are designed to collect personally identifying information (name, social security number, date of birth, etc.), address, employment, criminal, and eviction history. In addition, a signature is generally required, attesting to the accuracy of information provided, agreeing to specific terms and conditions, and authorizing the procurement of a tenant screening report.

Most landlords rely on a tenant screening company to produce a tenant screening report - to compile relevant credit, public records, and other information for vetting prospective tenants. Information gathered from the application, tenant screening report, and the landlord's research is used to arrive at a decision whether to grant housing based on the landlord's rental criteria. Some companies, such as RealPage, have begun using AI tools to screen applicants. Companies also use non-ai automated verification, arguing that non-human verification is more likely to comply with housing regulations.

Applicant-initiated tenant screening services are beginning to emerge. Under this model, applicants order reports on themselves and grant access to prospective landlords.

=== Application and reports ===
Tenant screening reports often contain one or more of the following elements:

- Consumer credit report (with or without a score) - from one of the three international credit bureaus (Experian, Equifax, or Transunion).
- Eviction records search
- Criminal records search
- Sex offender registry search
- Specially designated nationals search (frequently referred to as an OFAC search)
- Rental references
- Employment verifications
- Recommendation - based on the landlord's criteria

Credit reports and database searches are often returned instantly via secure websites. However, additional information resulting from more in-depth public records searches, rental references, and employment verifications can take anywhere from a few hours to a few days. Some landlords may also make use of waitlists, although these may be subject to regulations, especially with affordable housing programs.

== In the United States ==
=== Tenant screening companies ===
Tenant screening services are specialized consumer reporting agencies (C.R.A.s) or investigative consumer reporting agencies as defined and regulated by the Fair Credit Reporting Act (FCRA), 15 U.S.C. § 1681 et seq.

C.R.A.s have many obligations under the FCRA. Notably, they must establish the identity of each end-user (landlord) and the purpose for which the information is sought - before providing a tenant screening report.

- They must "follow reasonable procedures to assure maximum accuracy of the information concerning the individual to whom the report relates."
- "Upon request, and subject to section 610(a)(1)of the FCRA (§ 1681h), clearly and accurately disclose to the consumer "all information in the consumer's file at the time of the request." Failure to do so can result in concrete regulatory action. See http://www.ftc.gov/opa/2010/02/saferent.shtm.
- Additional C.R.A. compliance procedures are outlined in Section 607 of the FCRA (15 U.S.C. § 1681e).

=== Landlord responsibilities ===
Landlords are Users of Consumer Reports, defined and regulated by the FCRA. The FCRA imposes specific requirements on landlords as users. Notably, they must "…provide oral, written, or electronic notice of adverse action taken based in whole or in part on any information contained in a consumer (tenant screening] report. Adverse action is a determination that is adverse to the consumer's interest. Certainly, denial of tenancy is an adverse action. But so too is attaching additional terms, such as requiring an additional deposit or cosigner. The notification must include:

- The name, address, and telephone number of the consumer reporting agency (tenant screening company] that furnished the report; and
- The consumer's right to a free copy of the tenant screening report; and
- The consumer's right to dispute the accuracy and completeness of the information.

The Dodd-Frank Wall Street Reform and Consumer Protection Act (Dodd-Frank) amended Section 615 of the FCRA to add a new requirement that a person (landlord) taking Adverse Action… "provide to the consumer written or electronic disclosure (A) of a numerical credit score as defined in section 609(f)(2)(A) [of the FCRA] used by such person in taking any Adverse Action based in whole or in part on any information in a consumer report; and (B) of the information outlined in subparagraphs (B) through (E) of section 609(f)(1)," including:

- Numerical Score
- Score Range
- Score Factors
- Score Date
- Score Source

=== Tenant screening and US law ===
There is a substantial body of law regulating consumer reporting. The FCRA, 15 U.S.C. § 1681 et seq. as amended by the Fair and Accurate Credit Transactions Act of 2003 (FACTA) and more recently by Dodd-Frank is the primary body of law regulating consumer reporting. Many states have laws regulating consumer reporting as well. Section 625 of the FCRA (15 U.S.C. § 1681t) addresses the Relation (of the FCRA) to State laws by stating that "…this title does not annul, alter, affect, or exempt any person subject to the provisions of this title from complying with the laws of any State concerning the collection, distribution, or use of any information on consumer, …except to the extent that those laws are inconsistent with any provision of this title…". Federal law pre-empts state law to the extent of any inconsistencies.

Dodd-Frank transferred regulatory authority over consumer reporting (and therefore tenant screening companies) from the Federal Trade Commission (F.T.C.) to the new Consumer Financial Protection Bureau in 2011.

Federal and state fair housing and residential landlord-tenant law impact the tenant screening process several ways. It is a violation of fair housing law to treat protected individuals differently in the tenant screening process. Fair housing law at the federal level is found in Title VIII of the Civil Rights Act of 1968. Residential landlord-tenant law often limits what landlords may charge for tenant screening to the actual costs of obtaining the background information, not to exceed the customary fees charged by a screening service in the general area.

Valid government-issued photo identification is typically required to confirm the identity of applicants and in compliance with the Federal Trade Commission 's (F.T.C.'s) identity theft Red Flags Rule.

==== Disparate impact ====
Fair housing advocates have long argued for the application of the disparate impact legal theory (historically applied to employment practices) to Title VIII (Fair Housing Act) claims. They argue, for example, that people of certain races and ethnicities are disproportionately represented in the criminal justice system, and that use of illegal record data for tenant screening purposes has a disparate impact on those individuals and is therefore discriminatory.

The debate was largely settled in 2015 when in the Texas Department of Housing and Community Affairs (The Department) v. The Inclusive Communities Project, Inc.(I.C.P.), the Supreme Court of the United States affirmed that a facially neutral business practice that has a disparate impact on a protected class could form the basis of a Fair Housing Act claim. The decision was based on the Housing & Urban Development (H.U.D.) regulation interpreting the Fair Housing Act's Discriminatory Effects Standard - including its burden-shifting framework for adjudicating such claims.

Landlords may in some cases have a right and obligation to take reasonable steps to protect themselves, their residents, and neighbors from prospective residents with a history of violent felonies. Landlords can reduce disparate impact by limiting consideration of criminal convictions (versus arrests) to offenses relevant to the tenancy that occur within a reasonable period.

Note section 605(2) of the FCRA prohibits C.R.A.'s from reporting records of arrest, civil suits, and civil judgments from the date of final disposition antedate the report by more than seven years. Some states similarly limit reporting of criminal convictions - while there is no such limit in the FCRA.

== Criticisms ==
The application and tenant screening process puts up housing barriers. Affordable housing advocates say that there is little evidence that factors such as number of evictions or criminal history are good predictors of whether or not a tenant will break a lease. Advocates also say unclear guidelines create inequitable leasing decisions with disparate impact.

Criminal background checks for housing are often cited as a contributing factor for recidivism and have been banned in some localities.

=== Reform and advocacy groups ===
The Poverty & Race Research Action Counsel recommended not rejecting tenants for low or no credit scores, allowing tenants to use non-traditional credit scores, providing specific reasons for rejections, providing exceptions for criminal records (based on rehabilitation, nature of crime, and survival of domestic abuse), and not using residency preferences.

Tenants unions often oppose high barriers in the tenant screening process. In 2024, the National Housing Law Project, the National Low Income Housing Coalition, and the Tenant Union Federation put out a "National Tenant Bill of Rights," which included calling for a "fair application process." Items included: banning blanket rejection of tenants based on credit score or eviction records, eliminating application fees, requiring inaccuracy rates to be listed on tenant screening companies' websites, and creating a single, standardized application for all federally subsidized housing programs.
