= National Windstorm Impact Reduction Act Reauthorization of 2014 =

- Long title: To reauthorize the National Windstorm Impact Reduction Program, and for other purposes.
- Announced in: the 113th United States Congress
- Sponsored by: Rep. Randy Neugebauer (R, TX-19)
- Number of co-sponsors: 0

Codification
- Acts affected: National Windstorm Impact Reduction Act of 2004, Federal Advisory Committee Act
- U.S.C. sections affected: 5 U.S.C., 42 U.S.C. § 15702
- Agencies affected: United States Congress, Office of Management and Budget, National Institute of Standards and Technology, National Science Foundation, Office of Science and Technology Policy, Federal Emergency Management Agency, National Oceanic and Atmospheric Administration
- Authorizations of appropriations: $64,200,000

Legislative history
- Introduced in the House as H.R. 1786 by Rep. Randy Neugebauer (R, TX-19) on April 26, 2013; Committee consideration by United States House Committee on Science, Space and Technology, United States House Committee on Transportation and Infrastructure, United States House Transportation Subcommittee on Economic Development, Public Buildings and Emergency Management, United States House Science Subcommittee on Research and Technology

The National Windstorm Impact Reduction Act Reauthorization of 2014 (H.R. 1786) is a bill that would reauthorize the National Windstorm Impact Reduction Program (NWIRP), which was created to improve the understanding of windstorms and their impacts and to develop measures to reduce the damage they cause. The bill also would establish new committees to coordinate the activities of federal agencies participating in the program and to assess developments in efforts to mitigate damage from windstorms.

The bill was introduced into the United States House of Representatives during the 113th United States Congress.

== Background ==
According to the Insurance Institute for Business & Home Safety (IBHS), during the five years of 2008-2012, there were over 7500 tornadoes reported in the United States, as well as 75,000 high wind reports, and 17 different tropical cyclones that hit the United States. A report from the Center for American Progress estimated that the federal government spent $136 billion from 2011 to 2013 on disaster relief and recovery efforts. The National Oceanic and Atmospheric Administration (NOAA) reports that since 1980 there have been 151 weather-related disasters in the United States that each individually exceeded $1 billion in economic losses, altogether costing over $1 trillion.

The National Windstorm Impact Reduction Program is run by the National Institute of Standards and Technology, the Federal Emergency Management Agency (FEMA), the NOAA, and the National Science Foundation (NSF).

== Provisions of the bill ==
This summary is based largely on the summary provided by the Congressional Research Service, a public domain source.

The National Windstorm Impact Reduction Reauthorization Act of 2014 would amend the National Windstorm Impact Reduction Act of 2004 to revise provisions governing the National Windstorm Impact Reduction Program. The bill would designate the National Institute of Standards and Technology (NIST) as the entity with primary responsibility for Program planning and coordination.

The bill would replace provisions establishing an Interagency Working Group with provisions establishing the Interagency Coordinating Committee on Windstorm Impact Reduction. The bill would direct the Committee to submit a Strategic Plan for the Program that includes: (1) prioritized goals that will mitigate against the loss of life and property from future windstorms; (2) research objectives to achieve those goals; (3) a description of the role of each Program agency in achieving such goals; (4) the methods by which progress will be assessed; and (5) an explanation of how the Program will foster the transfer of research results into outcomes, such as improved model building codes. Requires the Committee to submit a progress report and to develop a coordinated budget for the Program, to be submitted at the time of the President's annual budget submission.

The bill would revise provisions providing for the establishment of an Advisory Committee on Windstorm Impact Reduction (currently, the National Advisory Committee on Windstorm Impact Reduction) to offer assessments of the Program, including assessments of the priorities of the Strategic Plan. Terminates the Committee on September 30, 2016.

Authorizes appropriations to the agencies carrying out the Program for FY2014-FY2016.

== Congressional Budget Office report ==
This summary is based largely on the summary provided by the Congressional Budget Office, as ordered reported by the House Committee on Science, Space, and Technology on February 28, 2014. This is a public domain source.

H.R. 1786 would reauthorize the National Windstorm Impact Reduction Program, which was created to improve the understanding of windstorms and their impacts and to develop measures to reduce the damage they cause. The bill also would establish new committees to coordinate the activities of federal agencies participating in the program and to assess developments in efforts to mitigate damage from windstorms.

Assuming appropriation of the authorized amounts, the Congressional Budget Office (CBO) estimates that implementing H.R. 1786 would cost $21 million over the 2015-2019 period. Pay-as-you-go procedures do not apply to this legislation because it would not affect direct spending or revenues.

H.R. 1786 contains no intergovernmental or private-sector mandates as defined in the Unfunded Mandates Reform Act and would not affect the budgets of state, local, or tribal governments.

== Procedural history ==
The National Windstorm Impact Reduction Reauthorization Act of 2014 was introduced into the United States House of Representatives on April 26, 2013 by Rep. Randy Neugebauer (R, TX-19). It was referred to the United States House Committee on Science, Space and Technology, the United States House Committee on Transportation and Infrastructure, the United States House Transportation Subcommittee on Economic Development, Public Buildings and Emergency Management, and the United States House Science Subcommittee on Research and Technology. On March 13, 2014, it was reported (amended) alongside House Report 113-380 part 1.

== Debate and discussion ==
The Insurance Institute for Business & Home Safety (IBHS), a 501(c) organization funded by the insurance industry, supported the bill, with their General Counsel and Senior Vice President for Public Policy Debra T. Ballen testifying before Congress about the bill. According to IBHS, federal research into mitigating damage from windstorms is "critical" to reducing risk. The IBHS also argued that the NWIRP is an important program that can check and expand upon the research into mitigating the damage of windstorms that IBHS is already conducting. IBHS argued strongly in favor of mitigation efforts in their testimony, indicating that it protects the environment from post-disaster debris, helps the community, cuts costs for both individuals and taxpayers, and is a smart business strategy.

Representatives Frederica Wilson (D-FL) and Eddie Bernice Johnson (D-TX) both opposed, in a hearing on the bill, the funding decrease of 14 percent in the bill.

The BuildStrong Coalition supported the bill, with chairman Jimi Grande arguing that a recent tropical storm provided "a stark reminder of the importance of promoting common sense mitigation legislation that will better protect property, save lives and ultimately reduce taxpayer exposure to natural disasters."

== See also ==
- List of bills in the 113th United States Congress
