= National Association of Registered Agents and Brokers Reform Act of 2013 =

- Long title: To reform the National Association of Registered Agents and Brokers, and for other purposes.
- Announced in: the 113th United States Congress
- Sponsored by: Rep. Randy Neugebauer (R, TX-19)
- Number of co-sponsors: 42

Codification
- Acts affected: Gramm-Leach-Bliley Act, NAIC Producer Licensing Model Act, District of Columbia Nonprofit Corporation Act, Federal Administrative Procedure Act
- U.S.C. sections affected: 15 U.S.C. § 6751 et seq., 18 U.S.C.
- Agencies affected: United States Senate, Executive Office of the President, United States Department of Justice, Federal Bureau of Investigation

Legislative history
- Introduced in the House as H.R. 1155 by Rep. Randy Neugebauer (R, TX-19) on March 14, 2013; Committee consideration by United States House Committee on Financial Services,

The National Association of Registered Agents and Brokers Reform Act of 2013 (H.R. 1155) is a bill that was introduced into the United States House of Representatives during the 113th United States Congress. The bill ultimately failed to be enacted.

The bill is meant to reduce the regulatory costs of complying with multiple states' requirements for insurance companies, making it easier for the same company to operate in multiple states. The bill would transform the National Association of Registered Agents and Brokers (NARAB) into a clearing house that set up its own standards that insurance companies would be required to meet in order to do business in other states. In this new system, however, the insurance company would only have to meet the requirements of their home state and the NARAB (only two entities), not their home state and every other state they wished to operate in (multiple entities). Proponents of the bill argued that it would help lower costs for insurance companies and make insurance cheaper for people to buy.

In 2015, a similar law was enacted as part of Terrorism Risk Insurance Program Reauthorization Act of 2015.

== Background ==
Similar legislation passed in the House in two previous congresses - H.R. 5611 in the 110th Congress and H.R. 2554 in the 111th Congress.

== Provisions of the bill ==
This summary is based largely on the summary provided by the Congressional Research Service, a public domain source.

The National Association of Registered Agents and Brokers Reform Act of 2013 would amend the Gramm-Leach-Bliley Act to repeal the contingent conditions under which the National Association of Registered Agents and Brokers (NARAB) shall not be established. It then would reestablish the NARAB without those contingent conditions, converting it into a nonprofit corporation with the responsibility to prescribe, on a multi-state basis, licensing and insurance producer qualification requirements and conditions.

The bill is written so that the individual state in the United States would retain their state-level regulatory authority over: (1) licensing, continuing education, and other qualification requirements of non-NARAB producers; (2) resident or nonresident producer appointment requirements; (3) supervision and disciplining of such producers; and (4) setting of licensing fees for insurance producers.

The bill would authorize the NARAB to: (1) establish membership criteria, including a mandatory criminal background check of the producer's Federal Bureau of Investigation (FBI) identification record for state-licensed insurance producers, and (2) deny membership to a state-licensed insurance producer on the basis of the criminal history information obtained, or where the producer has been subject to certain disciplinary action. It would prohibit the NARAB from establishing criteria that unfairly limit the ability of a small insurance producer to become a member of NARAB. It does authorize the NARAB to establish separate classes of membership and membership criteria, and requires it to do so for business entities. The bill would authorize the NARAB to deny membership to any state-licensed insurance producer for failure to meet membership criteria.

The bill would state that NARAB membership authorizes an insurance producer to engage in the business of insurance in any state for any lines of insurance specified in the producer's home state license, including claims adjustments and settlement, risk management, and specified insurance-related consulting activities. But, it retains state regulatory jurisdiction regarding: (1) consumer protection and market conduct, and (2) state disciplinary authority.

The bill would require the NARAB to: (1) receive and investigate consumer complaints, maintaining a toll-free telephone number; and (2) refer any such complaint to the state insurance regulator.

Finally, the bill would authorize the NARAB to coordinate with state insurance regulators to establish: (1) a central clearinghouse, and (2) a national database for the collection of regulatory information concerning the activities of insurance producers.

== Procedural history ==
=== House ===
The National Association of Registered Agents and Brokers Reform Act of 2013 (H.R. 1155) was introduced into the House by Rep. Randy Neugebauer (R, TX-19) on March 14, 2013. It was referred to the United States House Committee on Financial Services. On September 10, 2013, the House voted in Roll Call 450 to pass the bill 397-6.

== Debate and discussion ==
Rep. Randy Neugebauer (R, TX-19) explained why he was in favor of the bill by saying, "On average, multi-state agents sell insurance in eight states... that means eight different applications, eight different procedures... and separate background checks and multiple, inconsistent standards and duplicative processes." Rep. David Scott (D-GA), a cosponsor of the bill, argued that it would make insurance costs lower for consumers; he also believed it was an important measure because people no longer stay in one place, but move from state to state.

The bill was also supported by the Independent Insurance Agents & Brokers of America and the National Association of Mutual Insurance Companies.

== See also ==
- List of bills in the 113th United States Congress
- Insurance
- Registered agent
- History of insurance
- Gramm–Leach–Bliley Act
- Insurance in the United States
- List of United States insurance companies
