= Bank holding company =

Company with significant ownership of one or more banks

A bank holding company is a company that controls one or more banks, but does not necessarily engage in banking itself. The compound bancorp (banc/bank + corp[oration]) or bancorporation is often used to refer to such companies as well, particularly in the United States.

== United States ==
In the United States, a bank holding company, as provided by the Bank Holding Company Act of 1956 (12 U.S.C. § 1841 et seq.), is broadly defined as "any company that has control over a bank". All bank holding companies in the US are required to register with the Board of Governors of the Federal Reserve System.

=== Regulation ===
The Federal Reserve Board of Governors, under Regulation Y (12 CFR 225) has responsibility for regulating and supervising bank holding company activities, such as establishing capital standards, approving mergers and acquisitions and inspecting the operations of such companies. This authority applies even though a bank owned by a holding company may be under the primary supervision of the Office of the Comptroller of the Currency or the Federal Deposit Insurance Corporation.

=== Bank holding company status ===
Becoming a bank holding company makes it easier for the firm to raise capital than as a traditional bank. The holding company can assume debt of shareholders on a tax free basis, borrow money, acquire other banks and non-bank entities more easily, and issue stock with greater regulatory ease. It also has a greater legal authority to conduct share repurchases of its own stock.

The downside includes responding to additional regulatory authorities, especially if there are more than 2,000 shareholders (note: prior to the Jobs Act or Jumpstart Our Business Startups Act, the shareholder number was 300), at which point the bank holding company is forced to register with the Securities and Exchange Commission. There are also added expenses of operating with an extra layer of administration.

=== 2008 financial crisis ===
As a result of the 2008 financial crisis, many traditional investment banks and finance corporations such as Goldman Sachs, Morgan Stanley, American Express, CIT Group and GMAC (now Ally Financial) converted to bank holding companies to gain access to the Federal Reserve's credit facilities.

== United Kingdom ==
In the United Kingdom, the Bank of England refers to bank holding companies as “parent financial holding companies” or “parent mixed financial holding companies.”

Financial holding companies (FHCs) are regulated by the Prudential Regulation Authority in accordance with Financial Services and Markets Act 2000, where applications will be approved in consultation with the Financial Conduct Authority.

== See also ==
- Banq (term)
- Gramm–Leach–Bliley Act
