= Banq =

Alternative spellings used for legal restriction evasion

"Banq" and "banc" are alternative spellings used in company names to evade legal restrictions on the use of the word 'bank' while maintaining a similar pronunciation. This practice is common in the financial services industry, particularly in the United States.

== Origin and usage ==
In the English language, banq and banc are alternative spellings pronounced identically to the word "bank". Both terms have been adopted by financial services companies and others to satisfy legal restrictions on the usage of the word bank. The compound bancorp (banc/bank + corp[oration]) is often used in the names of bank holding companies. For example, a hypothetical chartered bank named Bank of Manhattan might form a holding company named "Manhattan Bancorp", and a sister insurance business named "Banc of Manhattan Insurance". One well-known past example was Bank of America's investment banking entity, named Banc of America Securities (now part of Bank of America Merrill Lynch).

== Legal basis ==
This practice originates from legal necessity: in the United States, the commerce departments of state governments generally prohibit or restrict the use of certain words in the names of corporations unless those corporations are legitimate chartered banks. For example, words prohibited by the state of Louisiana include bank, banker, banking, savings, safe deposit, trust, trustee, and credit union.

== Examples ==
The evasive nature of the word does not necessarily indicate that an imposter is attempting to fraudulently impersonate a bank. One notable example is a company called Cachet Banq Inc., an automated clearing house processing service that performs automated banking transactions for payroll processing. The company does not claim to offer any banking services, such as deposits or loans, and would only be able to legally include the word "bank" in its name in its home state of California with the approval of the California Department of Financial Institutions.

A similar example includes a company called Wine Banq, whose name clearly suggests it has nothing to do with the banking industry.

== Variations by jurisdiction ==
Naming laws vary from jurisdiction to jurisdiction as well as their interpretations. Notable counter-examples include blood banks and sperm banks.

== Legal implications ==
The use of 'banq' or 'banc' in company names has legal implications. While it allows companies to evoke banking associations, it does not exempt them from financial regulations. Companies using these terms must still comply with relevant laws and may face scrutiny from regulatory bodies to ensure they are not misleading consumers about their services.

== See also ==
- Naming conventions
- Financial regulation
- Naming laws
