= Independent Insurance Agents & Brokers of America =

Organization in the USA

Independent Insurance Agents & Brokers of America (IIABA) is a national association of independent insurance agents. The national association is headquartered in Alexandria, Virginia and has affiliate offices in every state and the District of Columbia.

== History ==
The association was founded in 1896 as the National Association of Local Fire Insurance Agents. In 1913, the organization changed its name to the National Association of Insurance Agents when it expanded to include property-casualty business and coverages. The name was changed again in 1975 to the Independent Insurance Agents of America. In 2002, the association became the Independent Insurance Agents & Brokers of America (IIABA or the Big "I") to encompass the group's entire membership of independent insurance agents and brokers. Robert Rusbuldt is the current Big "I" president & CEO.

== Lobbying efforts ==
The IIABA has spent more than $1 million in 2010 in lobbying efforts on federal crop insurance, insurance licensing reform, and other insurance issues.

The IIABA supported the National Association of Registered Agents and Brokers Reform Act of 2013 (H.R. 1155; 113th Congress), a bill which would reduce the regulatory costs of complying with multiple states' requirements for insurance companies, making it easier for the same company to operate in multiple states.
