= Consumer Financial Protection Bureau v. RD Legal Funding, LLC =

2018 lawsuit in New York

Consumer Financial Protection Bureau v. RD Legal Funding LLC
- Court: United States District Court for the Southern District of New York
- Full case name: Consumer Financial Protection Bureau and the People of the State of New York, by Eric T. Schneiderman, Attorney General for the State of New York, Plaintiffs v. RD Legal Funding, LLC; RD Legal Funding Partners, LP; and Roni Dersovitz, Defendants
- Decided: June 21, 2018
- Docket nos.: 1:17-cv-00890
- Citation: 332 F. Supp. 3d 729

Court membership
- Judge sitting: Loretta A. Preska

Consumer Financial Protection Bureau v. RD Legal Funding, LLC, 332 F. Supp. 3d 729 (S.D.N.Y. 2018), is a lawsuit by the Consumer Financial Protection Bureau (CFPB) and the Attorney General of New York against Defendants RD Legal Funding, LLC, RD Legal Finance, LLC, RD Legal Funding Partners, LP and Roni Dersovitz, the founder and owner of the RD Entities. On June 21, 2018, Senior U.S. District Judge Loretta Preska posited that Title X of the Dodd–Frank Wall Street Reform and Consumer Protection Act, which established the CFPB as an independent bureau within the Federal Reserve System, was unconstitutional. On appeal, the Second Circuit vacated the district court's judgment and remanded for further proceedings.
