= Quantum Capital Group =

Houston, Texas-based private equity firm

- Industry: Energy
- Founded: 1998
- Founder: S. Wil VanLoh, Jr.
- Headquarters: 800 Capitol Street; Suite 3600, Houston, Texas, US
- Key people: S. Wil VanLoh, Jr. (Founder & CEO)
- Website: www.quantumcap.com

Quantum Capital Group, previously known as Quantum Energy Partners, is a Houston, Texas-based private equity firm focused on the energy industry.

== History ==
The company was co-founded by S. Wil VanLoh, Jr. and Toby Neugebauer in 1998.
