= Bank Holding Company Act =

American law regulating corporations

- Other short titles: Distributions Pursuant to Bank Holding Company Act of 1956
- Long title: An Act to define bank holding companies, control their future expansion, and require divestment of their nonbanking interests.
- Nicknames: Bank Holding Company Act of 1956
- Enacted by: the 84th United States Congress
- Effective: May 9, 1956

Citations
- Public law: 84-511
- Statutes at Large: 70 Stat. 133

Codification
- Titles amended: 12 U.S.C.: Banks and Banking
- U.S.C. sections created: 12 U.S.C. ch. 17 § 1841 et seq.

Legislative history
- Introduced in the House as H.R. 6227; Passed the House on June 14, 1955 (371–24); Passed the Senate on April 24, 1956 (58–18, in lieu of S. 2577); Signed into law by President Dwight D. Eisenhower on May 9, 1956

The Bank Holding Company Act of 1956 (12 U.S.C. § 1841, et seq.) is a United States Act of Congress that regulates the actions of bank holding companies.

The original law (subsequently amended), specified that the Federal Reserve Board of Governors must approve the establishment of a bank holding company and that bank holding companies headquartered in one state are banned from acquiring a bank in another state. The law was implemented, in part, to regulate and control banks that had formed bank holding companies to own both banking and non-banking businesses. The law generally prohibited a bank holding company from engaging in most non-banking activities or acquiring voting securities of certain companies that are not banks.

The interstate restrictions of the Bank Holding Company act were repealed by the Riegle–Neal Interstate Banking and Branching Efficiency Act of 1994 (IBBEA). The IBBEA allowed interstate mergers between "adequately capitalized and managed banks, subject to concentration limits, state laws and Community Reinvestment Act (CRA) evaluations."

In the United States, financial holding companies continue to be prohibited from owning non-financial corporations in contrast to Japan and continental Europe, where this arrangement is common.

Private equity firms, which solicit funds but are not classified as banks and, more importantly, are not backstopped by the Federal Deposit Insurance Corporation, may acquire large ownership positions in a number of non-bank corporations. That is not a problem since private equity firms are not banks.

== Proposed new limits on bank activities in physical commodities ==
On September 23, 2016, the Federal Reserve Board of Governors (Board) issued a Notice of Proposed Rulemaking concerning whether to impose new restrictions on the activities of banks related to physical commodities. The proposed rule would:

- increase capital requirements for activities of Financial Holding Companies (FHCs) involving commodities for which existing laws would impose liability if the commodities were released into the environment;
- lower the limit on the amount of physical commodities that may be held by banks that conduct commodity trading activities;
- rescind authority for banks to engage in energy tolling and energy management services;
- delete copper from the list of precious metals that Bank Holding Companies (BHCs) are permitted to own and store; and
- establish new public reporting requirements on the nature and extent of firms’ physical commodities holdings and activities.

Additionally under a report was issued pursuant to Section 620 of the Dodd-Frank Act. (620 Report), which includes recommendations for legislation to repeal several current authorities for banks to engage in physical commodities activities.

Under the 620 Report the Board recommends legislative action that would:

- repeal the authority of FHCs to engage in merchant banking activities; and
- repeal the grandfather authority for certain FHCs to engage in commodities activities under section 4(o) of the Bank Holding Company Act.

== Sources ==
- FDIC Important Banking Legislation (2004).
