= Bank secrecy =

Agreement between a bank and its clients that activities remain private

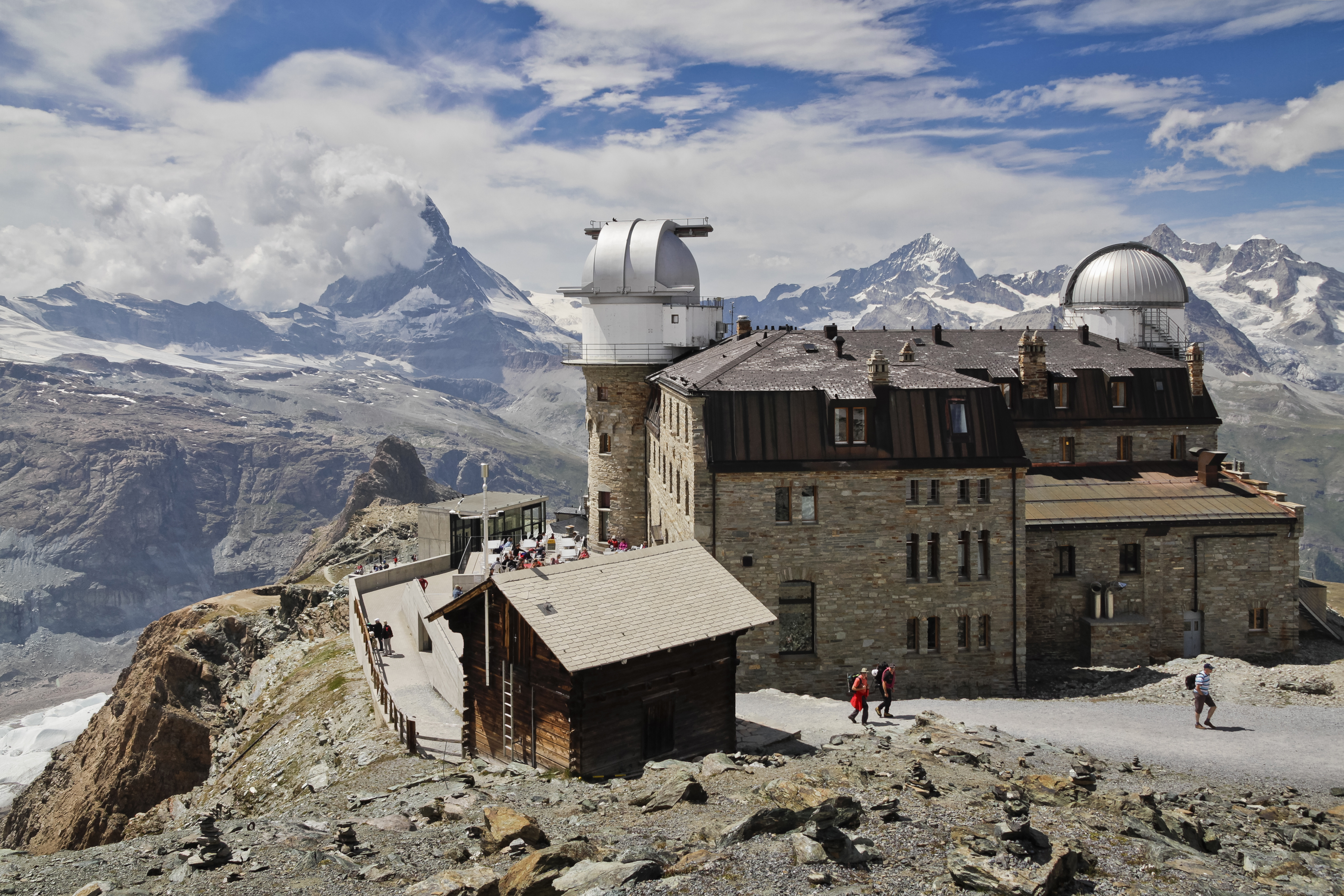
Switzerland is known for its bank secrecy and strict bank–client confidentiality. Pictured: the Swiss Alps, the location of many underground storage bunkers for gold.

Banking secrecy, alternatively known as financial privacy, banking discretion, or bank safety, is a conditional agreement between a bank and its clients that all foregoing activities remain secure, confidential, and private. Most often associated with banking in Switzerland, banking secrecy is prevalent in Luxembourg, Monaco, Hong Kong, Singapore, Ireland, and Lebanon, among other off-shore banking institutions.

Otherwise known as bank–client confidentiality or banker–client privilege, the practice was started by Italian merchants during the 1600s near Northern Italy (a region that would become the Italian-speaking region of Switzerland). Geneva bankers established secrecy socially and through civil law in the French-speaking region during the 1700s. Swiss banking secrecy was first codified with the Banking Act of 1934, thus making it a crime to disclose client information to third parties without a client's consent. The law, coupled with a stable Swiss currency and international neutrality, prompted large capital flight to private Swiss accounts. During the 1940s, numbered bank accounts were introduced creating an enduring principle of bank secrecy that continues to be considered one of the main aspects of private banking globally. Advances in financial cryptography (via public-key cryptography) could make it possible to use anonymous electronic money and anonymous digital bearer certificates for financial privacy and anonymous Internet banking, given enabling institutions and secure computer systems.

While some banking institutions voluntarily impose banking secrecy institutionally, others operate in regions where the practice is legally mandated and protected (e.g. off-shore financial centers). Almost all banking secrecy standards prohibit the disclosure of client information to third parties without consent or an accepted criminal complaint. Additional privacy is provided to select clients via numbered bank accounts or underground bank vaults.

Recent research has indicated that the use of offshore financial centers has been of concern because criminals get involved with them. It is argued that these financial centers enable the actions of criminals. However, there have been attempts by global institutions to regulate money laundering and illegal activities.

== Links to financial crime ==
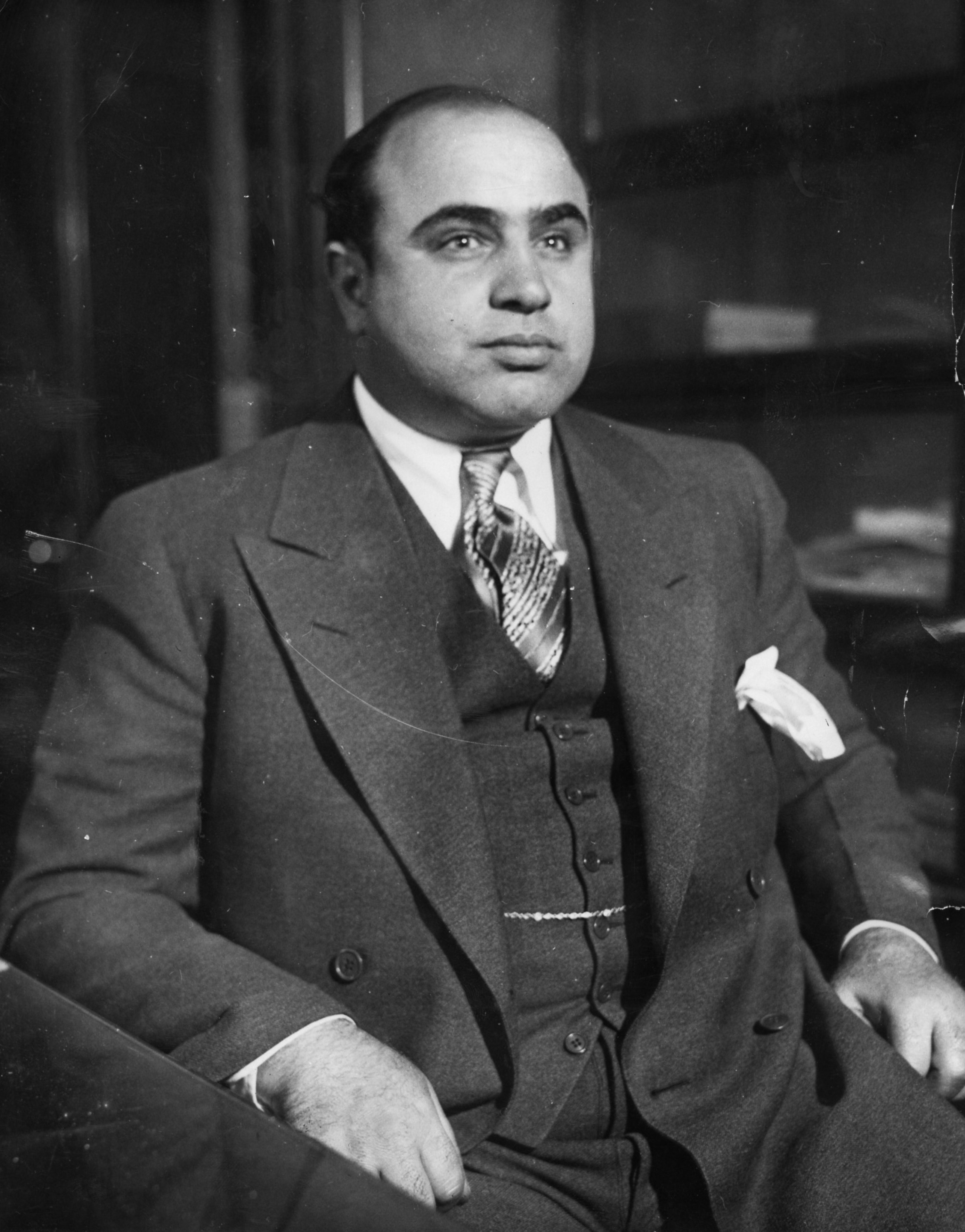
Mobster Al Capone was charged with and prosecuted for income tax evasion in the 1930s.

Numbered bank accounts, used by Swiss banks and other offshore banks located in tax havens, have been accused by the international community of being a major instrument of the underground economy, facilitating tax evasion and money laundering. After Al Capone's 1931 condemnation for tax evasion, according to journalist Lucy Komisar:

mobster Meyer Lansky took money from New Orleans slot machines and shifted it to accounts overseas. The Swiss secrecy law two years later assured him of G-man-proof-banking. Later, he bought a Swiss bank and for years deposited his Havana casino take in Miami accounts, then wired the funds to Switzerland via a network of shell and holding companies and offshore accounts.

Economist and Nobel Prize laureate Joseph Stiglitz, told Komisar:

You ask why, if there's an important role for a regulated banking system, do you allow a non-regulated banking system to continue? It's in the interest of some of the moneyed interests to allow this to occur. It's not an accident; it could have been shut down at any time. If you said the US, the UK, the major G7 banks will not deal with offshore bank centers that don't comply with G7 banks regulations, these banks could not exist. They only exist because they engage in transactions with standard banks.

A 2024 opinion piece of the Philippine Daily Inquirer opines that the highly restrictive provisions of the bank secrecy law of the Philippines, the Republic Act No. 1405 of 1955, is responsible for the prevalence of corruption in the country and the country's inclusion in the "gray list" of the Financial Action Task Force.

== See also ==
- Tangier International Zone
- Numbered bank accounts
- Safe deposit box
- Financial privacy laws in the United States
- Privacy

== Bibliography ==
- Guex, Sébastien. 2000. "The Origins of the Swiss Banking Secrecy Law and Its Repercussions for Swiss Federal Policy". Business History Review. pp. 237–266.
