= Title 12 of the United States Code =

U.S. federal statutes on banks

Title 12 of the United States Code outlines the role of Banks and Banking in the United States Code.

- Chapter 1: The Comptroller of the Currency
- Chapter 2: National Banks
- Chapter 3: Federal Reserve System
- Chapter 4: Taxation
- Chapter 5: Crimes And Offenses
- Chapter 6: Foreign Banking
- Chapter 6a: Export-Import Bank of the United States
- Chapter 7: Farm Credit Administration
- Chapter 7a: Agricultural Marketing
- Chapter 7b: Regional Agricultural Credit Corporations
- Chapter 8: Adjustment and Cancellation of Farm Loans
- Chapter 9: National Agricultural Credit Corporations
- Chapter 10: Local Agricultural-Credit Corporations, Livestock-Loan Companies and Like Organizations; Loans to Individuals to Aid in Formation or to Increase Capital Stock
- Chapter 11: Federal Home Loan Banks
- Chapter 11a: Federal Home Loan Mortgage Corporation
- Chapter 12: Savings Associations
- Chapter 13: National Housing
- Chapter 14: Federal Credit Unions
- Chapter 15: Federal Loan Agency
- Chapter 16: Federal Deposit Insurance Corporation
- Chapter 17: Bank Holding Companies
- Chapter 18: Bank Service Companies
- Chapter 19: Security Measures for Banks and Savings Associations
- Chapter 20: Credit Control
- Chapter 21: Financial Recordkeeping
- Chapter 22: Tying Arrangements
- Chapter 23: Farm Credit System
- Chapter 24: Federal Financing Bank
- Chapter 25: National Commission on Electronic Fund Transfers
- Chapter 26: Disposition of Abandoned Money Orders and Traveler's Checks
- Chapter 27: Real Estate Settlement Procedures
- Chapter 28: Emergency Mortgage Relief
- Chapter 29: Home Mortgage Disclosure
- Chapter 30: Community Reinvestment
- Chapter 31: National Consumer Cooperative Bank
- Chapter 32: Foreign Bank Participation in Domestic Markets
- Chapter 33: Depository institution Management Interlocks
- Chapter 34: Federal Financial Institutions Examination Council
- Chapter 34a: Appraisal Subcommittee of Federal Financial Institutions Examination Council
- Chapter 35: Right to Financial Privacy
- Chapter 36: Depository Institutions Deregulation and Financial Regulation Simplification
- Chapter 37: Solar Energy and Energy Conservation Bank
- Chapter 38: Multifamily Mortgage Foreclosure
- Chapter 38a: Single Family Mortgage Foreclosure
- Chapter 39: Alternative Mortgage Transactions2
- Chapter 40: International Lending Supervision
- Chapter 41: Expedited Funds Availability
- Chapter 42: Low-Income Housing Preservation and Resident Homeownership
- Chapter 43: Actions Against Persons Committing Bank Fraud Crimes
- Chapter 44: Truth in Savings
- Chapter 45: Payment System Risk Reduction
- Chapter 46: Government Sponsored Enterprises
- Chapter 47: Community Development Banking
- Chapter 48: Financial Institutions Regulatory Improvement
- Chapter 49: Homeowners Protection
- Chapter 50: Check Truncation
- Chapter 51: Secure and Fair Enforcement for Mortgage Licensing
- Chapter 52: Emergency Economic Stabilization
- Chapter 53: Wall Street Reform and Consumer Protection
- Chapter 54: State Small Business Credit Initiative
- Chapter 55: Adjustable Interest Rate (LIBOR)
