= Glass–Steagall in post-financial crisis reform debate =

There have been several efforts or appeals in the United States to reinstate repealed sections of the Glass–Steagall Act following the 2008 financial crisis, as well as elsewhere to adopt similar financial reforms.

== Efforts to restore Sections 20 and 32 as part of Dodd–Frank ==
During the 2009 United States House of Representatives consideration of H.R. 4173, the bill that became the Dodd-Frank Wall Street Reform and Consumer Protection Act of 2010, Representative Maurice Hinchey (D-NY) proposed an amendment to the bill that would have reenacted Glass–Steagall Sections 20 and 32, which had been repealed by the 1999 Gramm–Leach–Bliley Act (GLBA), and also prohibited bank insurance activities. The amendment was not voted on by the House.

On December 16, 2009, Senators John McCain (R-AZ) and Maria Cantwell (D-WA) introduced in the United States Senate the "Banking Integrity Act of 2009" (S.2886), which would have reinstated Glass–Steagall Sections 20 and 32, but was not voted on by the Senate.

Before the Senate acted on its version of what became the Dodd–Frank Act, the Congressional Research Service issued a report describing securities activities banks and their affiliates had conducted before the GLBA. The Report stated Glass–Steagall had "imperfectly separated, to a certain degree" commercial and investment banking and described the extensive securities activities the Federal Reserve Board had authorized for "Section 20 affiliates" since the 1980s.

The Obama Administration has been criticized for opposing Glass–Steagall reenactment. In 2009, Treasury Secretary Timothy Geithner testified to the Joint Economic Committee that he opposed reenacting Glass–Steagall and that he did not believe "the end of Glass–Steagall played a significant role" in causing the 2008 financial crisis.

== Post-2010 efforts ==
On April 12, 2011, Representative Marcy Kaptur (D-OH) introduced in the House the "Return to Prudent Banking Act of 2011" (H.R. 129), which would have (1) amended the Federal Deposit Insurance Act to add prohibitions on FDIC insured bank affiliations instead of reenacting the affiliation restrictions in Glass–Steagall Sections 20 and 32, (2) directed federal banking regulators and courts to interpret these affiliation provisions and Glass–Steagall Sections 16 and 21 in accordance with the Supreme Court decision in Investment Company Institute v. Camp, and (3) repealed various GLBA changes to the Bank Holding Company Act. The bill was reported to a House subcommittees but not further acted upon before the 112th Congress adjourned.

On May 16, 2013, Senator Tom Harkin (D-IA) introduced S. 985 to restore the original Glass-Steagall Act, on the 80th anniversary of the original act. On July 13, 2013, Senator Elizabeth Warren (D-MA) introduced alongside John McCain (R-AZ), Maria Cantwell (D-WA), and Angus King (I-ME) the 21st Century Glass–Steagall Act (S.1282). Warren wrote in a press release: "The 21st Century Glass-Steagall Act will reestablish a wall between commercial and investment banking, make our financial system more stable and secure, and protect American families." Instead of restoring repealed Glass–Steagall sections 20 and 32, the bill would

1. separate traditional banks that offer savings and checking accounts insured by the Federal Deposit Insurance Corporation from riskier financial services like investment banking, swaps dealings, hedge funds and private equity activities, as well as from structured and synthetic products, and other products, that did not exist when Glass–Steagall was originally passed.
2. define the "business of banking" to prevent national banks from engaging in risky activities and bars non-banking activities from being treated as "closely related" to banking. These restriction would counter regulatory loopholes for risky activities, because the Office of the Comptroller of the Currency and the Federal Reserve used these terms to allow traditional banks and bank-holding companies to engage in high-risk activities.
3. address the issue of too big to fail: by separating depositary institutions from riskier activities, large financial institutions will shrink in size, become smaller and safer and won't be able to rely on federal depository insurance as a safety net for their risky activities. Although some financial institutions may still be large, the implicit government guarantee of a bailout will be reduced because such institutions would no longer be intertwined with depository institutions.
4. institutes a five years transition period and penalties for any violation.

Many of her colleagues remain opposed, such as the Senators from Delaware, home to the corporate offices of many major banks.

== Volcker rule as "Glass–Steagall lite" ==
The Dodd–Frank Act included the Volcker Rule, which among other things limited proprietary trading by banks and their affiliates. This proprietary trading ban was to generally prevent commercial banks and their affiliates from acquiring non-governmental securities with the intention of selling those securities for a profit in the "near term." Some in 2010, have described the Volcker Rule, particularly its proprietary trading ban, as "Glass–Steagall lite."

As described in prohibitions apply to dealing in and underwriting or distributing securities, Glass–Steagall restricted commercial bank "dealing" in, not "trading" of, non-government securities the bank was permitted to purchase as "investment securities." After the GLBA became law, Glass–Steagall Section 16 continued to restrict bank securities purchases. The GLBA, however, expanded the list of "bank-eligible" securities to permit banks to buy, underwrite, and deal in municipal revenue bonds, not only "full faith and credit" government bonds.

The Volcker Rule permits "market making" and other "dealer" activities in non-government securities as services for customers. Glass–Steagall Section 16 prohibits banks from being a "market maker" or otherwise "dealing" in non-government (i.e., "bank-ineligible") securities. Glass–Steagall Section 16 permits a bank to purchase and sell (i.e., permits "trading") for a bank's own account non-government securities that the OCC approves as "investment securities." The Volcker Rule will prohibit such "proprietary trading" of non-government securities.

Before and after the 2008 financial crisis, banking regulators worried that banks were incorrectly reporting non-traded assets as held in their "trading account" because of lower regulatory capital requirements for assets held in a "trading account." Under the Volcker Rule, U.S. banking regulators have proposed that banks and their affiliates be prohibited from holding any asset (other than government securities and other listed exceptions) as a "trading position."

In 2011, Senators Jeff Merkley (D-OR) and Carl Levin (D-MI) wrote that "proprietary trading losses" played "a central role in bringing the financial system to its knees." They wrote that the Volcker Rule's proprietary trading ban contained in statutory language they proposed is a "modern Glass–Steagall" because Glass–Steagall was both "over-inclusive" (in prohibiting some "truly client-oriented activities that could be managed by developments in securities and banking law") and "under-inclusive" in failing to cover derivatives trading.

In 2002, Arthur Wilmarth wrote, that from 1990 to 1997 the nine U.S. banks with the greatest securities activities held more than 20% of their assets as trading assets. By 1997, 40% of J.P. Morgan's revenue was from trading. A 1995 study by the federal banking regulators of commercial bank trading activity from June 30, 1984, to June 30, 1994, concluded that "trading activities are an increasingly important source of revenue for banks" and that "[n]otwithstanding the numerous press reports that focus on negative events, the major commercial banks have experienced long-term success in serving customers and generating revenues with these activities." In reporting the study results, the American Banker described "proprietary trading" as "basically securities trading not connected to customer-related bank activities" and summarized the study as finding that "proprietary trading has been getting a bad rap."

Paul Volcker supported the Volcker Rule prohibition on proprietary trading as part of bringing commercial banks back to "concentrating on continuing customer interest." As described in the article Decline of the Glass–Steagall Act, Volcker had long testified to Congress in support of repealing Glass–Steagall Sections 20 and 32. In 2010 he explained that he understood Glass–Steagall as preventing banks from being principally engaged in underwriting and dealing in corporate securities. Volcker stated that with securitization and other developments he believes it is a proper bank function to underwrite corporate securities "as serving a legitimate customer need." He, therefore, did not believe "repeal of Glass–Steagall was terrible" but that Congress "should have thought about what they replace it with." Volcker's criticism was that Congress "didn't replace it with other restrictions."

Separate from its proprietary trading ban, the Volcker Rule restricts bank and affiliate sponsorship and ownership of hedge funds and private equity funds. The GLBA amended the Bank Holding Company Act to permit "merchant banking" investments by bank affiliates subject to various restrictions. It also authorized the Treasury Department and Federal Reserve Board to permit such merchant banking activities by direct bank subsidiaries ("financial subsidiaries") after five years, but they have not provided such permission. This was not a Glass–Steagall change but a change to the Bank Holding Company Act, which previously limited the size of investments bank affiliates could make in a company engaged in activities not "closely related to banking." Such merchant banking investments may be made through private equity funds. The Volcker Rule will affect the ability of bank affiliates to make such investments.

== Other reform proposals that have been compared to Glass–Steagall ==
Both in the US and elsewhere, a number of reform proposals have been put forward that bear some resemblance to Glass–Steagall.

=== "Ring fencing" proposals ===
In the UK, the Independent Commission on Banking's (ICB) proposal to "ring fence" retail and small business commercial banking from investment banking seeks to isolate the "retail banking" functions of a banking firm within a separate corporation that would not be affected by the failure of the overall firm so long as the "ring fenced" retail bank itself remained solvent. Bank of England Governor Mervyn King expressed concern the European Commission could block implementation of the ICB proposal as a violation of Commission standards. Although Michel Barnier, European Union internal market Commissioner, proposed limits on capital requirements for banks that could have hindered the UK ring fencing proposal and indicated support for the French and German position against breaking up banking groups, in November 2011 he announced an "expert commission" would "study the mandatory separation of risky investment banking activities from traditional retail lenders."

In 2016 it was reported that Bank of England "would press ahead with plans for banks to ringfence their retail operations by 2019".

On October 2, 2012, the EU committee appointed to study the issue, through its Liikanen report, recommended a form of "ring fencing" similar to the proposal in the United Kingdom. In April 2013 the Bank for International Settlements has issued a working paper comparing the Volcker Rule, the ICB proposals, the Liikanen report proposals, and other international proposals for bank structural reform.

==== Debate on "firewalls" ====
Congressional and bank regulator efforts to "repeal", "reform" or apply Glass–Steagall were based on isolating a commercial banking firm's expanded securities activities in a separately capitalized bank affiliate. Much of the debate concerned whether such affiliates could be owned by a bank (as with "operating subsidiaries" in the 1990s) or would be bank holding company subsidiaries outside the chain of bank ownership. In either case, "firewalls" were intended to isolate the bank from the affiliate.

Banking regulators and commentators debated whether "firewalls" could truly separate a bank from its affiliate in a crisis and often cited the early 1980s' statement by then Citicorp CEO Walter Wriston that "it is inconceivable that any major bank would walk away from any subsidiary of its holding company." Alan Greenspan and Paul Volcker testified to Congress that firewalls so strong that they truly separated different businesses would eliminate the benefits of combining the two activities. Both testified that in a crisis the owners of the overall firm would inevitably find ways to use the assets of any solvent part of the firm to assist the troubled part. Thus, "firewalls" sufficient to prevent a bank from assisting its affiliate would eliminate the purpose of the combination, but "workable" firewalls would be insufficient to prevent such assistance. Both Volcker and Greenspan proposed that the solution was adequate supervision, including sufficient capital and other requirements.

In 1998 and 1999 Greenspan testified to Congress in opposition to the Clinton Administration proposal to permit national bank subsidiaries to engage in expanded securities and other activities. He argued such direct bank subsidiary activities would be "financed by the sovereign credit of the United States" through the "federal safety net" for banks, despite the Treasury Department's assurance that "firewalls" between the bank and its operating subsidiary would prevent the expansion of the "federal safety net."

As described in commentator response to Section 20 and 32 repeal, Gary Stern, Arthur Wilmarth, and others questioned whether either operating subsidiaries or separate holding company affiliates could be isolated from an affiliated bank in a financial crisis and feared that the "too big to fail" doctrine gave competitive benefits to banking firms entering the securities or insurance business through either structure. Greenspan did not deny that the government might act to "manage an orderly liquidation" of a large financial "intermediary" in a crisis, but he suggested that only insured creditors would be fully repaid, that shareholders would be unprotected, and that uninsured creditors would receive less than full payment through a discount or "haircut." Commentators pointed to the 1990 failure of Drexel Burnham Lambert as suggesting "too-big-to-fail" considerations need not force a government rescue of creditors to a failing investment bank or other nonbank, although Greenspan had pointed to that experience as questioning the ability of firewalls to isolate one part of a financial firm from the rest.

After the 2008 financial crisis, commentators noted that the Federal Reserve Board used its power to grant exemptions from Federal Reserve Act Section 23A (part of the 1933 Banking Act and the "principle statutory" firewall between banks and their affiliates) to permit banks to "rescue" various affiliates or bank sponsored participants in the "shadow banking system" as part of a general effort to restore liquidity in financial markets. Section 23A generally prevented banks from funding securities purchases by their affiliates before the 2008 financial crisis (i.e., prevented the affiliates from "using insured deposits to purchase risky investments") by "limiting the ability of depository institutions to transfer to affiliates the subsidy arising from the institutions' access to the federal safety net," but the Federal Reserve Board's exemptions allowed banks to transfer such investments from the shadow banking market to FDIC insured banks during the crisis. The Federal Reserve Board's General Counsel has defended these actions by arguing that all the Section 23A exemptions required that bank funding of affiliate or shadow banking investments be "fully collateralized" on a daily basis with qualifying collateral, so that the bank was "very much protected," and that in the end the exemptions did not prove very "useful."

The ICB proposes to erect a barrier between the "ring-fenced bank" and its "wider corporate group" that will permit banking regulators to isolate the ring-fenced bank "from the rest of the group in a matter of days and continue the provision of its services without providing solvency support."

=== Limited purpose banking and narrow banking ===
Laurence Kotlikoff was disappointed the ICB did not adopt the "limited purpose banking" he proposed to the ICB. This would require a bank to operate like a mutual fund in repaying "deposits" based on the current market value of the bank's assets. Kotlikoff argues there will always be financial crises if banks lend deposits but are required to repay the full amount of those deposits "on demand." Kotlikoff would only permit a bank (restructured as a mutual fund) to promise payment of deposits at "par" (i.e., $1 for every $1 deposited) if the bank (i.e., mutual fund) held 100% of all deposits in cash as a trustee.

As Kotlikoff notes, in 1987 Robert Litan proposed "narrow banking." Litan suggested commercial banking firms be freed from Glass–Steagall limits (and other activity restrictions) so long as they isolated FDIC insured deposits in a "narrow bank" that was only permitted to invest those deposits in "safe securities" approved by the FDIC. In 1995 Arthur Wilmarth proposed applying Litan's "narrow bank" proposal to U.S. banks ("global banks") that had become heavily involved in "capital markets" activities through "Section 20 affiliates," derivatives, and other activities. Under Wilmarth's proposal (which he repeated in 2001 after the GLBA became law) only banks that limited their activities to taking deposits and making commercial loans would be permitted to make commercial loans with FDIC insured deposits. Wilmarth expected only "community banks" specialized in making consumer and small business loans would continue to operate as such traditional banks. The large "global banks" would fund their lending through the capital markets just like investment banks and other "shadow banking" lenders.

==== Narrow banking and wholesale financial institutions ====
The Litan and Wilmarth proposals were very different from the Kotlikoff limited purpose banking proposal in that they would only limit the activities of companies that owned FDIC insured banks. Whereas Kotlikoff would require a company to hold the full amount of its "demand deposits" in cash, Litan and Wilmarth would permit companies to issue such "demand deposits" without restriction, so long as the demand deposits were not FDIC insured. Congress considered this type of proposal when it debated the repeal of Glass-Steagall sections 20 and 32.

In 1997 the Clinton Administration proposed that "wholesale financial institutions" (known as "woofies") be authorized to be members of the Federal Reserve System but not "banks" under the Bank Holding Company Act because they would own non-FDIC insured banks that would only take deposits of $100,000 or more. Whereas "narrow banks" would be FDIC insured, but only invest in FDIC approved "safe securities," "woofies" would be free to lend, purchase securities, and make other investments, because they would not hold any FDIC insured deposits. The proposal was intended to permit securities firms to continue to maintain ownership of commercial firms while gaining access to the Federal Reserve's "payment system" and "discount window", so long as the firm did not take FDIC insured deposits.

"Woofies" were not authorized by the GLBA because of a dispute between Senator Phil Gramm and the Clinton Administration over the application of the Community Reinvestment Act (CRA) to "woofies." In their October 1999 compromise on CRA provisions in the GLBA, the Clinton Administration agreed with Gramm that CRA would not apply to woofies so long as only a company that did not then own any FDIC insured depository institution would be permitted to qualify as a "wholesale financial institution." The Clinton Administration wanted this restriction to prevent existing bank holding companies from disposing of their FDIC insured banks to qualify as "woofies," which could reduce the deposit base subject to CRA requirements. When Chase and J.P. Morgan lobbied to change the final legislation to permit them to become woofies, they complained only Goldman Sachs and "a few others" could qualify as a woofie. When negotiators decided they could not resolve the dispute, permission for woofies was eliminated from the final GLBA.

"Woofies" were similar to the "global bank" structure suggested by Arthur Wilmarth because they would not use FDIC insured deposits to make commercial loans. They would, however, be subject to Federal Reserve supervision unlike lenders in the unsupervised "shadow banking" system. Because woofies would have had access to the Federal Reserve discount window and payments service, critics (including the Independent Bankers Association of America and Paul Volcker) opposed woofies (and a similar 1996 proposal by Representative James A. Leach) for providing unfair competition to banks. Although October 1999 press reports suggested bank holding companies were interested in becoming woofies, the New York Times reported in July 1999 that banking and securities firms had lost interest in becoming woofies.

=== Shadow banking in financial reform proposals ===
The ICB Report rejected "narrow banking" in part because it would lead to more credit (and all credit during times of stress) being provided by a "less regulated sector." In 1993 Jane D'Arista and Tom Schlesinger noted that the "parallel banking system" had grown because it did not incur the regulatory costs of commercial banks. They proposed to equalize the cost by establishing "uniform regulation" of banks and the lenders and investors in the parallel banking system. As with Kotlikoff's "limited purpose banking" proposal, only investment pools funded 100% from equity interests would remain unregulated as banks. Although D'Arista and Schlesinger acknowledged the regulation of banks and of the parallel banking system would end up only being "comparable," their goal was to eliminate so far as possible the competitive advantages of the "parallel" or "shadow" banking market.

Many commentators have argued that the failure to regulate the shadow banking market was a primary cause of the 2008 financial crisis. There is general agreement that the crisis emerged in the shadow banking markets not in the traditional banking market. As described in the article Decline of the Glass–Steagall Act, Helen Garten had identified the "consumerization" of banking regulation as producing "a largely unregulated, sophisticated wholesale market," which created the risk of the "underproduction of regulation" of that market.

Laurence Kotlikoff's "limited purpose banking" proposal rejects bank regulation (based on rules and supervision to ensure "safety and soundness") and replaces it with a prohibition on any company operating like a traditional "bank." All limited liability financial companies (not only today's "banks") that receive money from the public for investment or "lending" and that issue promises to pay amounts in the future (whether as insurance companies, hedge funds, securities firms, or otherwise) could only issue obligations to repay amounts equal to the value of their assets. All "depositors" in or "lenders" to such companies would become "investors" (as in a mutual fund) with the right to receive the full return on the investments made by the companies (minus fees) and obligated to bear the full loss on those investments.

Thomas Hoenig rejects both "limited purpose banking" and the proposal to regulate shadow banking as part of the banking system. Hoenig argues it is not necessary to regulate "shadow banking system" lenders as banks if those lenders are prohibited from issuing liabilities that function like bank demand deposits. He suggests that requiring money market funds to redeem shares at the funds' fluctuating daily net asset values would prevent those funds from functioning like bank checking accounts and that eliminating special Bankruptcy Code treatment for repurchase agreements would delay repayment of those transactions in a bankruptcy and thereby end their treatment as "cash equivalents" when the "repo" was funding illiquid, long term securities. By limiting the ability of "shadow banks" to compete with traditional banks in creating "money-like" instruments, Hoenig hopes to better assure that the safety net is not ultimately called upon to "bail them [i.e., shadow banks such as Bear Stearns and AIG during the financial crisis] out in a crisis." He proposes to deal with actual commercial banks by imposing "Glass–Steagall-type boundaries" so that banks "that have access to the safety net should be restricted to certain core activities that the safety net was intended to protect—making loans and taking deposits—and related activities consistent with the presence of the safety net."

=== Glass–Steagall references in financial reform proposals ===
Although the UK's ICB and the commentators presenting the proposals described above to modify banks or banking regulation address issues beyond the scope of the Glass–Steagall separation of commercial and investment banking, each specifically examines Glass–Steagall. The ICB stated Glass–Steagall had been "undermined in part by the development of derivatives." The ICB also argued that the development before 1999 of "the world's leading investment banks out of the US despite Glass–Steagall in place at the time" should caution against assuming the "activity restrictions" it recommended in its "ring fencing" proposal would hinder UK investment banks from competing internationally.

Boston University economist Laurence J. Kotlikoff suggests commercial banks only became involved with CDOs, SIVs, and other "risky products" after Glass–Steagall was "repealed," but he rejects Glass–Steagall reinstatement (after suggesting Paul Volcker favors it) as a "non-starter" because it would give the "nonbank/shadow bank/investment bank industry" a "competitive advantage" without requiring it to pay for the "implicit" "lender-of-last-resort" protection it receives from the government. Robert Litan and Arthur Wilmarth presented their "narrow bank" proposals as a basis for eliminating Glass–Steagall (and other) restrictions on bank affiliates. Writing in 1993, Jane D'Artista and Tom Schlesinger noted that "the ongoing integration of financial industry activities makes it increasingly difficult to separate banking and securities operations meaningfully" but rejected Glass–Steagall repeal because "the separation of banking and securities functions is a proven, least-cost method of preventing the problems of one financial sector from spilling over into the other" (which they stated was "most recently demonstrated in the October 1987 market crash.")

During the Senate debate of the bill that became the Dodd–Frank Act, Thomas Hoenig wrote Senators Maria Cantwell and John McCain (the co-sponsors of legislation to reinstate Glass–Steagall Sections 20 and 32) supporting a "substantive debate" on "the unintended consequences of leaving investment banking commingled with commercial banking" and reiterating that he had "long supported" reinstating "Glass–Steagall-type laws" to separate "higher risk, often more leveraged, activities of investment banks" from commercial banking. As described above in post 2010 efforts to enact Glass–Steagall inspired financial reform legislation Elizabeth Warren and other senators have joined Cantwell and McCain in their effort to legislate Glass–Steagall inspired restrictions. Hoenig agreed with Paul Volcker, however, that "financial market developments" had caused underwriting corporate bonds (the prohibition of which Volcker described as the purpose of Glass–Steagall), and also underwriting of corporate equity, revenue bonds, and "high quality asset-backed securities," to be "natural extensions of commercial banking." Instead of reinstating Glass–Steagall prohibitions on such underwriting, Hoenig proposed restoring "the principles underlying the separation of commercial and investment banking firms."

In Mainland Europe, some scholars have suggested Glass–Steagall should be a model for any in-depth reform of bank regulation: notably in France where SFAF and World Pensions Council (WPC) banking experts have argued that "a new Glass–Steagall Act" should be viewed within the broader context of separation of powers in European Union law.

This perspective has gained ground after the unraveling of the Libor scandal in July 2012, with mainstream opinion leaders such as the Financial Times editorialists calling for the adoption of an EU-wide "Glass Steagall II".

On July 25, 2012, former Citigroup Chairman and CEO Sandy Weill, considered one of the driving forces behind the considerable financial deregulation and "mega-mergers" of the 1990s, surprised financial analysts in Europe and North America by "calling for splitting up the commercial banks from the investment banks. In effect, he says: bring back the Glass–Steagall Act of 1933 which led to half a century, free of financial crises." However, Weill reversed his position a year later, arguing that "big banks don't have to be split if the 'right regulation' is in place," and instead that "[banks] should decide on their own to 'split if they figure that's the best way that they can provide their services.'"

== See also ==
- Gramm–Leach–Bliley Act
- Securities regulation in the United States
