= SFAF =

SFAF may refer to:

- Société Française des Analystes Financiers, the French Society of Financial Analysts
- San Francisco AIDS Foundation, non-profit organization
- Success for All Foundation, educational non-profit organization
