= CEBA =

CEBA or Ceba may refer to:

- Canada Emergency Business Account, a temporary business assistance program during the COVID-19 pandemic
- Competitive Equality Banking Act, a 1987 law in the United States
- Ceva, an Italian town known as Ceba in ancient times
- Ceba, a settlement in Hudson Bay No. 394, Saskatchewan
