= Occupy the SEC =

- Part of the "Occupy" protests
- Date: October 2011 – ongoing
- Location: New York City, New York, United States
- Caused by: Financial regulatory activity, corporate influence over government, economic inequality, inter alia.
- Methods: Demonstration, activism, correspondence
- Status: Ongoing

Occupy the SEC (OSEC) is an activist group which aims to influence financial regulators to work for the public interest. The "SEC" in its name refers to the US Securities and Exchange Commission, but OSEC's scope covers all financial regulatory activity. OSEC was formed and developed as an outgrowth and working group of Occupy Wall Street.

Among its members are employees or former employees of some of the largest financial firms. They have been described as "a counterweight to the deep-pocket lobbying push" by financial firms against reform.

== History ==
OSEC was founded in October 2011 as a working group of Occupy Wall Street, the protest movement which started in Zuccotti Park in Lower Manhattan on September 17, 2011. After initially meeting on a bench in Zuccotti Park, late October 2011, the group evolved into a bi-weekly "book club" at a diner near the park, and then met weekly in the atrium of 60 Wall Street. The group first gained attention after tackling a response to the proposed Volcker Rule, part of the Dodd-Frank Act of 2010, that would severely limit proprietary trading at commercial banks, similar to the Glass Steagall Act of 1933. OSEC drafted answers to questions regarding the proposed rule, which were included in a 325-page comment letter submitted to the SEC on February 13, 2012.

== Volcker Rule comment letter and follow-up ==
Submitted by OSEC to the U.S. Securities and Exchange Commission on February 13, 2012, the 325-page comment letter was hailed as "amazing", describing how the authors went through the rule "line by line, explaining where it's useless and where it can and should be improved." Others suggested OSEC was doing "the day-in, day-out grind of policymaking—calling legislators, responding to regulatory agencies, learning the issues..." OSEC's comment letter was close to the lengthiest and most detailed of the 16,000 letters sent to the SEC, with the vast majority coming from industry insiders. This letter was cited 284 times by the Federal Reserve Board when the regulations were ultimately put into effect in 2013.

On February 26, 2013, OSEC filed a suit in the Eastern District Court of New York naming the Federal Reserve, the SEC, CFTC, OCC, FDIC, and the U.S. Department of the Treasury calling for implementation of the "Volcker Rule" (Section 619 of the Dodd-Frank Act of 2010).

== Ongoing activities ==
After the Volcker Rule comment letter, the group continued to engage in regulatory matters where it felt that the 99% needed to be represented.

In June 2012, Occupy the SEC submitted a 7-page letter to the Senate Banking Committee prior to JP Morgan CEO Jamie Dimon's testimony.

In December 2012, OSEC submitted an amicus brief in the case of Gabelli v. SEC, in which the Supreme Court will decide when the statute of limitations clock begins for certain fraud actions brought by the government – from the time the fraud was last committed or from the time the fraud was discovered.

On February 15, 2013, OSEC submitted a formal comment letter on money market fund reform to the Financial Stability Oversight Council (FSOC). The letter urged FSOC to move forward with money market reforms, supported the proposals for floating NAVs and buffers to absorb losses but pointed out that broader reforms were required as well. The letter was cited several times by the SEC when they promulgated reforms to market fund regulations.

In July 2013, OSEC submitted an amicus brief to the US Supreme Court regarding overly broad interpretations of securities litigation laws.

In September 2014, OSEC submitted an amicus brief to the US Supreme Court in the case of Omnicare v. Laborers Pension Fund supporting the rights to sue securities issuers and their agents for material misrepresentation.

In March 2015, OSEC filed an amicus brief to the Supreme Court in Bank of America N.A. v. Caulkett, and Bank of America N.A. v. Toledo-Cardona. OSEC also filed comment letters relating to the systemic risks created or propagated by asset managers to the Financial Stability Oversight Council (FSOC) and in May a letter on designation of asset managers as systemically important financial institutions (SIFIs) to the global Financial Stability Board (FSB).

In November 2015, the group submitted a comment letter to the CFTC on aggregate position limits. They also organized an effort to petition Congress to oppose a bill backed by the Koch brothers. It generated over 1,000 letters.

Occupy the SEC submitted an amicus curiae brief to U.S. Supreme Court in Retirement Plans Committee of IBM v. Jander on October 1, 2019. The brief argued that the duty of disclosure under ERISA should not be constrained by securities disclosure laws.

In February 2022, Cory Doctorow cited an OSEC filing opposing bank mergers in a column decrying the lack of antitrust enforcement.

Occupy the SEC continues to submit regulatory comments and similar filings. In January 2024, they filed a comment with the Federal Reserve Board and the U.S. Office of the Comptroller of the Currency regarding capital requirements.

== Reception ==
According to The Economist, Occupy the SEC's "contributions to the debate on regulatory reform (including a tome on the Volcker Rule) have been well-received even by some leading regulators".
