= Aftermath of the repeal of the Glass–Steagall Act =

The Glass–Steagall legislation was enacted by the United States Congress in 1933 as part of the 1933 Banking Act, amended as part of the 1935 Banking Act, and most of it was repealed in 1999 by the Gramm–Leach–Bliley Act (GLBA). Its protections and restrictions had also been chipped away during most of its existence by lenient regulatory interpretations and use of loopholes. After Glass–Steagall's 1999 repeal, there was a great deal of discussion in the banking and securities industries, and among policymakers and economists, about the practical positive and negative changes to the business and consumer environment. Later, as financial crises and other issues played out in the United States and even worldwide, arguments have broken out about whether Glass–Steagall, as originally intended, would have prevented these issues.

== Commentator response to Section 20 and 32 repeal ==
President Bill Clinton's signing statement for the GLBA summarized the established argument for repealing Glass–Steagall Section's 20 and 32 in stating that this change, and the GLBA's amendments to the Bank Holding Company Act, would "enhance the stability of our financial services system" by permitting financial firms to "diversify their product offerings and thus their sources of revenue" and make financial firms "better equipped to compete in global financial markets."

With Salomon Smith Barney already operating as a Section 20 affiliate of Citibank under existing law, commentators did not find much significance in the GLBA's repeal of Sections 20 and 32. Many commentators noted those sections "were dead" before the GLBA.

The GLBA's amendment to the Bank Holding Company Act to permit banks to affiliate with insurance underwriting companies was a new power. Under a 1982 amendment to the Bank Holding Company Act, bank affiliates had been prohibited from underwriting most forms of insurance. Because the GLBA permitted banks to affiliate with insurance underwriters, Citigroup was able to retain ownership of the Travelers insurance underwriting business. Overall, however, commentators viewed the GLBA "as ratifying and extending changes that had already been made, rather than as revolutionary." At least one commentator found the entire GLBA "unnecessary" for banks and suggested the OCC had the authority to grant national banks all the insurance underwriting powers permitted to affiliates through the GLBA.

As John Boyd had earlier, Minneapolis Federal Reserve Bank president Gary Stern and Arthur Wilmarth warned that the GLBA's permission for broader combinations of banking, securities, and insurance activities could increase the "too big to fail" problem.

== Financial industry developments after repeal of Sections 20 and 32 ==
=== Citigroup gives up insurance underwriting ===
The GLBA permitted Citigroup to retain the Travelers property, casualty, and life insurance underwriting businesses beyond the five-year "divestiture" period the Federal Reserve Board could have permitted under the pre-GLBA form of the BHCA. Before that five-year period elapsed, however, Citigroup spun off the Travelers property and casualty insurance business to Citigroup's shareholders. In 2005 Citigroup sold to Metropolitan Life the Travelers life insurance business. Commentators noted that Citigroup was left with selling insurance underwritten by third parties, a business it could have conducted without the GLBA.

=== Banking, insurance, and securities industries remain structurally unchanged ===
In November 2003, the Federal Reserve Board and the Treasury Department issued to Congress a report (Joint Report) on the activities of the "financial holding companies" (FHCs) authorized by the GLBA and the effect of mergers or acquisitions by FHCs on market concentration in the financial services industry. According to the Joint Report, 12% of all bank holding companies had qualified as financial holding companies to exercise the new powers provided by the GLBA, and those companies held 78% of all bank holding company assets. 40 of the 45 bank holding companies with Section 20 affiliates before 2000 had qualified as financial holding companies, and their securities related assets had nearly doubled. The great majority of this increase was at non-U.S. based banks. Such foreign banking companies had acquired several medium-sized securities firms (such as UBS acquiring Paine Webber and Credit Suisse acquiring Donaldson, Lufkin & Jenrette).

Despite these increases in securities activities by bank holding companies that qualified as financial holding companies, the Joint Report found that concentration levels among securities underwriting and dealing firms had not changed significantly since 1999. Ranked by capital levels, none of the four largest securities dealing and underwriting firms was affiliated with a financial holding company. Although the market share of financial holding companies among the 25 largest securities firms had increased by 5.7 percentage points from that held in 1999 before the GLBA became effective, all of the increase came from foreign banks increasing their U.S. securities operations. The combined market share of the five largest U.S. based financial holding companies declined by 1 percentage point from 1999 to 2003, with the largest, Citigroup, experiencing a 2.4 percentage point reduction from 1999 to 2003. Of the 45 bank holding companies that had operated Section 20 affiliates before the GLBA, 40 had qualified as financial holding companies, 2 conducted securities underwriting and dealing through direct bank subsidiaries (i.e., "financial subsidiaries"), and 3 continued to operate Section 20 affiliates subject to pre-GLBA rules.

In a speech delivered shortly before the Joint Report was released, Federal Reserve Board Vice Chairman Roger Ferguson stated that the Federal Reserve had "not been able to uncover any evidence that the overall market structure of the [banking, insurance, and securities] segments of the financial services industry has substantially changed" since the GLBA. Early in 2004, the Financial Times reported that "financial supermarkets" were failing around the world, as both diversification and larger size failed to increase profitability. The Congressional Research Service noted that after the GLBA became law the financial services markets in the United States "had not really integrated" as mergers and consolidations occurred "largely within sectors" without the expected "wholesale integration in financial services."

At a July 13, 2004, Senate Banking Committee hearing on the effects of the GLBA five years after passage, the Legislative Director of the Consumer Federation cited Roger Ferguson's 2003 speech and stated the "extravagant promises" of universal banking had "proven to be mostly hype." He noted that advocates of repealing Sections 20 and 32 had said "[b]anks, securities firms, and insurance companies would merge into financial services supermarkets" and, after five years, some mergers had occurred "but mostly within the banking industry, not across sectors." Within the banking industry, Federal Reserve Board Chairman Alan Greenspan testified to Congress in 2004 that commercial bank consolidation had "slowed sharply in the past five years."

At the five-year anniversary of the GLBA in November 2004, the American Banker quoted then retiring Comptroller of the Currency John D. Hawke Jr. and former FDIC Chairman William Seidman as stating the GLBA had been less significant than expected in not bringing about the combinations of banking, insurance, and investment banking. Hawke described the GLBA provisions permitting such combinations as "pretty much a dead letter." Although the article noted other commentators expected this would change in 2005, a May 24, 2005, American Banker article proclaimed 2005 the "year of divestiture" as "many observers" described Citigroup's sale of the Travelers life and annuity insurance business as "a nail in the coffin of financial services convergence."

In 2005, the St. Louis Federal Reserve Bank's staff issued a study finding that after five years the GLBA's effects "have been modest" and the new law "simply made it easier for organizations to continue to engage in the activities they had already undertaken."

=== Competition between commercial banking and investment banking firms ===
Commentators pointed to the Enron, WorldCom, and other corporate scandals of the early 2000s as exposing the dangers of uniting commercial and investment banking. More broadly, Arthur Wilmarth questioned whether those scandals and the "stock market bubble" of the late-1990s were linked to the growing role of commercial banks in the securities markets during the 1990s. As Wilmarth's article indicated, the identified bank or bank affiliate activities linked to the Enron and World Com corporate scandals began in 1996 (or earlier) and most occurred before March 11, 2000, when bank holding companies could first use the new securities powers the GLBA provided to "financial holding companies".

In the 1990s, investment banks complained that commercial banking firms with Section 20 affiliates had coerced customers into hiring the Section 20 affiliate to underwrite securities in order to receive loans from the affiliated bank, which would have violated the "anti-tying" provisions of the Bank Holding Company Act. In 1997, the GAO issued a report reviewing those claims. After the GLBA became law, investment banks continued to claim such illegal "tying" was being practiced. In 2003, the GAO issued another report reviewing those claims.

Partly because of the "tying" issue many commentators expected investment banking firms would need to convert into bank holding companies (and qualify as financial holding companies) to compete with commercial bank affiliated securities firms. No major investment bank, however, became a bank holding company until the 2008 financial crisis. Then, all five major "free standing" investment banks (i.e., those not part of a bank holding company) either entered bankruptcy proceedings (Lehman Brothers), were acquired by bank holding companies (Bear Stearns by JP Morgan Chase and Merrill Lynch by Bank of America), or became bank holding companies by converting their industrial loan companies ("nonbank banks") into a national (Morgan Stanley) or state chartered Federal Reserve member bank (Goldman Sachs).

At the July 13, 2004, Senate Banking Committee hearing on the GLBA's effects, the Securities Industry Association representative explained securities firms had not taken advantage of the GLBA's "financial holding company" powers because that would have required them to end affiliations with commercial firms by 2009. GLBA critics had complained that the law had prevented insurance and securities firms from truly entering the banking business by making a "faulty" distinction between commercial and financial activities.

The Consumer Federation of America and other commentators suggested securities firms had avoided becoming "financial holding companies" because they wanted to avoid Federal Reserve supervision as bank holding companies. The SEC (through its Chairman Arthur Levitt) had supported efforts to permit securities firms to engage in non-FDIC insured banking activities without the Federal Reserve's "intrusive banking-style oversight" of the "overall holding company". After the GLBA became law, securities firms continued (and expanded) their deposit and lending activities through the "unitary thrifts" and "nonbank banks" (particularly industrial loan companies) they had used before the GLBA to avoid regulation as bank holding companies. Alan Greenspan later noted securities firms only took on the "embrace" of Federal Reserve Board supervision as bank holding companies (and financial holding companies) during the 2008 financial crisis.

Melanie Fein has described how the consolidation of the banking and securities industries occurred in the 1990s, particularly after the Federal Reserve Board's actions in 1996 and 1997 increasing Section 20 "bank-ineligible" revenue limits and removing "firewalls". Fein stated that "[a]lthough the Gramm-Leach-Blily Act was expected to trigger a cascade of new consolidation proposals, no major mergers of banks and securities firms occurred in the years immediately following" and that the "consolidation trend resumed abruptly in 2008 as a result of the financial crisis" leading to all the large investment banks being acquired by, or converting into, bank holding companies. Fein noted the lack of consolidation activity after 1999 and before September 2008 was "perhaps because much of the consolidation had occurred prior to the Act."

Commentators cite only three major financial firms from outside the banking industry (the discount broker Charles Schwab, the insurance company MetLife, and the mutual fund company Franklin Resources) for qualifying as financial holding companies after the GLBA became effective and before the 2008 financial crisis.

In 2011, the European Central Bank published a working paper that concluded commercial bank Section 20 affiliate underwriting of corporate bonds in the 1990s had been of lower quality than the underwriting of non-commercial bank affiliated securities firms. The authors suggest the most likely explanation was that commercial bank affiliates "had to be initially more aggressive than investment bank houses in order to gain market share, and in pursuing this objective they might have loosened their credit standards excessively." The working paper only examined corporate bonds underwritten from 1991 through 1999, a period before the GLBA permitted financial holding companies.

== Glass–Steagall "repeal" and the 2008 financial crisis ==
Robert Kuttner, Joseph Stiglitz, Elizabeth Warren, Robert Weissman, Richard D. Wolff and others have tied Glass–Steagall repeal to the 2008 financial crisis. Kuttner acknowledged "de facto inroads" before Glass–Steagall "repeal" but argued the GLBA's "repeal" had permitted "super-banks" to "re-enact the same kinds of structural conflicts of interest that were endemic in the 1920s," which he characterized as "lending to speculators, packaging and securitizing credits and then selling them off, wholesale or retail, and extracting fees at every step along the way." Stiglitz argued "the most important consequence of Glass–Steagall repeal" was in changing the culture of commercial banking so that the "bigger risk" culture of investment banking "came out on top." He also argued the GLBA "created ever larger banks that were too big to be allowed to fail," which "provided incentives for excessive risk taking." Warren explained Glass–Steagall had kept banks from doing "crazy things". She credited FDIC insurance, the Glass–Steagall separation of investment banking, and SEC regulations as providing "50 years without a crisis" and argued that crises returned in the 1980s with the "pulling away of the threads" of regulation. Weissman agrees with Stiglitz that the "most important effect" of Glass–Steagall "repeal" was to "change the culture of commercial banking to emulate Wall Street's high-risk speculative betting approach."

Lawrence J. White and Jerry Markham rejected these claims and argued that products linked to the 2008 financial crisis were not regulated by Glass–Steagall or were available from commercial banks or their affiliates before the GLBA repealed Glass–Steagall sections 20 and 32. Alan Blinder wrote in 2009 that he had "yet to hear a good answer" to the question "what bad practices would have been prevented if Glass–Steagall was still on the books?" Blinder argued that "disgraceful" mortgage underwriting standards "did not rely on any new GLB powers", that "free-standing investment banks" not the "banking-securities conglomerates" permitted by the GLBA were the major producers of "dodgy MBS", and that he could not "see how this crisis would have been any milder if GLB had never passed." Similarly, Melanie Fein wrote that the 2008 financial crisis "was not a result of the GLBA" and that the "GLBA did not authorize any securities activities that were the cause of the financial crisis." Fein noted "[s]ecuritization was not an activity authorized by the GLBA but instead had been held by the courts in 1990 to be part of the business of banking rather than an activity proscribed by the Glass–Steagall Act." As described above, in 1978 the OCC approved a national bank securitizing residential mortgages.

Carl Felsenfeld and David L. Glass wrote that "[t]he public—which for this purpose includes most of the members of Congress" does not understand that the investment banks and other "shadow banking" firms that experienced "runs" precipitating the 2008 financial crisis (i.e., AIG, Bear Stearns, Lehman Brothers, and Merrill Lynch) never became "financial holding companies" under the GLBA and, therefore, never exercised any new powers available through Glass–Steagall "repeal". They joined Jonathan R. Macey and Peter J. Wallison in noting many GLBA critics do not understand that Glass–Steagall's restrictions on banks (i.e., Sections 16 and 21) remained in effect and that the GLBA only repealed the affiliation provisions in Sections 20 and 32. The American Bankers Association, former President Bill Clinton, and others have argued that the GLBA permission for affiliations between securities and commercial banking firms "helped to mitigate" or "softened" the 2008 financial crisis by permitting bank holding companies to acquire troubled securities firms or such troubled firms to convert into bank holding companies.

Martin Mayer argued there were "three reasonable arguments" for tying Glass–Steagall repeal to the 2008 financial crisis: (1) it invited banks to enter risks they did not understand; (2) it created "network integration" that increased contagion; and (3) it joined the incompatible businesses of commercial and investment banking. Mayer, however, then described banking developments in the 1970s and 1980s that had already established these conditions before the GLBA repealed Sections 20 and 32. Mayer's 1974 book The Bankers detailed the "revolution in banking" that followed Citibank establishing a liquid secondary market in "negotiable certificates of deposit" in 1961. This new "liability management" permitted banks to fund their activities through the "capital markets", like nonbank lenders in the "shadow banking market", rather than through the traditional regulated bank deposit market envisioned by the 1933 Banking Act. In 1973 Sherman J. Maisel wrote of his time on the Federal Reserve Board and described how "[t]he banking system today is far different from what it was even in 1960" as "formerly little used instruments" were used in the "money markets" and "turned out to be extremely volatile."

In describing the "transformation of the U.S. financial services industry" from 1975 to 2000 (i.e., from after the "revolution in banking" described by Mayer in 1974 to the effective date of the GLBA), Arthur Wilmarth described how during the 1990s, despite remaining bank holding companies, J.P. Morgan & Co. and Bankers Trust "built financial profiles similar to securities firms with a heavy emphasis on trading and investments." In 1993, Helen Garten described the transformation of the same companies into "wholesale banks" similar to European "universal banks".

Jan Kregel agrees that "multifunction" banks are a source for financial crises, but he argues the "basic principles" of Glass–Steagall "were eviscerated even before" the GLBA. Kregel describes Glass–Steagall as creating a "monopoly that was doomed to fail" because after World War II nonbanks were permitted to use "capital market activities" to duplicate more cheaply the deposit and commercial loan products for which Glass–Steagall had sought to provide a bank monopoly.

While accepting that under Glass–Steagall financial firms could still have "made, sold, and securitized risky mortgages, all the while fueling a massive housing bubble and building a highly leveraged, Ponzi-like pyramid of derivatives on top," the New Rules Project concludes that commentators who deny the GLBA played a role in the 2008 financial crisis "fail to recognize the significance of 1999 as the pivotal policy-making moment leading up to the crash." The Project argues 1999 was Congress's opportunity to reject 25 years of "deregulation" and "confront the changing financial system by reaffirming the importance of effective structural safeguards, such as the Glass–Steagall Act's firewall and market share caps to limit the size of banks; bringing shadow banks into the regulatory framework; and developing new rules to control the dangers inherent in derivatives and other engineered financial products."

Raj Date and Michael Konczal similarly argued that the GLBA did not create the 2008 financial crisis but that the implicit "logical premises" of the GLBA, which included a belief that "non-depository 'shadow banks' should continue to compete in the banking business," "enabled the financial crisis" and "may well have hastened it."
