= Volcker Rule =

American investment banking rule

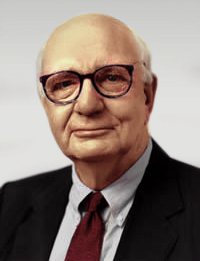
Paul Volcker

The Volcker Rule is section 619 of the Dodd–Frank Wall Street Reform and Consumer Protection Act (12 U.S.C. § 1851). The rule was originally proposed by American economist and former United States Federal Reserve chair Paul Volcker in 2010 to restrict United States banks from making certain kinds of speculative investments that do not benefit their customers. It was not implemented until July 2015. Volcker argued that such speculative activity played a key role in the 2008 financial crisis. The rule is often referred to as a ban on proprietary trading by commercial banks, whereby deposits are used to trade on the bank's own accounts, although a number of exceptions to this ban were included in the Dodd–Frank law.

The rule's provisions were scheduled to be implemented as part of the Dodd–Frank Act on July 21, 2010, with preceding ramifications, but were delayed. On December 10, 2013, the necessary agencies approved regulations implementing the rule, which were scheduled to go into effect April 1, 2014.

On January 14, 2014, after a lawsuit by community banks over provisions concerning specialized securities, revised final regulations were adopted. The rule came into effect on July 21, 2015. On August 11, 2016, several large banks requested a 5-year delay to exit illiquid investments.

On January 30, 2020, the Federal Reserve proposed rolling back some provisions of the rule, specifically rules that limit bank investment in venture capital and securitized loans. These changes were adopted on June 25, 2020.

== Background ==
Volcker was appointed by President Barack Obama as the chair of the President's Economic Recovery Advisory Board on February 6, 2009. President Obama created the board to advise his Administration on economic recovery matters. Volcker argued vigorously that since a functioning commercial banking system is essential to the stability of the financial system, banks high-risk speculation created an unacceptable level of systemic risk. He also argued that the vast increase in derivative use, designed to mitigate systemic risk, had produced exactly the opposite effect.

== Entry into legislation ==
The Volcker Rule was first publicly endorsed by President Obama on January 21, 2010. The proposal was to specifically prohibit a bank or institution that owns a bank from engaging in proprietary trading, and from owning or investing in a hedge fund or private equity fund, and also to limit the liabilities that the largest banks could hold. Also under discussion was the possibility of placing restrictions on the way market-making activities are compensated; traders would be paid on the basis of the spread of transactions rather than any profit that the trader made for the client.

On January 21, 2010, under the same initiative, President Obama announced his intention to end the mentality of "Too big to fail".

In a February 22, 2010 letter to The Wall Street Journal, five former secretaries of the treasury endorsed the Volcker Rule proposals. As of February 23, 2010, the U.S. Congress began to consider a weaker bill allowing federal regulators to restrict proprietary trading and hedge fund ownership by banks, but not prohibiting these activities altogether.

Senators Jeff Merkley, Democrat of Oregon, and Carl Levin, Democrat of Michigan, introduced the main piece of the Volcker Rule – its limitations on proprietary trading – as an amendment to the broader Dodd–Frank financial reform legislation that was passed by the United States Senate on May 20, 2010. Despite having wide support in the Senate, the amendment was never given a vote. When the Merkley-Levin Amendment was first brought to the floor, Senator Richard Shelby, Republican of Alabama, objected to a motion to vote on the amendment. Merkley and Levin responded by attaching the amendment to another amendment to the bill put forth by Senator Sam Brownback, Republican of Kansas. Shortly before it was due to be voted upon, Brownback withdrew his own amendment, thus killing the Merkley-Levin amendment and the Volcker Rule as part of the Senate bill.

Despite that vote, the proposal made it into the final legislation when the House–Senate conference committee passed a strengthened version of the rule that included the language prepared by Senators Merkley and Levin. The original Merkley-Levin amendment and the final legislation both covered more types of proprietary trading than the original rule proposed by the administration. It also banned conflict of interest trading. Senator Levin commented on the importance of that aspect:

We are also pleased that the conference report includes strong language to prevent the obscene conflicts of interest revealed in the Permanent Subcommittee on Investigations hearing with Goldman Sachs. This is an important victory for fairness for investors such as pension funds and for the integrity of the financial system. As the Goldman Sachs investigation showed, business as usual on Wall Street has for too long allowed banks to create instruments which are based on junky assets, then sell them to clients, and bet against their own clients by betting on their failure. The measure approved by the conferees ends that type of conflict which Wall Street has engaged in.

Conferees changed the proprietary trading ban to allow banks to invest in hedge funds and private equity funds at the request of Senator Scott Brown (R-Mass.), whose vote was needed in the Senate to pass the bill. The Volcker rule was further amended to allow banks to invest 3% of Tier 1 capital into hedge funds and private equity funds, an amount that would exceed $6 billion a year for Bank of America alone. Proprietary trading in Treasuries, bonds issued by government-backed entities like Fannie Mae and Freddie Mac, as well as municipal bonds were also exempted. Another form of permitted proprietary trading allows market making trading based on Reasonably Expected Near Term Demand of Customers ("RENTD"). Trading desks that will use the underwriting exception must also estimate RENTD, which is defined differently for underwriting.

Following the passage of the Financial Reform Bill, many banks and financial firms indicated that they did not expect the Volcker Rule to have a significant effect on their profits.

== Implementation ==
Public comments to the Financial Stability Oversight Council on how exactly the rule should be implemented were submitted through November 5, 2010. Financial firms such as Goldman Sachs, Bank of America, and JPMorgan Chase & Co. posted comments expressing concerns about the rule. Republican representatives to Congress also expressed concern about the Volcker Rule, saying the rule's prohibitions may hamper the competitiveness of American banks in the global marketplace, and that they may seek to cut funding to the federal agencies responsible for its enforcement. The Chairman of the House Financial Services Committee, Representative Spencer Bachus (R-Alabama), stated that he was seeking to limit the effect of the Volcker Rule, although Volcker himself stated that he expected backers of the rule to prevail over such critics.

Regulators presented a proposed form of the Volcker Rule regulations for public comment on October 11, 2011, which was approved by the SEC, The Federal Reserve, The Office of the Comptroller of the Currency and the FDIC. The proposed regulations were immediately criticized by banking groups as being too costly to implement, and by reform advocates for being weak and filled with loopholes. On January 12, 2012, the U.S. Commodity Futures Trading Commission (CFTC) issued substantially similar proposed regulations.

Volcker himself stated that he would have preferred a simpler set of rules: "I'd write a much simpler bill. I'd love to see a four-page bill that bans proprietary trading and makes the board and chief executive responsible for compliance. And I'd have strong regulators. If the banks didn't comply with the spirit of the bill, they'd go after them."

Regulators gave the public until February 13, 2012, to comment on the proposed draft of the regulations (over 17,000 comments were made). Under the Dodd–Frank financial reform law, the regulations went into effect on July 21, 2012. However, during his report to Congress on February 29, 2012, Federal Reserve Chairman Ben S. Bernanke said the central bank and other regulators would not meet that deadline.

By February 26, 2013, the rule was still not implemented. Occupy the SEC filed a suit in the Eastern District Court of New York naming the Federal Reserve, the SEC, CFTC, OCC, FDIC, and the U.S. Department of the Treasury and calling for the court to set a deadline for implementation. Subsequently, it was reported that the Volcker Rule was not likely to be in effect until July 2014 and that some industry lobbyists were pushing for extension beyond that date.

On December 10, 2013, the Volcker Rule regulations were approved by all five of the necessary financial regulatory agencies. It was set to go into effect April 1, 2014. The final rule had a longer compliance period and fewer metrics than earlier proposals. Furthermore, the final rule put the onus on banks to demonstrate that they are operating their trading activities in compliance with the rule and required CEO certification of the effectiveness of the compliance program.

However, after a lawsuit was filed to stay the effect of the Volcker Rule regulations over whether banks could be required to sell or divest collateralized debt obligations (CDOs) backed by trust-preferred securities (TruPS), on December 27, 2013, the Federal Reserve Board, FDIC, OCC, CFTC and SEC all announced they were reviewing whether it would be appropriate to exempt a small subset of securities from the rule, on which they would rule by January 15, 2014, at the latest. On January 14, 2014, interim final regulations were adopted to permit certain banking entities to retain those investments.

On January 14, 2014, revised final regulations were approved, and the rule came into effect on July 21, 2015.

Extensions continued for banks to exit illiquid investments. On December 18, 2014, the Federal Reserve extended the Volcker Rule's conformance period for "legacy covered funds" (a defined term) until July 21, 2016, and indicated it would likely extend the period further to July 21, 2017. The extension to 2016 is the second of three possible one-year extensions the Federal Reserve may issue under the Dodd–Frank Act (regulators provided an initial one-year extension when the Volcker Rule was finalized in December 2013). Wall Street lobbyists continued to ask the Federal Reserve to extend the deadline for some banking investments in private equity and hedge funds.

== Relaxation, 2020-present ==
On January 30, 2020, the Volcker Regulators put forward a proposal to shrink the "covered funds" for which banks face investment limitations, allowing banks to invest in venture capital and securitized loans. Specifically, banks would be allowed to acquire or retain ownership interests in venture capital funds, or pools of investment for small businesses and start-ups. Under the existing rule, banks could make indirect investments into venture capital funds but faced restrictions on directly owning a fund. The rule change would also give banks more leeway to invest or sponsor credit funds that make loans, invest in debt securities, or extend credit. One implication of this rule change would be greater bank activity in the market for collateralized loan obligations (CLOs), where banks were previously barred from involving themselves with CLO funds that included a debt component. Federal Reserve Chairman Jerome Powell called the proposed change "a simpler, clearer approach to implementing the rule [which] makes it easier for both banks and regulators to carry out the intent of the rule". Federal Reserve Governor Lael Brainard voted against the proposal, arguing that "several of the proposed changes will weaken core protections in the Volcker rule and enable banking firms again to engage in high-risk activities related to covered funds"

On June 25, 2020, the Volcker Regulators relaxed part of the rules involving banks investing in venture capital and derivative trading.

== Ongoing regulatory debate in the US and the European Union ==
European scholars and lawmakers also discussed the necessity of banking reform in light of the crisis, recommending the adoption of specific regulations limiting proprietary trading by banks and their affiliates, notably in France where SFAF and World Pensions Council banking experts argued that, beyond fragmented national legislations, such rules should be adopted and implemented within the broader context of statutory laws valid across the European Union.

The Liikanen Report, or "Report of the European Commission's High-level Expert Group on Bank Structural Reform", is a set of recommendations published in October 2012 by a group of experts led by Erkki Liikanen, governor of the Bank of Finland and ECB council member. The "Liikanen Group" was molded after the UK's Independent Commission on Banking and the President's Council on Jobs and Competitiveness: it was established in Brussels by EU Commissioner Michel Barnier in February 2012.

On July 25, 2012, former Citigroup Chairman and CEO Sandy Weill, considered one of the driving forces behind the considerable financial deregulation and "mega-mergers" of the 1990s, surprised financial analysts in Europe and North America by "calling for splitting up the commercial banks from the investment banks. He called for the return of the Glass-Steagall Act of 1933, which he said had effectively led to half a century free of financial crises.

On October 24, 2017, citing "no foreseeable agreement" in sight on criteria, the European Commission scrapped the draft legislation that would have permitted the EBA regulator to order "too big to fail" banks to split off their trading activities. The draft was supposed to be the EU's answer to the United States' Volcker Rule.

== Effects ==
The proposal of the Volcker Rule led to an exodus of top proprietary traders from large banks to form their own hedge funds or join existing hedge funds including Todd Edgar and Roger Jones from Barclays, Sutesh Sharma from Citigroup, George "Beau" Taylor and Trevor Woods from Credit Suisse, Pablo Calderini, Nelson Saiers and Boaz Weinstein from Deutsche Bank, Pierre-Henri Flamand, Bob Howard, Morgan Sze, Darren Wong and Mathew McClean from Goldman Sachs, Deepak Gulati and Mike Stewart from JP Morgan, Peter Muller from Morgan Stanley, and Jean Bourlet from UBS.

Critics of the rule pointed to the subsequent brain drain of top talent. However the trading expertise thus lost would only relate to the activity to be curtailed by the new framework, and would only be lost to the banks rather than the economy as a whole, and may be understood as precisely the sort of cultural change within taxpayer-supported banks that the rule was intended to achieve.

== Historical antecedents ==
The Volcker Rule has been compared to, and contrasted with, the Glass–Steagall Act of 1933. Its core differences from the Glass–Steagall Act have been cited by one scholar as being at the center of the rule's identified weaknesses.

== See also ==
- 2008–2010 bank failures in the United States
- 2008–09 Keynesian resurgence
- Brown–Kaufman amendment
- Principal–agent problem
