= Glass–Steagall Act of 1932 =

Law passed by the United States Congress

- Other short titles: Banking Act of 1932
- Long title: An Act To amend the Federal Reserve Act, and for other purposes
- Enacted by: the 72nd United States Congress

Citations
- Public law: Pub. L. 72–44
- Statutes at Large: 47 Stat. 56

Codification
- Acts amended: Federal Reserve Act
- Titles amended: 12

Legislative history
- Introduced in the House as H.R. 9203 by Henry B. Steagall; Committee consideration by House Banking and Currency; Passed the House on; Passed the Senate on; Signed into law by President Herbert Hoover on February 27, 1932

Major amendments
- Banking Act of 1933

The first "Glass–Steagall Act" was a law passed by the United States Congress on February 27, 1932, prior to the inclusion of more comprehensive measures in the Banking Act of 1933, which is now more commonly known as the Glass–Steagall Act. It was the first time that currency (non-specie, paper currency, etc.) was permitted to be allocated for the Federal Reserve System. It was passed in an effort to stop deflation and expanded the Federal Reserve's ability to offer loans to member banks (rediscounts) on more types of assets such as government bonds as well as commercial paper.

"Glass–Steagall Act" is not the official title of the law; it is a colloquialism that refers to its legislative sponsors, Carter Glass, a US Senator from Virginia and Henry B. Steagall, the Congressman from Alabama's 3rd congressional district. The official title was "An Act to Improve the Facilities of the Federal Reserve System for the Service of Commerce, Industry, & Agriculture, to Provide Means for Meeting the Needs of Member Banks in Exceptional Circumstances, & for Other Purposes".

== Contents ==
The Glass–Steagall Act of 1932 authorized Federal Reserve Banks to (1) lend to five or more Federal Reserve System member banks on a group basis or to any individual member bank with capital stock of $5 million or less against any satisfactory collateral, not only "eligible paper", and (2) issue Federal Reserve Bank Notes (i.e., paper currency) backed by US government securities when a shortage of "eligible paper" held by Federal Reserve banks would have required such currency to be backed by gold. The Federal Reserve Board explained that the special lending to Federal Reserve member banks permitted by the 1932 Glass–Steagall Act would only be permitted in "unusual and temporary circumstances".

== Historical context ==
The crash of 1929 evolved into a panic situation due to people losing their savings. Therefore, a massive withdrawal of deposits of the banks took place leading to the bankruptcy of many entities. In 1933, a young prosecutor named Ferdinand Pecora, who was a member of the US Senate's Monetary and Financial Affairs Commission, interrogated several bank managers about their detestable role in the crisis. These hearings and the coming to power of Franklin D. Roosevelt and his New Deal policy gave rise to the law.

== See also ==
- US corporate law
- US banking law
