= Analyse Financière =

European financial research publication

Founded in Paris in 1971, Analyse Financière also known as Revue Analyse Financière is one of Europe’s longest running financial research quarterlies, with contributions from leading academics and financial industry professionals as well as policy makers and national and international regulators.

== Collaboration ==
The Revue is published by the French Society of Financial Analysts (SFAF), France's National Association of Financial Analysts that brings together investment banking, private equity and asset management experts and researchers focusing on securities valuation, capital markets and financial economics.
