= Independent Commission on Banking =

The Independent Commission on Banking was a United Kingdom government inquiry looking at structural and related non-structural reforms to the UK banking sector to promote financial stability and competition in the wake of the 2008 financial crisis. It was established in June 2010 and produced its final report and recommendations in September 2011.

== Composition ==
It was chaired by John Vickers and included four other commissioners; Bill Winters, Martin Taylor, Clare Spottiswoode and Martin Wolf. The commissioners were supported by a Secretariat of fourteen officials seconded from HM Treasury, the Department for Business, Innovation and Skills, the Financial Services Authority, the Bank of England and the Office of Fair Trading. The secretariat was headed by Sam Woods.

== Recommendations ==
The commission made its recommendations to the UK government on 12 September 2011. Its headline recommendation was that British banks should 'ring-fence' their retail banking divisions from their investment banking arms to safeguard against riskier banking activities, but it also made a number of other recommendations on bank capital requirements and competition in retail banking. The government announced the same day that it would introduce legislation into Parliament aimed at implementing the recommendations.

The text of the final report and recommendations is available from the UK National Archives.

== Influence on banking regulation in France and the European Union ==
Mainland European scholars had recommended the adoption of similar 'ring-fencing' regulations, notably in France where SFAF and World Pensions Council (WPC) banking experts argued that such rules should be adopted in European Union law. - and the Liikanen report in October 2012 on Bank Structural Reform had as its key recommendation a “ringfence” separating trading from deposits.

== See also ==
- Bank regulation
- Glass–Steagall Legislation
