= Jane D'Arista =

American economist

Jane D'Arista (1934-2026) was an American economist and research associate at the Economic Policy Institute and co-coordinator of its Committee of Economists and Analysts for Financial Reform.

She wrote on the history of U.S. monetary policy and financial regulation, international and domestic monetary systems, and capital flows to emerging economies. She served for 20 years as a staff economist for the U.S. Congress, and then, from 1988 to 1999, she taught international finance at Boston University School of Law. She authored The Evolution of U.S. Finance (2009). She died in 2026 at the age of 94.

== Early life and education ==
D'Arista studied at Barnard College.

== Bibliography ==
- Jane W. D'Arista (1994). The Evolution of U.S. Finance: Federal Reserve Monetary Policy, 1915-1935. Vol. One. M.E. Sharpe. ISBN 978-1-56324-230-4.
- Jane W. D'Arista (1994). The Evolution of U.S. Finance: Federal Reserve Monetary Policy, 1915-1935. Vol. Two. M.E. Sharpe. ISBN 978-1-56324-232-8.
