= Lawrence J. White =

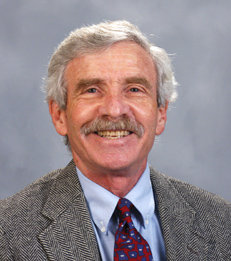
- Lawrence J. White
- Born: c. 1943

Academic background
- Education: Harvard University, London School of Economics

Lawrence J. White (born c. 1943) is Robert Kavesh Professor of Economics at New York University's Leonard N. Stern School of Business. During 1986–1989 he was on leave to serve as board member, Federal Home Loan Bank Board, in which capacity he also served as board member for Freddie Mac; and during 1982–1983 he was on leave to serve as Director of the Economic Policy Office, Antitrust Division, US Department of Justice. He is the General Editor of The Review of Industrial Organization and formerly Secretary-Treasurer of the Western Economic Association International.

== Biography ==
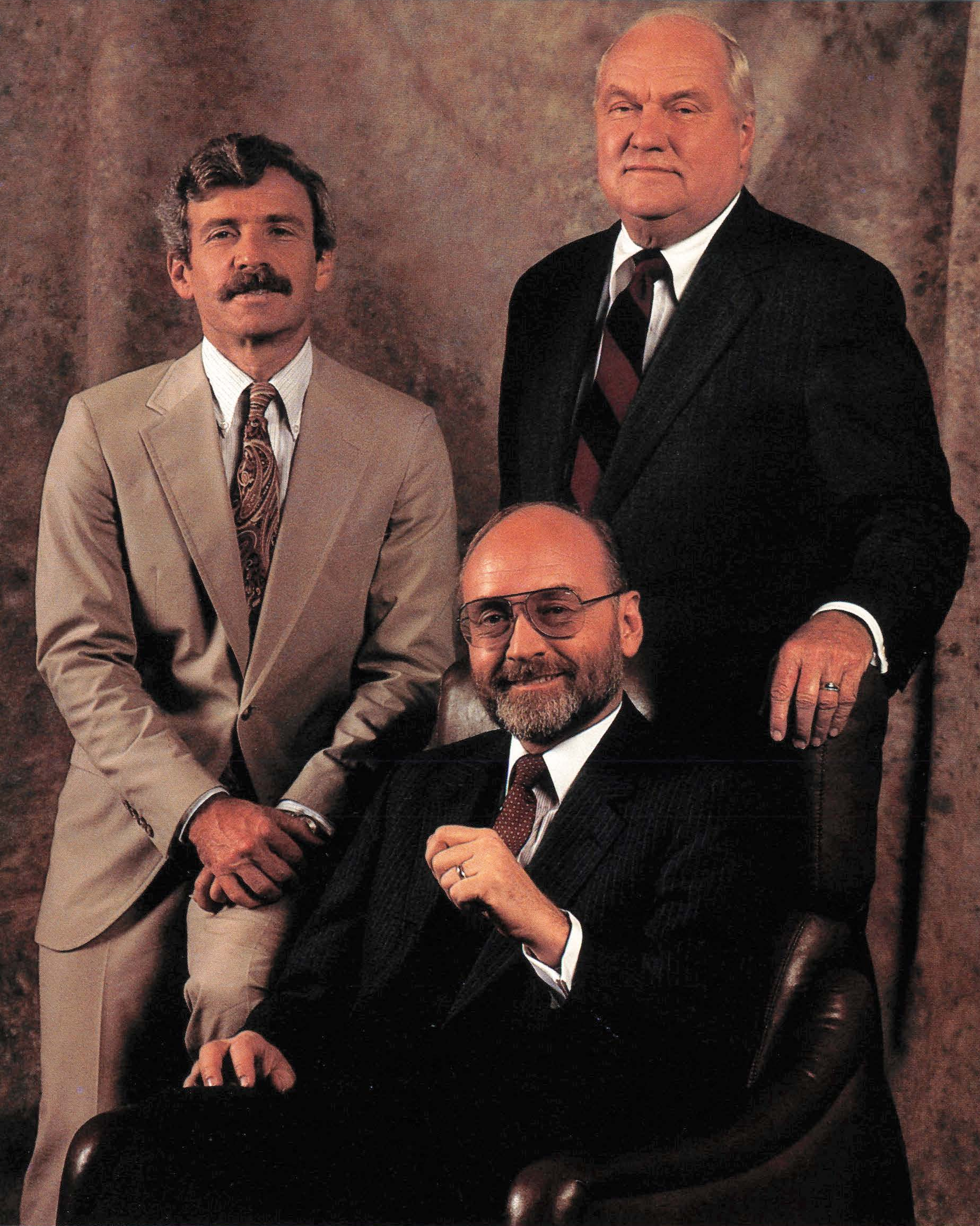
White, on left, during his tenure as a member of the Federal Home Loan Bank Board, depicted in the Board's 1987 annual report

White received the B.A. from Harvard University (1964), the M.Sc. from the London School of Economics (1965), and the Ph.D. from Harvard University (1969). He has written articles in leading economics, finance, and law journals.

He was the North American Editor of The Journal of Industrial Economics, 1984–1987 and 1990–1995. White served on the Senior Staff of the President's Council of Economic Advisers during 1978–1979, and he was Chairman of the Stern School's Department of Economics, 1990–1995.

== Selected publications ==
- The Automobile Industry Since 1945 (1971)
- Industrial Concentration and Economic Power in Pakistan (1974)
- Reforming Regulation: Processes and Problems (1981)
- The Regulation of Air Pollutant Emissions from Motor Vehicles (1982)
- The Public Library in the 1980s: The Problems of Choice (1983)
- International Trade in Ocean Shipping Services: The U.S. and the World (1988)
- The S&L Debacle: Public Policy Lessons for Bank and Thrift Regulation (1991)
- Guaranteed to Fail: Fannie Mae, Freddie Mac, and the Debacle of Mortgage Finance, Princeton University Press, 2011 (with V.V. Acharya, M. Richardson, and S. Van Nieuwerburgh)

He is editor or coeditor of twelve volumes:

- Deregulation of the Banking and Securities Industries (1979)
- Mergers and Acquisitions: Current Problems in Perspective (1982)
- Technology and the Regulation of Financial Markets: Securities, Futures, and Banking (1986)
- Private Antitrust Litigation: New Evidence, New Learning (1988)
- The Antitrust Revolution (1989)
- Bank Management and Regulation (1992)
- Structural Change in Banking (1993)
- The Antitrust Revolution: The Role of Economics, 2nd edn. (1994)
- The Antitrust Revolution: Economics, Competition, and Policy, 3rd edn. (1999)
- The Antitrust Revolution: Economics, Competition, and Policy, 4th edn. (2004)
- The Antitrust Revolution: Economics, Competition, and Policy, 5th edn. (2009)
- The Antitrust Revolution: Economics, Competition, and Policy, 6th edn. (2014)
