= Liikanen report =

The Liikanen Report or "Report of the European Commission’s High-level Expert Group on Bank Structural Reform" (known as the "Liikanen Group") is a set of recommendations published in October 2012 by a group of experts led by Erkki Liikanen, governor of the Bank of Finland and ECB council member. On 3 July 2013, by large majority the European Parliament adopted an own initiative report called "Reforming the structure of the EU banking sector" that welcomes structural reform measures at Union level to tackle concerns on Too big to fail banks, that led to the publication of a proposal of Regulation on structural measures improving the resilience of EU credit institutions in January 2014. This proposal was withdrawn in July 2018.

== Formation and objectives ==
The Liikanen Group was molded after the UK's Independent Commission on Banking: EU Internal Markets Commissioner Michel Barnier set up the group in November 2011 in the context of the European sovereign-debt crisis and great recession. Its mandate was to determine whether structural reforms of EU banks would strengthen financial stability, improve efficiency and consumer protection in addition to the regulatory reform of the EU bank sector. Regulatory reform had been ongoing since 2009 and culminated in the adoption of the European Banking Authority in October 2013.

== The Liikanen Group ==
According to the EU Commission, the 11 members of the ad hoc “Liikanen Group” were appointed solely on the basis of their technical expertise and professional merit. The group held monthly meetings, invited different stakeholders, and invited the public to comment on their draft in May 2012. It was composed of:

- Erkki Liikanen, chairman, Governor of the Bank of Finland and member of the ECB Governing Council (2004–present).
- Hugo Bänziger, Swiss economist and bank manager, visiting professor at the London School of Economics and the Lee Kwan Yew Institute for Public Policy, member of the board of Eurex, former board member and chief risk officer of Deutsche Bank (2006-5/2012), and former employee of global investment banks Morgan Grenfell and Credit Suisse after starting at the Swiss Federal Banking Commission.
- José Manuel Campa, Spanish economist, professor of financial management at IESE Business School at the University of Navarra, former State Secretary at the Spanish Ministry of Economy and Finance (2009-12/2011), and alumnus of Harvard University.
- Louis Gallois, alumnus of the HEC Paris School of Management, former chief executive of EADS, a Franco-German defense and aviation group, SNCF, France's national state-owned railway company, Aerospatiale and SNECMA, French multinational aircraft and rocket engine manufacturer, former senior member of the French Ministry of Economy and Finance, the French Ministry of Research and Industry and the French Ministry of Defense.
- Monique Goyens, director general of BEUC (2007–present), the EU consumers' rights organization representing 42 independent national consumer associations in 31 European countries.
- Jan Pieter Krahnen, German economist, chair of the corporate finance department at Goethe University in Frankfurt/Main, Germany (1995–present), and Director of the Center for Financial Studies, a non-profit research institution in Frankfurt/Main and Center for Economic and Policy Research(CEPR) research fellow in Financial Economics.
- Marco Mazzucchelli, Italian investment banker, alumnus of Bocconi University, visiting scholar at the MIT Sloan School of Management, former managing director of the Global Banking and Markets division of the Royal Bank of Scotland, Head of the region Europe, the Middle East and Africa (EMEA), positions at Credit Suisse, Monte dei Paschi di Siena, Sanpaolo IMI and Morgan Stanley among others.
- Carol Sergeant, chairwoman of the UK Treasury steering group charged with devising so called ‘simple’financial products that can easily be understood by retail consumers and forming financial markets experts at the Bank of England, non-executive director of Secure Trust Bank, chairman of the whistle blowing charity 'Public Concern at Work' and special adviser to bank chief executives and chairmen, former Chief Risk Officer of Lloyds Banking Group (2004-2010), Managing Director on the Board of the UK Financial Services Authority in charge of the regulatory process and risks directorate( ?-2004) after starting career at the Bank of England.
- Zdenek Tuma, Czech economist, director at KPMG, a global audit, tax and advisory company, former governor of the Czech National Bank(2000-2010), after various posts in academia and the private sector.
- Jan Vanhevel, retired Belgian banker, former Chief Executive Officer (7/2009-5/2012) of Belgian KBC banking and insurance group, where he advocated for social responsibility.
- Herman Wijffels, economist, part-time professor in Sustainability and Societal Change at Utrecht University (2009–present), former executive board member of Rabobank (1981-1999, chair 1986), Chairman of the Dutch Social Economic Council Sociaal-Economische Raad, (1999-2006) `informateur’, coordinating negotiations between the political parties for the cabinet-to-be in 2007, and former Dutch representative of the World Bank (2006-2009).

== Filling the regulatory gap ==
European scholars had discussed the need for an EU-wide banking law in light of the European sovereign-debt crisis. In France SFAF and World Pensions Council (WPC) banking experts have argued that, beyond fragmented national legislations, statutory rules should be adopted and implemented within the broader context of separation of powers in European Union law.

This perspective gained ground after the Libor scandal broke news in June 2012, with mainstream opinion leaders such as Financial Times editorial writers in the UK and the Centre des Jeunes Dirigeants (CJD), a Business Federation in France calling as in 2008, for adoption of an EU-wide "Glass Steagall II". Likewise, former Citigroup Chairman and CEO Sandy Weill, considered one of the driving forces behind the financial deregulation and “mega-mergers” of the 1990s, surprised financial analysts in Europe and North American July 25, 2012, by “calling for splitting up the commercial banks from the investment banks. In effect, he says: "bring back the Glass-Steagall Act of 1933 which led to half a century, free of financial crises.”

== Final report ==
The 153 page final version of the report was published October 2, 2012. The recommendations combined key features of the Dodd–Frank Wall Street Reform and Consumer Protection Act and the UK’s 2011 "Vickers Report" by the Independent Commission on Banking.

The report recommended actions in the following 5 areas:

1. Mandatory separation of proprietary trading and other high-risk trading;
2. Additional separation of activities, conditional on the recovery and resolution plan (RRP);
3. Amendments to the use of bail-in instruments as a resolution tool;
4. Toughening of capital requirements on trading assets and real estate related loans (i.e. mortgages), aka fractional reserve banking;
5. Strengthening bank governance and control of banks, including measures to rein in or bail-in bonuses.

The report gives an overview of the structure and evolution of the EU banking sector with its tradition of universal banking, and assesses banking reforms in the European post-debt crisis era. It lists a range of proposals to remedy deficits in bank reforms, such as improving of already existing regulations in risk management under the Basel III rules, corporate governance, bank resolution mechanisms, management and strengthening of supervision and compensation rules for bank staff. It advocates for a better alignment of executive pay with long term corporate and national interests, by raising the fixed income or “debt” component of bankers’ bonuses, meaning the bonuses could be decreased if short-term profits yield long-term troubles, paying bonuses with bonds. The Swiss bank UBS adopted the latter so called "bail-in bonds". 2/5/13.

Re 1) Mandatory separation of high-risk trading activities i.e. compartmentalization, or “ring-fencing” of proprietary and third-party trading activities, without breaking banks up is to include risk management and capital allocation: “the trading division will have to hold its own capital, meaning that it stands or falls by its own activities and cannot, in theory at least, knock over the bread-and-butter retail banking operations." Universal banks with very large trading arms either in absolute terms (over €100bn-£80bn-$130bn-¥10.2tr-Y821bn) or in proportion to the rest of the bank (greater than 15%-25%) should be forced to hold separate capital for its trading operations.

Re 2)-5) Mechanisms to allow a bank to enter bankruptcy instead of the public having to rescue it: "The idea is to get taxpayers off the hook by ensuring that governments do not have to step in to safeguard deposits if traders blow a hole in their balance sheet".

During a 6-week public comment period, closed on 11/13/2012, 89 responses mainly by financial organizations were received, summarized on 6 pages

On 17 May 2013, the Liikanen report's conclusion was its public discussion in a European Commission meeting on Bank Structural Reform. The main points are concisely summarized on 4 pages.

== Reception by the financial industry ==
- Christian Clausen, president of the European Banking Federation, head of the Swedish bank Nordea, called the proposal “unnecessary” and “completely wrong.”
- The German bank lobby, the Bundesverband deutscher Banken claimed, proposals amounted to "overregulation, would ruin Germany’s reputation as a location for finance and thus could damage the German economy" in the BdB press statement 10/2/12
- The World Savings Banks Institute's European Savings Banks Group called the report "Excess of financial regulation" in its 9-page response from 11/2012.

== Media Coverage ==
- "The Liikanen report decoded" Financial Times, 10/2/2012.
- "The Liikanen banking reform proposals" OnlyStrategic. UK Financial Newslink. 10/5/12.
- "The Liikanen review. Into the ring. A European report recommends yet another way to ring-fence banks." The Economist, 10/6/2012.
- "Liikanen Report: Half-hearted attempt to solve the “too big to fail” problem." By Peter Wahl
- "Liikanen’s Bank-Separation Proposal Sparks Opposition, EU Says" Bloomberg News 12/20/12.
