= Decline of the Glass–Steagall Act =

Banking act that placed restrictions on investment firms

The Glass–Steagall Act was a part of the 1933 Banking Act. It placed restrictions on activities that commercial banks and investment banks (or other securities firms) could do. It effectively separated those activities, so the two types of business could not mix, in order to protect consumer's money from speculative use. The Banking Act of 1935 clarified and otherwise amended Glass–Steagall.

Over time, private firms and their regulators found novel ways to weaken the barriers envisioned in the legislation. Eventually, the protections became very weak.

From its start, there were many economists, businessmen, and politicians who did not find the restrictions to be productive, and wished to do away with them altogether. It took about 66 years, but the legislation was eventually completely repealed. Subsequent financial crises have resulted in attempts to revive the legislation, and even make it stronger than originally envisioned.

== Glass–Steagall developments from 1935 to 1991 ==
Commercial banks withdrew from the depressed securities markets of the early 1930s even before the Glass–Steagall prohibitions on securities underwriting and dealing became effective. However, those prohibitions were controversial. A 1934 study of commercial bank affiliate underwriting of securities in the 1920s found such underwriting was not better than the underwriting by firms that were not affiliated with banks. That study disputed Glass–Steagall critics who suggested securities markets had been harmed by prohibiting commercial bank involvement. A 1942 study also found that commercial bank affiliate underwriting was not better (or worse) than nonbank affiliate underwriting, but concluded this meant it was a "myth" commercial bank securities affiliates had taken advantage of bank customers to sell "worthless securities."

=== Senator Glass's "repeal" effort ===
In 1935, Senator Glass attempted to repeal the Glass–Steagall prohibition on commercial banks underwriting corporate securities. Glass stated Glass–Steagall had unduly damaged securities markets by prohibiting commercial bank underwriting of corporate securities. The first Senate passed version of the Banking Act of 1935 included Glass's revision to Section 16 of the Glass–Steagall Act to permit bank underwriting of corporate securities subject to limitations and regulations.

President Roosevelt opposed this revision to Section 16 and wrote Glass that "the old abuses would come back if underwriting were restored in any shape, manner, or form." In the conference committee that reconciled differences between the House and Senate passed versions of the Banking Act of 1935, Glass's language amending Section 16 was removed.

=== Comptroller Saxon's Glass–Steagall interpretations ===
President John F. Kennedy's appointee as Comptroller of the Currency, James J. Saxon, was the next public official to seriously challenge Glass–Steagall's prohibitions. As the regulator of national banks, Saxon was concerned with the competitive position of commercial banks. In 1950 commercial banks held 52% of the assets of US financial institutions. By 1960 that share had declined to 38%. Saxon wanted to expand the powers of national banks.

In 1963, the Saxon-led Office of the Comptroller of the Currency (OCC) issued a regulation permitting national banks to offer retail customers "commingled accounts" holding common stocks and other securities. This amounted to permitting banks to offer mutual funds to retail customers. Saxon also issued rulings that national banks could underwrite municipal revenue bonds. Courts ruled that both of these actions violated Glass–Steagall.

In rejecting bank sales of accounts that functioned like mutual funds, the Supreme Court explained in Investment Company Institute v. Camp that it would have given "deference" to the OCC's judgment if the OCC had explained how such sales could avoid the conflicts of interest and other "subtle hazards" Glass–Steagall sought to prevent and that could arise when a bank offered a securities product to its retail customers. Courts later applied this aspect of the Camp ruling to uphold interpretations of Glass–Steagall by federal banking regulators. As in the Camp case, these interpretations by bank regulators were routinely challenged by the mutual fund industry through the Investment Company Institute or the securities industry through the Securities Industry Association as they sought to prevent competition from commercial banks.

=== 1966 to 1980 developments ===
==== Increasing competitive pressures for commercial banks ====
Regulation Q limits on interest rates for time deposits at commercial banks, authorized by the 1933 Banking Act, first became "effective" in 1966 when market interest rates exceeded those limits. This produced the first of several "credit crunches" during the late 1960s and throughout the 1970s as depositors withdrew funds from banks to reinvest at higher market interest rates. When this "disintermediation" limited the ability of banks to meet the borrowing requests of all their corporate customers, some commercial banks helped their "best customers" establish programs to borrow directly from the "capital markets" by issuing commercial paper. Over time, commercial banks were increasingly left with lower credit quality, or more speculative, corporate borrowers that could not borrow directly from the "capital markets."

Eventually, even lower credit quality corporations and (indirectly through "securitization") consumers were able to borrow from the capital markets as improvements in communication and information technology allowed investors to evaluate and invest in a broader range of borrowers. Banks began to finance residential mortgages through securitization in the late 1970s. During the 1980s banks and other lenders used securitizations to provide "capital markets" funding for a wide range of assets that previously had been financed by bank loans. In losing "their preeminent status as expert intermediaries for the collection, processing, and analysis of information relating to extensions of credit", banks were increasingly "bypassed" as traditional "depositors" invested in securities that replaced bank loans.

In 1977 Merrill Lynch introduced a "cash management account" that allowed brokerage customers to write checks on funds held in a money market account or drawn from a "line of credit" Merrill provided. The Securities and Exchange Commission (SEC) had ruled that money market funds could "redeem" investor shares at a $1 stable "net asset value" despite daily fluctuations in the value of the securities held by the funds. This allowed money market funds to develop into "near money" as "investors" wrote checks ("redemption orders") on these accounts much as "depositors" wrote checks on traditional checking accounts provided by commercial banks.

Also in the 1970s savings and loans, which were not restricted by Glass–Steagall other than Section 21, were permitted to offer "negotiable order of withdrawal accounts" (NOW accounts). As with money market accounts, these accounts functioned much like checking accounts in permitting a depositor to order payments from a "savings account."

Helen Garten concluded that the "traditional regulation" of commercial banks established by the 1933 Banking Act, including Glass–Steagall, failed when nonbanking firms and the "capital markets" were able to provide replacements for bank loans and deposits, thereby reducing the profitability of commercial banking. Richard Vietor agreed that traditional bank regulation was unable to protect commercial banks from nonbank competition. However, he noted that significant the economic and financial instability began in the mid-1960s. This slowed economic growth and savings, which reduced demand and supply of credit; it also induced financial innovations that undermined commercial banks.

Hyman Minsky agreed financial instability had returned in 1966 and had only been constrained in the following 15 years through Federal Reserve Board engineered "credit crunches" to combat inflation followed by "lender of last resort" rescues of asset prices that produced new inflation. Minsky described ever worsening periods of inflation followed by unemployment as the cycle of rescues followed by credit crunches was repeated. Minsky, however, supported traditional banking regulation and advocated further controls of finance to "promote smaller and simpler organizations weighted more toward direct financing." Writing from a similar "neo-Keynesian perspective," Jan Kregel concluded that, after World War II, non-regulated financial companies, supported by regulatory actions, developed means to provide bank products ("liquidity and lending accommodation") more cheaply than commercial banks through the "capital markets." Kregel argued this led banking regulators to eliminate Glass–Steagall restrictions to permit banks to "duplicate these structures" using the capital markets "until there was virtually no difference in the activities of FDIC-insured commercial banks and investment banks."

Comptroller Saxon had feared for the competitive viability of commercial banks in the early 1960s. The "capital markets" developments in the 1970s increased the vulnerability of commercial banks to nonbank competitors. As described below, this competition would increase in the 1980s.

==== Limited congressional and regulatory developments ====
In 1967, the Senate passed the first of several Senate passed bills that would have revised Glass–Steagall Section 16 to permit banks to underwrite municipal revenue bonds. In 1974 the OCC authorized national banks to provide "automatic investment services," which permitted bank customers to authorize regular withdrawals from a deposit account to purchase identified securities. In 1977 the Federal Reserve Board staff concluded Glass–Steagall permitted banks to privately place commercial paper. In 1978 Bankers Trust began making such placements. As described below, in 1978, the OCC authorized a national bank to privately place securities issued to sell residential mortgages in a securitization

Commercial banks, however, were frustrated with the continuing restrictions imposed by Glass–Steagall and other banking laws. After many of Comptroller Saxon's decisions granting national banks greater powers had been challenged or overturned by courts, commercial banking firms had been able to expand their non-securities activities through the "one bank holding company." Because the Bank Holding Company Act only limited nonbanking activities of companies that owned two or more commercial banks, "one bank holding companies" could own interests in any type of company other than securities firms covered by Glass–Steagall Section 20. That "loophole" in the Bank Holding Company Act was closed by a 1970 amendment to apply the Act to any company that owned a commercial bank. Commercial banking firm's continuing desire for greater powers received support when Ronald Reagan became President and appointed banking regulators who shared an "attitude towards deregulation of the financial industry."

=== Reagan Administration developments ===
==== State non-member bank and nonbank bank "loopholes" ====
In 1982, under the chairmanship of William Isaac, the FDIC issued a "policy statement" that state chartered non-Federal Reserve member banks could establish subsidiaries to underwrite and deal in securities. Also in 1982 the OCC, under Comptroller C. Todd Conover, approved the mutual fund company Dreyfus Corporation and the retailer Sears establishing "nonbank bank" subsidiaries that were not covered by the Bank Holding Company Act. The Federal Reserve Board, led by Chairman Paul Volcker, asked Congress to overrule both the FDIC's and the OCC's actions through new legislation.

The FDIC's action confirmed that Glass–Steagall did not restrict affiliations between a state chartered non-Federal Reserve System member bank and securities firms, even when the bank was FDIC insured. State laws differed in how they regulated affiliations between banks and securities firms. In the 1970s, foreign banks had taken advantage of this in establishing branches in states that permitted such affiliations. Although the International Banking Act of 1978 brought newly established foreign bank US branches under Glass–Steagall, foreign banks with existing US branches were "grandfathered" and permitted to retain their existing investments. Through this "loophole" Credit Suisse was able to own a controlling interest in First Boston, a leading US securities firm.

After the FDIC's action, commentators worried that large commercial banks would leave the Federal Reserve System (after first converting to a state charter if they were national banks) to free themselves from Glass–Steagall affiliation restrictions, as large commercial banks lobbied states to permit commercial bank investment banking activities.

The OCC's action relied on a "loophole" in the Bank Holding Company Act (BHCA) that meant a company only became a "bank holding company" supervised by the Federal Reserve Board if it owned a "bank" that made "commercial loans" (i.e., loans to businesses) and provided "demand deposits" (i.e., checking accounts). A "nonbank bank" could be established to provide checking accounts (but not commercial loans) or commercial loans (but not checking accounts). The company owning the nonbank bank would not be a bank holding company limited to activities "closely related to banking." This permitted Sears, GE, and other commercial companies to own "nonbank banks."

Glass–Steagall's affiliation restrictions applied if the nonbank bank was a national bank or otherwise a member of the Federal Reserve System. The OCC's permission for Dreyfus to own a nationally chartered "nonbank bank" was based on the OCC's conclusion that Dreyfus, as a mutual fund company, earned only a small amount of its revenue through underwriting and distributing shares in mutual funds. Two other securities firms, J. & W. Seligman & Co. and Prudential-Bache, established state chartered non-Federal Reserve System member banks to avoid Glass–Steagall restrictions on affiliations between member banks and securities firms.

==== Legislative response ====
Although Paul Volcker and the Federal Reserve Board sought legislation overruling the FDIC and OCC actions, they agreed bank affiliates should have broader securities powers. They supported a bill sponsored by Senate Banking Committee Chairman Jake Garn (R-UT) that would have amended Glass–Steagall Section 20 to cover all FDIC insured banks and to permit bank affiliates to underwrite and deal in mutual funds, municipal revenue bonds, commercial paper, and mortgage-backed securities. On September 13, 1984, the Senate passed the Garn bill in an 89-5 vote, but the Democratic controlled House did not act on the bill.

In 1987, however, the Senate (with a new Democratic Party majority) joined with the House in passing the Competitive Equality Banking Act of 1987 (CEBA). Although primarily dealing with the savings and loan crisis, CEBA also established a moratorium to March 1, 1988, on banking regulator actions to approve bank or affiliate securities activities, applied the affiliation restrictions of Glass–Steagall Sections 20 and 32 to all FDIC insured banks during the moratorium, and eliminated the "nonbank bank" loophole for new FDIC insured banks (whether they took demand deposits or made commercial loans) except industrial loan companies. Existing "nonbank banks", however, were "grandfathered" so that they could continue to operate without becoming subject to BHCA restrictions.

The CEBA was intended to provide time for Congress (rather than banking regulators) to review and resolve the Glass–Steagall issues of bank securities activities. Senator William Proxmire (D-WI), the new Chairman of the Senate Banking Committee, took up this topic in 1987.

==== International competitiveness debate ====
Wolfgang Reinicke argues that Glass–Steagall "repeal" gained unexpected Congressional support in 1987 because large banks successfully argued that Glass–Steagall prevented US banks from competing internationally. With the argument changed from preserving the profitability of large commercial banks to preserving the "competitiveness" of US banks (and of the US economy), Senator Proxmire reversed his earlier opposition to Glass–Steagall reform. Proxmire sponsored a bill that would have repealed Glass–Steagall Sections 20 and 32 and replaced those prohibitions with a system for regulating (and limiting the amount of) bank affiliate securities activities. He declared Glass–Steagall a "protectionist dinosaur."

By 1985 commercial banks provided 26% of short term loans to large businesses compared to 59% in 1974. While banks cited such statistics to illustrate the "decline of commercial banking," Reinicke argues the most influential factor in Congress favoring Glass–Steagall "repeal" was the decline of US banks in international rankings. In 1960 six of the ten largest banks were US based, by 1980 only two US based banks were in the top ten, and by 1989 none was in the top twenty five.

In the late 1980s the United Kingdom and Canada ended their historic separations of commercial and investment banking. Glass–Steagall critics scornfully noted only Japanese legislation imposed by Americans during the Occupation of Japan kept the United States from being alone in separating the two activities.

As noted above, even in the United States seventeen foreign banks were free from this Glass–Steagall restriction because they had established state chartered branches before the International Banking Act of 1978 brought newly established foreign bank US branches under Glass–Steagall. Similarly, because major foreign countries did not separate investment and commercial banking, US commercial banks could underwrite and deal in securities through branches outside the United States. Paul Volcker agreed that, "broadly speaking," it made no sense that US commercial banks could underwrite securities in Europe but not in the United States.

==== 1987 status of Glass–Steagall debate ====
Throughout the 1980s and 1990s, scholars published studies arguing that commercial bank affiliate underwriting during the 1920s was no worse, or was better, than underwriting by securities firms not affiliated with banks and that commercial banks were strengthened, not harmed, by securities affiliates. More generally, researchers attacked the idea that "integrated financial services firms" had played a role in creating the Great Depression or the collapse of the US banking system in the 1930s. If it was "debatable" whether Glass–Steagall was justified in the 1930s, it was easier to argue that Glass–Steagall served no legitimate purpose when the distinction between commercial and investment banking activities had been blurred by "market developments" since the 1960s.

Along with the "nonbank bank" "loophole" from BHCA limitations, in the 1980s the "unitary thrift" "loophole" became prominent as a means for securities and commercial firms to provide banking (or "near banking") products. The Savings and Loan Holding Company Act (SLHCA) permitted any company to own a single savings and loan. Only companies that owned two or more savings and loan were limited to thrift related businesses. Already in 1973, First Chicago Bank had identified Sears as its real competitor. Citicorp CEO Walter Wriston reached the same conclusion later in the 1970s. By 1982, using the "unitary thrift" and "nonbank bank" "loopholes," Sears had built the "Sears Financial Network", which combined "Super NOW" accounts and mortgage loans through a large California-based savings and loan, the Discover Card issued by a "nonbank bank" as a credit card, securities brokerage through Dean Witter Reynolds, home and auto insurance through Allstate, and real estate brokerage through Coldwell Banker. By 1984, however, Walter Wriston concluded "the bank of the future already exists, and it's called Merrill Lynch." In 1986 when major bank holding companies threatened to stop operating commercial banks in order to obtain the "competitive advantages" enjoyed by Sears and Merrill Lynch, FDIC Chairman William Seidman warned that could create "chaos."

In a 1987, "issue brief" the Congressional Research Service (CRS) summarized "some of" the major arguments

for preserving Glass–Steagall as:

1. Conflicts of interest characterize the granting of credit (lending) and the use of credit (investing) by the same entity, which led to abuses that originally produced the Act.
2. Depository institutions possess enormous financial power, by virtue of their control of other people's money; its extent must be limited to ensure soundness and competition in the market for funds, whether loans or investments.
3. Securities activities can be risky, leading to enormous losses. Such losses could threaten the integrity of deposits. In turn, the Government insures deposits and could be required to pay large sums if depository institutions were to collapse as the result of securities losses.
4. Depository institutions are supposed to be managed to limit risk. Their managers thus may not be conditioned to operate prudently in more speculative securities businesses. An example is the crash of real estate investment trusts sponsored by bank holding companies a decade ago.

and against preserving Glass–Steagall as:

1. Depository institutions now operate in "deregulated" financial markets in which distinctions between loans, securities, and deposits are not well drawn. They are losing market shares to securities firms that are not so strictly regulated, and to foreign financial institutions operating without much restriction from the Act.
2. Conflicts of interest can be prevented by enforcing legislation against them, and by separating the lending and credit functions through forming distinctly separate subsidiaries of financial firms.
3. The securities activities that depository institutions are seeking are both low-risk by their very nature, and would reduce the total risk of organizations offering them – by diversification.
4. In much of the rest of the world, depository institutions operate simultaneously and successfully in both banking and securities markets. Lessons learned from their experience can be applied to our national financial structure and regulation.

Reflecting the significance of the "international competitiveness" argument, a separate CRS Report stated banks were "losing historical market shares of their major activities to domestic and foreign competitors that are less restricted."

Separately, the General Accounting Office (GAO) submitted to a House subcommittee a report reviewing the benefits and risks of "Glass–Steagall repeal." The report recommended a "phased approach" using a "holding company organizational structure" if Congress chose "repeal." Noting Glass–Steagall had "already been eroded and the erosion is likely to continue in the future," the GAO explained "coming to grips with the Glass–Steagall repeal question represents an opportunity to systematically and rationally address changes in the regulatory and legal structure that are needed to better address the realities of the marketplace." The GAO warned that Congress's failure to act was "potentially dangerous" in permitting a "continuation of the uneven integration of commercial and investment banking activities."

As Congress was considering the Proxmire Financial Modernization Act in 1988, the Commission of the European Communities proposed a "Second Banking Directive" that became effective at the beginning of 1993 and provided for the combination of commercial and investment banking throughout the European Economic Community. Whereas United States law sought to isolate banks from securities activities, the Second Directive represented the European Union's conclusion that securities activities diversified bank risk, strengthening the earnings and stability of banks.

The Senate passed the Proxmire Financial Modernization Act of 1988 in a 94-2 vote. The House did not pass a similar bill, largely because of opposition from Representative John Dingell (D-MI), chairman of the House Commerce and Energy Committee.

=== Section 20 affiliates ===
In April 1987, the Federal Reserve Board had approved the bank holding companies Bankers Trust, Citicorp, and J.P. Morgan & Co. establishing subsidiaries ("Section 20 affiliates") to underwrite and deal in residential mortgage-backed securities, municipal revenue bonds, and commercial paper. Glass–Steagall's Section 20 prohibited a bank from affiliating with a firm "primarily engaged" in underwriting and dealing in securities. The Board decided this meant Section 20 permitted a bank affiliate to earn 5% of its revenue from underwriting and dealing in these types of securities that were not "bank-eligible securities," subject to various restrictions including "firewalls" to separate a commercial bank from its Section 20 affiliate. Three months later the Board added "asset-backed securities" backed by pools of credit card accounts or other "consumer finance assets" to the list of "bank-ineligible securities" a Section 20 affiliate could underwrite. Bank holding companies, not commercial banks directly, owned these Section 20 affiliates.

In 1978 the Federal Reserve Board had authorized bank holding companies to establish securities affiliates that underwrote and dealt in government securities and other bank-eligible securities. Federal Reserve Board Chairman Paul Volcker supported Congress amending Glass–Steagall to permit such affiliates to underwrite and deal in a limited amount of bank-ineligible securities, but not corporate securities. In 1987, Volcker specifically noted (and approved the result) that this would mean only banks with large government securities activities would be able to have affiliates that would underwrite and deal in a significant volume of "bank-ineligible securities." A Section 20 affiliate with a large volume of government securities related revenue would be able to earn a significant amount of "bank-ineligible" revenue without having more than 5% of its overall revenue come from bank-ineligible activities. Volcker disagreed, however, that the Board had authority to permit this without an amendment to the Glass–Steagall Act. Citing that concern, Volcker and fellow Federal Reserve Board Governor Wayne Angell dissented from the Section 20 affiliate orders.

Senator Proxmire criticized the Federal Reserve Board's Section 20 affiliate orders as defying Congressional control of Glass–Steagall. The Board's orders meant Glass–Steagall did not prevent commercial banks from affiliating with securities firms underwriting and dealing in "bank-ineligible securities," so long as the activity was "executed in a separate subsidiary and limited in amount."

After the Proxmire Financial Modernization Act of 1988 failed to become law, Senator Proxmire and a group of fellow Democratic senior House Banking Committee members (including future Committee Ranking Member John LaFalce (D-NY) and future Committee Chairman Barney Frank (D-MA)) wrote the Federal Reserve Board recommending it expand the underwriting powers of Section 20 affiliates. Expressing sentiments that Representative James A. Leach (R-IA) repeated in 1996, Proxmire declared "Congress has failed to do the job" and "[n]ow it's time for the Fed to step in."

Following Senator Proxmire's letter, in 1989 the Federal Reserve Board approved Section 20 affiliates underwriting corporate debt securities and increased from 5% to 10% the percentage of its revenue a Section 20 affiliate could earn from "bank-ineligible" activities. In 1990 the Board approved J.P. Morgan & Co. underwriting corporate stock. With the commercial (J.P. Morgan & Co.) and investment (Morgan Stanley) banking arms of the old "House of Morgan" both underwriting corporate bonds and stocks, Wolfgang Reinicke concluded the Federal Reserve Board order meant both firms now competed in "a single financial market offering both commercial and investment banking products," which "Glass–Steagall sought to rule out." Reinicke described this as "de facto repeal of Glass–Steagall."

No Federal Reserve Board order was necessary for Morgan Stanley to enter that "single financial market." Glass–Steagall only prohibited investment banks from taking deposits, not from making commercial loans, and the prohibition on taking deposits had "been circumvented by the development of deposit equivalents", such as the money market fund. Glass–Steagall also did not prevent investment banks from affiliating with nonbank banks or savings and loans. Citing this competitive "inequality," before the Federal Reserve Board approved any Section 20 affiliates, four large bank holding companies that eventually received Section 20 affiliate approvals (Chase, J.P. Morgan, Citicorp, and Bankers Trust) had threatened to give up their banking charters if they were not given greater securities powers. Following the Federal Reserve Board's approvals of Section 20 affiliates a commentator concluded that the Glass–Steagall "wall" between commercial banking and "the securities and investment business" was "porous" for commercial banks and "nonexistent to investment bankers and other nonbank entities."

=== Greenspan-led Federal Reserve Board ===
Alan Greenspan had replaced Paul Volcker as Chairman of the Federal Reserve Board when Proxmire sent his 1988 letter recommending the Federal Reserve Board expand the underwriting powers of Section 20 affiliates. Greenspan testified to Congress in December 1987, that the Federal Reserve Board supported Glass–Steagall repeal. Although Paul Volcker "had changed his position" on Glass–Steagall reform "considerably" during the 1980s, he was still "considered a conservative among the board members." With Greenspan as Chairman, the Federal Reserve Board "spoke with one voice" in joining the FDIC and OCC in calling for Glass–Steagall repeal.

By 1987, Glass–Steagall "repeal" had come to mean repeal of Sections 20 and 32. The Federal Reserve Board supported "repeal" of Glass–Steagall "insofar as it prevents bank holding companies from being affiliated with firms engaged in securities underwriting and dealing activities." The Board did not propose repeal of Glass Steagall Section 16 or 21. Bank holding companies, through separately capitalized subsidiaries, not commercial banks themselves directly, would exercise the new securities powers.

Banks and bank holding companies had already gained important regulatory approvals for securities activities before Paul Volcker retired as Chairman of the Federal Reserve Board on August 11, 1987. Aside from the Board's authorizations for Section 20 affiliates and for bank private placements of commercial paper, by 1987 federal banking regulators had authorized banks or their affiliates to (1) sponsor closed end investment companies, (2) sponsor mutual funds sold to customers in individual retirement accounts, (3) provide customers full service brokerage (i.e., advice and brokerage), and (4) sell bank assets through "securitizations."

In 1982, E. Gerald Corrigan, president of the Federal Reserve Bank of Minneapolis and a close Volcker colleague, published an influential essay titled "Are banks special?" in which he argued banks should be subject to special restrictions on affiliations because they enjoy special benefits (e.g., deposit insurance and Federal Reserve Bank loan facilities) and have special responsibilities (e.g., operating the payment system and influencing the money supply). The essay rejected the argument that it is "futile and unnecessary" to distinguish among the various types of companies in the "financial services industry."

While Paul Volcker's January 1984, testimony to Congress repeated that banks are "special" in performing "a unique and critical role in the financial system and the economy," he still testified in support of bank affiliates underwriting securities other than corporate bonds. In its 1986 Annual Report the Volcker led Federal Reserve Board recommended that Congress permit bank holding companies to underwrite municipal revenue bonds, mortgage-backed securities, commercial paper, and mutual funds and that Congress "undertake hearings or other studies in the area of corporate underwriting." As described above, in the 1930s Glass–Steagall advocates had alleged that bank affiliate underwriting of corporate bonds created "conflicts of interest."

In early 1987, E. Gerald Corrigan, then president of the Federal Reserve Bank of New York, recommended a legislative "overhaul" to permit "financial holding companies" that would "in time" provide banking, securities, and insurance services (as authorized by the GLBA 12 years later). In 1990 Corrigan testified to Congress that he rejected the "status quo" and recommended allowing banks into the "securities business" through financial service holding companies.

In 1991, Paul Volcker testified to Congress in support of the Bush Administration proposal to repeal Glass–Steagall Sections 20 and 32. Volcker rejected the Bush Administration proposal to permit affiliations between banks and commercial firms (i.e., non-financial firms) and added that legislation to allow banks greater insurance powers "could be put off until a later date."

=== 1991 Congressional action and "firewalls" ===
Paul Volcker gave his 1991 testimony as Congress considered repealing Glass–Steagall sections 20 and 32 as part of a broader Bush Administration proposal to reform financial regulation. In reaction to "market developments" and regulatory and judicial decisions that had "homogenized" commercial and investment banking, Representative Edward J. Markey (D-MA) had written a 1990 article arguing "Congress must amend Glass–Steagall." As chairman of a subcommittee of the House Commerce and Energy Committee, Markey had joined with Committee Chairman Dingell in opposing the 1988 Proxmire Financial Modernization Act. In 1990, however, Markey stated Glass–Steagall had "lost much of its effectiveness" through market, regulatory, and judicial developments that were "tantamount to an ill-coordinated, incremental repeal" of Glass–Steagall. To correct this "disharmony" Markey proposed replacing Glass–Steagall's "prohibitions" with "regulation." After the House Banking Committee approved a bill repealing Glass–Steagall Sections 20 and 32, Representative Dingell again stopped House action. He reached agreement with Banking Committee Chairman Henry B. González (D-TX) to insert into the bill "firewalls" that banks claimed would prevent real competition between banks and securities firms. The banking industry strongly opposed the bill in that form, and the House rejected it. The House debate revealed that Congress might agree on repealing Sections 20 and 32 while being divided on how bank affiliations with securities firms should be regulated.

=== 1980s and 1990s bank product developments ===
Throughout the 1980s and 1990s, as Congress considered whether to "repeal" Glass–Steagall, commercial banks and their affiliates engaged in activities that commentators later linked to the 2008 financial crisis.

==== Securitization, CDOs, and "subprime" credit ====
In 1978, Bank of America issued the first residential mortgage-backed security that securitized residential mortgages not guaranteed by a government-sponsored enterprise ("private label RMBS"). Also in 1978, the OCC approved a national bank, such as Bank of America, issuing pass-through certificates representing interests in residential mortgages and distributing such mortgage-backed securities to investors in a private placement. In 1987 the OCC ruled that Security Pacific Bank could "sell" assets through "securitizations" that transferred "cash flows" from those assets to investors and also distribute in a registered public offering the residential mortgage-backed securities issued in the securitization. This permitted commercial banks to acquire assets for "sale" through securitizations under what later became termed the "originate to distribute" model of banking.

The OCC ruled that a national bank's power to sell its assets meant a national bank could sell a pool of assets in a securitization, and even distribute the securities that represented the sale, as part of the "business of banking." This meant national banks could underwrite and distribute securities representing such sales, even though Glass–Steagall would generally prohibit a national bank underwriting or distributing non-governmental securities (i.e., non-"bank-eligible" securities). The federal courts upheld the OCC's approval of Security Pacific's securitization activities, with the Supreme Court refusing in 1990 to review a 1989 Second Circuit decision sustaining the OCC's action. In arguing that the GLBA's "repeal" of Glass–Steagall played no role in the 2008 financial crisis, Melanie Fein notes courts had confirmed by 1990 the power of banks to securitize their assets under Glass–Steagall.

The Second Circuit stated banks had been securitizing their assets for "ten years" before the OCC's 1987 approval of Security Pacific's securitization. As noted above, the OCC had approved such activity in 1978. Jan Kregel argues that the OCC's interpretation of the "incidental powers" of national banks "ultimately eviscerated Glass–Steagall."

Continental Illinois Bank is often credited with issuing the first collateralized debt obligation (CDO) when, in 1987, it issued securities representing interests in a pool of "leveraged loans."

By the late 1980s, Citibank had become a major provider of "subprime" mortgages and credit cards. Arthur Wilmarth argued that the ability to securitize such credits encouraged banks to extend more "subprime" credit. Wilmarth reported that during the 1990s credit card loans increased at a faster pace for lower-income households than higher-income households and that subprime mortgage loan volume quadrupled from 1993–99, before the GLBA became effective in 2000. In 1995 Wilmarth noted that commercial bank mortgage lenders differed from nonbank lenders in retaining "a significant portion of their mortgage loans" rather than securitizing the entire exposure. Wilmarth also shared the bank regulator concern that commercial banks sold their "best assets" in securitizations and retained their riskiest assets.

==== ABCP conduits and SIVs ====
In the early 1980s commercial banks established asset backed commercial paper conduits (ABCP conduits) to finance corporate customer receivables. The ABCP conduit purchased receivables from the bank customer and issued asset-backed commercial paper to finance that purchase. The bank "advising" the ABCP conduit provided loan commitments and "credit enhancements" that supported repayment of the commercial paper. Because the ABCP conduit was owned by a third party unrelated to the bank, it was not an affiliate of the bank. Through ABCP conduits banks could earn "fee income" and meet "customers' needs for credit" without "the need to maintain the amount of capital that would be required if loans were extended directly" to those customers.

By the late 1980s Citibank had established ABCP conduits to buy securities. Such conduits became known as structured investment vehicles (SIVs). The SIV's "arbitrage" opportunity was to earn the difference between the interest earned on the securities it purchased and the interest it paid on the ABCP and other securities it issued to fund those purchases.

==== OTC derivatives, including credit default swaps ====
In the early 1980s, commercial banks began entering into interest rate and currency exchange "swaps" with customers. This "over-the-counter derivatives" market grew dramatically throughout the 1980s and 1990s.

In 1996, the OCC issued "guidelines" for national bank use of "credit default swaps" and other "credit derivatives." Banks entered into "credit default swaps" to protect against defaults on loans. Banks later entered into such swaps to protect against defaults on securities. Banks acted both as "dealers" in providing such protection (or speculative "exposure") to customers and as "hedgers" or "speculators" to cover (or create) their own exposures to such risks.

Commercial banks became the largest dealers in swaps and other over-the-counter derivatives. Banking regulators ruled that swaps (including credit default swaps) were part of the "business of banking," not "securities" under the Glass–Steagall Act.

Commercial banks entered into swaps that replicated part or all of the economics of actual securities. Regulators eventually ruled banks could even buy and sell equity securities to "hedge" this activity. Jan Kregel argues the OCC's approval of bank derivatives activities under bank "incidental powers" constituted a "complete reversal of the original intention of preventing banks from dealing in securities on their own account."

== Glass–Steagall developments from 1995 to Gramm–Leach–Bliley Act ==
=== Leach and Rubin support for Glass–Steagall "repeal"; need to address "market realities" ===
On January 4, 1995, the new Chairman of the House Banking Committee, Representative James A. Leach (R-IA), introduced a bill to repeal Glass–Steagall Sections 20 and 32. After being confirmed as Treasury Secretary, Robert Rubin announced on February 28, 1995, that the Clinton Administration supported such Glass–Steagall repeal. Repeating themes from the 1980s, Leach stated Glass–Steagall was "out of synch with reality" and Rubin argued "it is now time for the laws to reflect changes in the world's financial system."

Leach and Rubin expressed a widely shared view that Glass–Steagall was "obsolete" or "outdated." As described above, Senator Proxmire and Representative Markey (despite their long-time support for Glass–Steagall) had earlier expressed the same conclusion. With his reputation for being "conservative" on expanded bank activities, former Federal Reserve Board Chairman Paul Volcker remained an influential commentator on legislative proposals to permit such activities. Volcker continued to testify to Congress in opposition to permitting banks to affiliate with commercial companies and in favor of repealing Glass–Steagall Sections 20 and 32 as part of "rationalizing" bank involvement in securities markets. Supporting the Leach and Rubin arguments, Volcker testified that Congressional inaction had forced banking regulators and the courts to play "catch-up" with market developments by "sometimes stretching established interpretations of law beyond recognition." In 1997 Volcker testified this meant the "Glass–Steagall separation of commercial and investment banking is now almost gone" and that this "accommodation and adaptation has been necessary and desirable." He stated, however, that the "ad hoc approach" had created "uneven results" that created "almost endless squabbling in the courts" and an "increasingly advantageous position competitively" for "some sectors of the financial service industry and particular institutions." Similar to the GAO in 1988 and Representative Markey in 1990 Volcker asked that Congress "provide clear and decisive leadership that reflects not parochial pleadings but the national interest."

Reflecting the regulatory developments Volcker noted, the commercial and investment banking industries largely reversed their traditional Glass–Steagall positions. Throughout the 1990s (and particularly in 1996), commercial banking firms became content with the regulatory situation Volcker described. They feared "financial modernization" legislation might bring an unwelcome change. Securities firms came to view Glass–Steagall more as a barrier to expanding their own commercial banking activities than as protection from commercial bank competition. The securities industry became an advocate for "financial modernization" that would open a "two-way street" for securities firms to enter commercial banking.

=== Status of arguments from 1980s ===
While the need to create a legal framework for existing bank securities activities became a dominant theme for the "financial modernization" legislation supported by Leach, Rubin, Volcker, and others, after the GLBA repealed Glass–Steagall Sections 20 and 32 in 1999, commentators identified four main arguments for repeal: (1) increased economies of scale and scope, (2) reduced risk through diversification of activities, (3) greater convenience and lower cost for consumers, and (4) improved ability of U.S. financial firms to compete with foreign firms.

By 1995, however, some of these concerns (which had been identified by the Congressional Research Service in 1987) seemed less important. As Japanese banks declined and U.S.-based banks were more profitable, "international competitiveness" did not seem to be a pressing issue. International rankings of banks by size also seemed less important when, as Alan Greenspan later noted, "Federal Reserve research had been unable to find economies of scale in banking beyond a modest size." Still, advocates of "financial modernization" continued to point to the combination of commercial and investment banking in nearly all other countries as an argument for "modernization", including Glass–Steagall "repeal."

Similarly, the failure of the Sears Financial Network and other nonbank "financial supermarkets" that had seemed to threaten commercial banks in the 1980s undermined the argument that financial conglomerates would be more efficient than "specialized" financial firms. Critics questioned the "diversification benefits" of combining commercial and investment banking activities. Some questioned whether the higher variability of returns in investment banking would stabilize commercial banking firms through "negative correlation" (i.e., cyclical downturns in commercial and investment banking occurring at different times) or instead increase the probability of the overall banking firm failing. Others questioned whether any theoretical benefits in holding a passive "investment portfolio" combining commercial and investment banking would be lost in managing the actual combination of such activities. Critics also argued that specialized, highly competitive commercial and investment banking firms were more efficient in competitive global markets.

Starting in the late 1980s, John H. Boyd, a staff member of the Federal Reserve Bank of Minneapolis, consistently questioned the value of size and product diversification in banking. In 1999, as Congress was considering legislation that became the GLBA, he published an essay arguing that the "moral hazard" created by deposit insurance, too big to fail (TBTF) considerations, and other governmental support for banking should be resolved before commercial banking firms could be given "universal banking" powers. Although Boyd's 1999 essay was directed at "universal banking" that permitted commercial banks to own equity interests in non-financial firms (i.e., "commercial firms"), the essay was interpreted more broadly to mean that "expanding bank powers, by, for example, allowing nonbank firms to affiliate with banks, prior to undertaking reforms limiting TBTF-like coverage for uninsured bank creditors is putting the 'cart before the horse.'"

Despite these arguments, advocates of "financial modernization" predicted consumers and businesses would enjoy cost savings and greater convenience in receiving financial services from integrated "financial services firms."

After the GLBA repealed Sections 20 and 32, commentators also noted the importance of scholarly attacks on the historic justifications for Glass–Steagall as supporting repeal efforts. Throughout the 1990s, scholars continued to produce empirical studies concluding that commercial bank affiliate underwriting before Glass–Steagall had not demonstrated the "conflicts of interest" and other defects claimed by Glass–Steagall proponents. By the late 1990s a "remarkably broad academic consensus" existed that Glass–Steagall had been "thoroughly discredited."

Although he rejected this scholarship, Martin Mayer wrote in 1997 that since the late 1980s, it had been "clear" that continuing the Glass–Steagall prohibitions was only "permitting a handful of large investment houses and hedge funds to charge monopoly rents for their services without protecting corporate America, investors, or the banks."Hyman Minsky, who disputed the benefits of "universal banking," wrote in 1995 testimony prepared for Congress that "repeal of the Glass–Steagall Act, in itself, would neither benefit nor harm the economy of the United States to any significant extent." In 1974, Mayer had quoted Minsky as stating a 1971 presidential commission (the "Hunt Commission") was repeating the errors of history when it proposed relaxing Glass–Steagall and other legislation from the 1930s.

With banking commentators such as Mayer and Minsky no longer opposing Glass–Steagall repeal, consumer and community development advocates became the most prominent critics of repeal and of financial "modernization" in general. Helen Garten argued that bank regulation became dominated by "consumer" issues, which produced "a largely unregulated, sophisticated wholesale market and a highly regulated, retail consumer market." In the 1980s Representative Fernand St. Germain (D-RI), as chairman of the House Banking Committee, sought to tie any Glass–Steagall reform to requirements for free or reduced cost banking services for the elderly and poor. Democratic Representatives and Senators made similar appeals in the 1990s. During Congressional hearings to consider the various Leach bills to repeal Sections 20 and 32, consumer and community development advocates warned against the concentration of "economic power" that would result from permitting "financial conglomerates" and argued that any repeal of Sections 20 and 32 should mandate greater consumer protections, particularly free or low cost consumer services, and greater community reinvestment requirements.

=== Failed 1995 Leach bill; expansion of Section 20 affiliate activities; merger of Travelers and Citicorp ===
By 1995 the ability of banks to sell insurance was more controversial than Glass–Steagall "repeal." Representative Leach tried to avoid conflict with the insurance industry by producing a limited "modernization" bill that repealed Glass–Steagall Sections 20 and 32, but did not change the regulation of bank insurance activities. Leach's efforts to separate insurance from securities powers failed when the insurance agent lobby insisted any banking law reform include limits on bank sales of insurance.

Similar to Senator Proxmire in 1988, Representative Leach responded to the House's inaction on his Glass–Steagall "repeal" bill by writing the Federal Reserve Board in June 1996 encouraging it to increase the limit on Section 20 affiliate bank-ineligible revenue. When the Federal Reserve Board increased the limit to 25% in December 1996, the Board noted the Securities Industry Association (SIA) had complained this would mean even the largest Wall Street securities firms could affiliate with commercial banks.

The SIA's prediction proved accurate two years later when the Federal Reserve Board applied the 25% bank-ineligible revenue test in approving Salomon Smith Barney (SSB) becoming an affiliate of Citibank through the merger of Travelers and Citicorp to form the Citigroup bank holding company. The Board noted that, although SSB was one of the largest US securities firms, less than 25% of its revenue was "bank-ineligible." Citigroup could only continue to own the Travelers insurance underwriting business for two (or, with Board approval, five) years unless the Bank Holding Company Act was amended (as it was through the GLBA) to permit affiliations between banks and underwriters of property, casualty, and life insurance. Citigroup's ownership of SSB, however, was permitted without any law change under the Federal Reserve Board's existing Section 20 affiliate rules.

In 2003, Charles Geisst, a Glass–Steagall supporter, told Frontline the Federal Reserve Board's Section 20 orders meant the Federal Reserve "got rid of the Glass–Steagall Act." Former Federal Reserve Board Vice-Chairman Alan Blinder agreed the 1996 action increasing "bank-ineligible" revenue limits was "tacit repeal" of Glass–Steagall, but argued "that the market had practically repealed Glass–Steagall, anyway."

Shortly after approving the merger of Citicorp and Travelers, the Federal Reserve Board announced its intention to eliminate the 28 "firewalls" that required separation of Section 20 affiliates from their affiliated bank and to replace them with "operating standards" based on 8 of the firewalls. The change permitted banks to lend to fund purchases of, and otherwise provide credit support to, securities underwritten by their Section 20 affiliates. This left Federal Reserve Act Sections 23A (which originated in the 1933 Banking Act and regulated extensions of credit between a bank and any nonbank affiliate) and 23B (which required all transactions between a bank and its nonbank affiliates to be on "arms-length" market terms) as the primary restrictions on banks providing credit to Section 20 affiliates or to securities underwritten by those affiliates. Sections 23A and B remained the primary restrictions on commercial banks extending credit to securities affiliates, or to securities underwritten by such affiliates, after the GLBA repealed Glass–Steagall Sections 20 and 32.

=== 1997-98 legislative developments: commercial affiliations and Community Reinvestment Act ===
In 1997, Representative Leach again sponsored a bill to repeal Glass–Steagall Sections 20 and 32. At first the main controversy was whether to permit limited affiliations between commercial firms and commercial banks. Securities firms (and other financial services firms) complained that unless they could retain their affiliations with commercial firms (which the Bank Holding Company Act forbid for a commercial bank), they would not be able to compete equally with commercial banks. The Clinton Administration proposed that Congress either permit a small "basket" of commercial revenue for bank holding companies or that it retain the "unitary thrift loophole" that permitted a commercial firm to own a single savings and loan. Representative Leach, House Banking Committee Ranking Member Henry Gonzalez (D-TX), and former Federal Reserve Board Chairman Paul Volcker opposed such commercial affiliations.

Meanwhile, in 1997 Congressional Quarterly reported Senate Banking Committee Chairman Al D'Amato (R-NY) rejected Treasury Department pressure to produce a financial modernization bill because banking firms (such as Citicorp) were satisfied with the competitive advantages they had received from regulatory actions and were not really interested in legislative reforms. Reflecting the process Paul Volcker had described, as financial reform legislation was considered throughout 1997 and early 1998, Congressional Quarterly reported how different interests groups blocked legislation and sought regulatory advantages.

The "compromise bill" the House Republican leadership sought to bring to a vote in March 1998, was opposed by the commercial banking industry as favoring the securities and insurance industries. The House Republican leadership withdrew the bill in response to the banking industry opposition, but vowed to bring it back when Congress returned from recess. Commentators describe the April 6, 1998, merger announcement between Travelers and Citicorp as the catalyst for the House passing that bill by a single vote (214-213) on May 13, 1998. Citicorp, which had opposed the bill in March, changed its position to support the bill along with the few other large commercial banking firms that had supported it in March for improving their ability to compete with "foreign banks."

The Clinton Administration issued a veto threat for the House passed bill, in part because the bill would eliminate "the longstanding right of unitary thrift holding companies to engage in any lawful business," but primarily because the bill required national banks to conduct expanded activities through holding company subsidiaries rather than the bank "operating subsidiaries" authorized by the OCC in 1996.

On September 11, 1998, the Senate Banking Committee approved a bipartisan bill with unanimous Democratic member support that, like the House-passed bill, would have repealed Glass–Steagall Sections 20 and 32. The bill was blocked from Senate consideration by the Committee's two dissenting members (Phil Gramm (R-TX) and Richard Shelby (R-AL)), who argued it expanded the Community Reinvestment Act (CRA). Four Democratic senators (Byron Dorgan (D-ND), Russell Feingold (D-WI), Barbara Mikulski (D-MD), and Paul Wellstone (D-MN)) stated they opposed the bill for its repeal of Sections 20 and 32.

=== 1999 Gramm–Leach–Bliley Act ===
In 1999 the main issues confronting the new Leach bill to repeal Sections 20 and 32 were (1) whether bank subsidiaries ("operating subsidiaries") or only nonbank owned affiliates could exercise new securities and other powers and (2) how the CRA would apply to the new "financial holding companies" that would have such expanded powers. The Clinton Administration agreed with Representative Leach in supporting "the continued separation of banking and commerce."

The Senate Banking Committee approved in a straight party line 11-9 vote a bill (S. 900) sponsored by Senator Gramm that would have repealed Glass–Steagall Sections 20 and 32 and that did not contain the CRA provisions in the Committee's 1998 bill. The nine dissenting Democratic Senators, along with Senate Minority Leader Thomas Daschle (D-SD), proposed as an alternative (S. 753) the text of the 1998 Committee bill with its CRA provisions and the repeal of Sections 20 and 32, modified to provide greater permission for "operating subsidiaries" as requested by the Treasury Department. Through a partisan 54-44 vote on May 6, 1999 (with Senator Fritz Hollings (D-SC) providing the only Democratic Senator vote in support), the Senate passed S. 900. The day before, Senate Republicans defeated (in a 54-43 vote) a Democratic sponsored amendment to S. 900 that would have substituted the text of S. 753 (also providing for the repeal of Glass–Steagall Sections 20 and 32).

On July 1, 1999, the House of Representatives passed (in a bipartisan 343-86 vote) a bill (H.R. 10) that repealed Sections 20 and 32. The Clinton Administration issued a statement supporting H.R. 10 because (unlike the Senate passed S. 900) it accepted the bill's CRA and operating subsidiary provisions.

On October 13, 1999, the Federal Reserve and Treasury Department agreed that direct subsidiaries of national banks ("financial subsidiaries") could conduct securities activities, but that bank holding companies would need to engage in merchant banking, insurance, and real estate development activities through holding company, not bank, subsidiaries. On October 22, 1999, Senator Gramm and the Clinton Administration agreed a bank holding company could only become a "financial holding company" (and thereby enjoy the new authority to affiliate with insurance and securities firms) if all its bank subsidiaries had at least a "satisfactory" CRA rating.

After these compromises, a joint Senate and House Conference Committee reported out a final version of S. 900 that was passed on November 4, 1999, by the House in a vote of 362-57 and by the Senate in a vote of 90-8. President Clinton signed the bill into law on November 12, 1999, as the Gramm–Leach–Bliley Financial Modernization Act of 1999 (GLBA).

The GLBA repealed Sections 20 and 32 of the Glass–Steagall Act, not Sections 16 and 21. The GLBA also amended Section 16 to permit "well capitalized" commercial banks to underwrite municipal revenue bonds (i.e., non-general obligation bonds), as first approved by the Senate in 1967. Otherwise, Sections 16 and 21 remained in effect regulating the direct securities activities of banks and prohibiting securities firms from taking deposits.

After March 11, 2000, bank holding companies could expand their securities and insurance activities by becoming "financial holding companies."

== Aftermath of repeal ==
Please see the main article, Aftermath of the repeal of the Glass–Steagall Act, which has sections for the following:

- Section 1, Commentator response to Section 20 and 32 repeal
- Section 2, Financial industry developments after repeal of Sections 20 and 32
- Section 3, Glass–Steagall "repeal" and the financial crisis

The above article also contains information on proposed reenactment, or alternative proposals that will have the same effect or a partial reinstatement effect.
