= Glass–Steagall legislation =

Four provisions of the Banking Act of 1933, separating commercial and investment banking

Banking Act of 1933
- Long title: An Act To provide for the safer and more effective use of the assets of banks, to regulate interbank control, to prevent the undue diversion of funds into speculative operations, and for other purposes.
- Nicknames: Glass–Steagall Act
- Enacted by: the 73rd United States Congress
- Effective: June 16, 1933

Citations
- Public law: Pub. L. 73–66
- Statutes at Large: 48 Stat. 162

Codification
- Acts amended: Federal Reserve Act, National Bank Act, Clayton Act

Legislative history
- Introduced in the House of Representatives as H.R. 5661 by Henry B. Steagall (D–AL) and Carter Glass (D–VA) on May 10, 1933; Committee consideration by House Committee on Banking and Currency, Senate Committee on Banking and Currency; Passed the House on May 23, 1933 (Voice vote); Passed the Senate as the with amendment on May 25, 1933 (Voice vote); Reported by the joint conference committee on June 12, 1933; agreed to by the House on June 13, 1933 (Voice vote) and by the Senate on June 13, 1933 (Voice vote); Signed into law by President Franklin D. Roosevelt on June 16, 1933

Major amendments
- Banking Act of 1935, Gramm–Leach–Bliley Act (partial repeal, 1999)

The Glass–Steagall legislation describes four provisions of the United States Banking Act of 1933 separating commercial and investment banking.

As with the Glass–Steagall Act of 1932, the common name comes from the names of the Congressional sponsors, Senator Carter Glass and Representative Henry B. Steagall.

The separation of commercial and investment banking prevented securities firms and investment banks from taking deposits and commercial Federal Reserve member banks from:

- dealing in non-governmental securities for customers;
- investing in non-investment grade securities for themselves;
- underwriting or distributing non-governmental securities;
- affiliating (or sharing employees) with companies involved in such activities.

Starting in the early 1960s, federal banking regulators' interpretations of the Act permitted commercial banks, and especially commercial bank affiliates, to engage in an expanding list and volume of securities activities. Congressional efforts to "repeal the Glass–Steagall Act", referring to those four provisions (and then usually to only the two provisions that restricted affiliations between commercial banks and securities firms), culminated in the 1999 Gramm–Leach–Bliley Act (GLBA), which repealed the two provisions restricting affiliations between banks and securities firms.

By that time, many commentators argued Glass–Steagall was already "dead". Most notably, Citibank's 1998 affiliation with Salomon Smith Barney, one of the largest U.S. securities firms, was permitted under the Federal Reserve Board's then existing interpretation of the Glass–Steagall Act. In November 1999, President Bill Clinton publicly declared that "the Glass–Steagall law is no longer appropriate".

Some commentators have stated that the GLBA's repeal of the affiliation restrictions of the Glass–Steagall Act was an important cause of the 2008 financial crisis. Nobel Memorial Prize in Economics laureate Joseph Stiglitz argued that the effect of the repeal was "indirect": "[w]hen repeal of Glass-Steagall brought investment and commercial banks together, the investment-bank culture came out on top". Economists at the Federal Reserve, such as Chairman Ben Bernanke, have argued that the activities linked to the 2008 financial crisis were not prohibited (or, in most cases, even regulated) by the Glass–Steagall Act.

== Sponsors ==
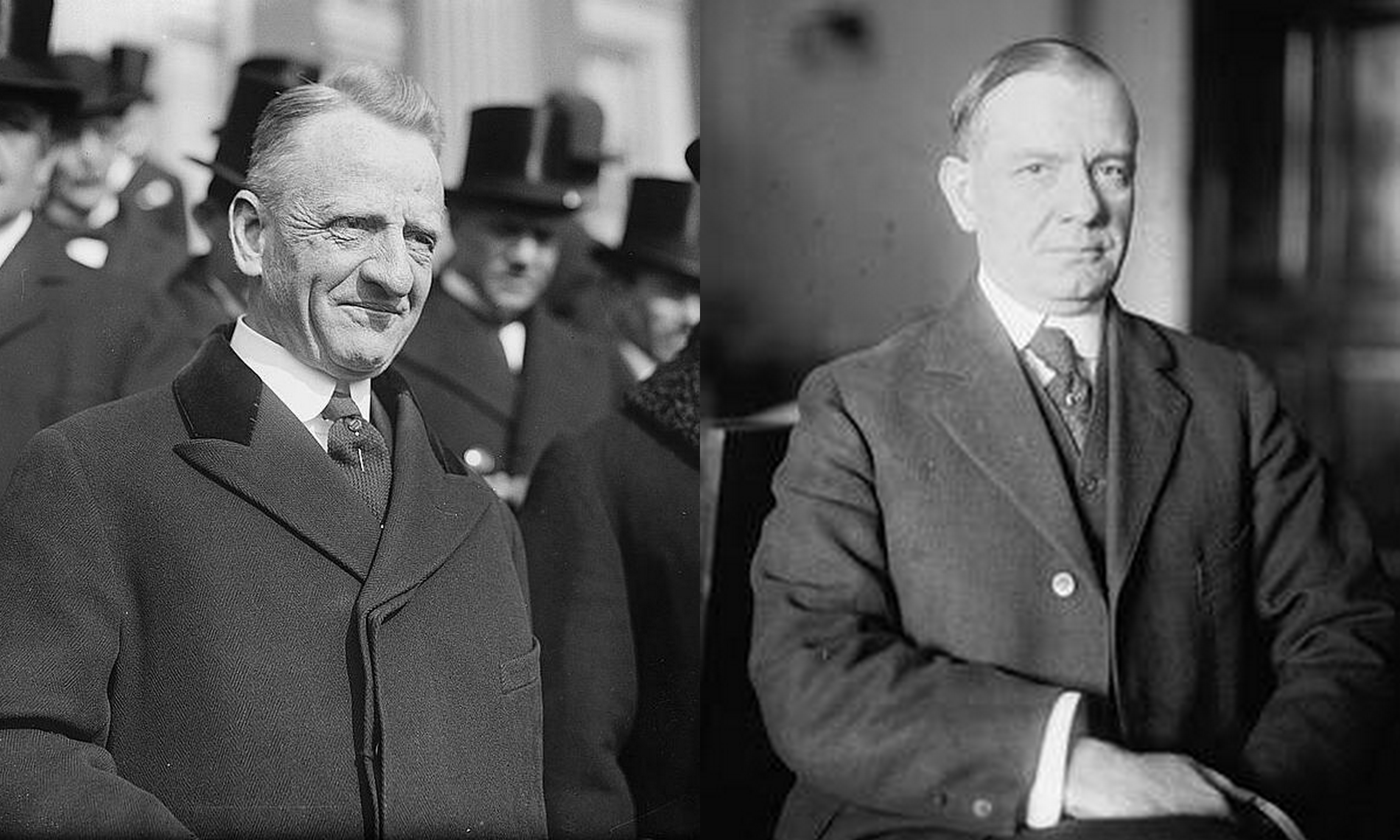
Sen. Carter Glass (D–Va.) and Rep. Henry B. Steagall (D–Ala.-3), the co-sponsors of the Glass–Steagall Act

The sponsors of both the Banking Act of 1933 and the Glass–Steagall Act of 1932 were southern Democrats: Senator Carter Glass of Virginia (who by 1932 had served in the House and the Senate, and as the secretary of the treasury); and Representative Henry B. Steagall of Alabama, who had served in the House for the preceding 17 years.

== Legislative history ==
Between 1930 and 1932, Senator Carter Glass (D-VA) introduced several versions of a bill (known in each version as the Glass bill) to regulate or prohibit the combination of commercial and investment banking and to establish other reforms (except deposit insurance) similar to the final provisions of the 1933 Banking Act. On June 16, 1933, President Roosevelt signed the bill into law. Glass originally introduced his banking reform bill in January 1932. It received extensive critiques and comments from bankers, economists, and the Federal Reserve Board. It passed the House on February 16, 1932, the Senate on February 19, 1932, and signed into law by President Hoover eight days later. The Senate passed a version of the Glass bill that would have required commercial banks to eliminate their securities affiliates.

The final Glass–Steagall provisions contained in the 1933 Banking Act reduced from five years to one year the period in which commercial banks were required to eliminate such affiliations. Although the deposit insurance provisions of the 1933 Banking Act were very controversial, and drew veto threats from President Franklin Delano Roosevelt, President Roosevelt supported the Glass–Steagall provisions separating commercial and investment banking, and Representative Steagall included those provisions in his House bill that differed from Senator Glass's Senate bill primarily in its deposit insurance provisions. Steagall insisted on protecting small banks while Glass felt that small banks were the weakness to U.S. banking.

Many accounts of the Act identify the Pecora Investigation as important in leading to the Act, particularly its Glass–Steagall provisions, becoming law. While supporters of the Glass–Steagall separation of commercial and investment banking cite the Pecora Investigation as supporting that separation, Glass–Steagall critics have argued that the evidence from the Pecora Investigation did not support the separation of commercial and investment banking.

This source states that Senator Glass proposed many versions of his bill to Congress known as the Glass Bills in the two years prior to the Glass–Steagall Act being passed. It also includes how the deposit insurance provisions of the bill were very controversial at the time, which almost led to the rejection of the bill once again.

The previous Glass Bills before the final revision all had similar goals and brought up the same objectives, which were to separate commercial from investment banking, bring more banking activities under Federal Reserve supervision, and to allow branch banking. In May 1933, Steagall's addition of allowing state-chartered banks to receive federal deposit insurance and shortening the time in which banks needed to eliminate securities affiliates to one year was known as the driving force of what helped the Glass–Steagall act to be signed into law.

== Separating commercial and investment banking ==
The Glass–Steagall separation of commercial and investment banking was in four sections of the 1933 Banking Act (sections 16, 20, 21, and 32). The Banking Act of 1935 clarified the 1933 legislation and resolved inconsistencies in it. Together, they prevented commercial Federal Reserve member banks from:

- dealing in non-governmental securities for customers
- investing in non-investment grade securities for themselves
- underwriting or distributing non-governmental securities
- affiliating (or sharing employees) with companies involved in such activities

Conversely, Glass–Steagall prevented securities firms and investment banks from taking deposits.

The Act gave institutions one year to choose between commercial and investment banking. Only 10 percent of a commercial bank's total income could come from securities, although commercial banks could underwrite government-issued bonds.

There were several "loopholes" that regulators and financial firms were able to exploit during the lifetime of Glass–Steagall restrictions. Aside from the Section 21 prohibition on securities firms taking deposits, neither savings and loans nor state-chartered banks that did not belong to the Federal Reserve System were restricted by Glass–Steagall. Glass–Steagall also did not prevent securities firms from owning such institutions. S&Ls and securities firms took advantage of these loopholes starting in the 1960s to create products and affiliated companies that chipped away at commercial banks' deposit and lending businesses.

While permitting affiliations between securities firms and companies other than Federal Reserve member banks, Glass–Steagall distinguished between what a Federal Reserve member bank could do directly and what an affiliate could do. Whereas a Federal Reserve member bank could not buy, sell, underwrite, or deal in any security except as specifically permitted by Section 16, such a bank could affiliate with a company so long as that company was not "engaged principally" in such activities. Starting in 1987, the Federal Reserve Board interpreted this to mean a member bank could affiliate with a securities firm so long as that firm was not "engaged principally" in securities activities prohibited for a bank by Section 16. By the time the GLBA repealed the Glass–Steagall affiliation restrictions, the Federal Reserve Board had interpreted this "loophole" in those restrictions to mean a banking company (Citigroup, as owner of Citibank) could acquire one of the world's largest securities firms (Salomon Smith Barney).

By defining commercial banks as banks that take in deposits and make loans and investment banks as banks that underwrite and deal with securities the Glass–Steagall act explained the separation of banks by stating that commercial banks could not deal with securities and investment banks could not own commercial banks or have close connections with them. With the exception of commercial banks being allowed to underwrite government-issued bonds, commercial banks could only have 10 percent of their income come from securities.

== Decline and repeal ==
It was not until 1933 that the separation of commercial banking and investment banking was considered controversial. There was a belief that the separation would lead to a healthier financial system. As time passed, however, the separation became so controversial that in 1935, Senator Glass himself attempted to "repeal" the prohibition on direct bank underwriting by permitting a limited amount of bank underwriting of corporate debt.

In the 1960s, the Office of the Comptroller of the Currency issued aggressive interpretations of Glass–Steagall to permit national banks to engage in certain securities activities. Although most of these interpretations were overturned by court decisions, by the late 1970s, bank regulators began issuing Glass–Steagall interpretations that were upheld by courts and that permitted banks and their affiliates to engage in an increasing variety of securities activities. Starting in the 1960s, banks and non-banks developed financial products that blurred the distinction between banking and securities products, as they increasingly competed with each other.

Separately, starting in the 1980s, Congress debated bills to repeal Glass–Steagall's affiliation provisions (Sections 20 and 32). Some believe that major U.S. financial sector firms established a favorable view of deregulation in American political circles, and in using its political influence in Congress to overturn key provisions of Glass-Steagall and to dismantle other major provisions of statutes and regulations that govern financial firms and the risks they may take. In 1999 Congress passed the Gramm–Leach–Bliley Act, also known as the Financial Services Modernization Act of 1999, to repeal them. Eight days later, President Bill Clinton signed it into law.

== Aftermath of repeal ==
After the 2008 financial crisis, some commentators argued that the repeal of Sections 20 and 32 had played an important role in leading to the United States housing bubble and 2008 financial crisis. Economics Nobel Memorial laureate Joseph Stiglitz, for instance, argued that "[w]hen repeal of Glass-Steagall brought investment and commercial banks together, the investment-bank culture came out on top", and banks which had previously been managed conservatively turned to riskier investments to increase their returns. Another laureate, Paul Krugman, contended that the repealing of the act "was indeed a mistake"; however, it was not the cause of the 2008 financial crisis.

Other commentators believed that these banking changes had no effect, and the 2008 financial crisis would have happened the same way if the regulations had still been in force. Lawrence J. White, for instance, noted that "it was not [commercial banks'] investment banking activities, such as underwriting and dealing in securities, that did them in".

== Post-financial crisis reform debate ==
Following the 2008 financial crisis, legislators unsuccessfully tried to reinstate Glass–Steagall Sections 20 and 32 as part of the Dodd–Frank Wall Street Reform and Consumer Protection Act. Both in the United States and elsewhere around the world, banking reforms have been proposed that refer to Glass–Steagall principles. These proposals include issues of "ringfencing" commercial banking operations and narrow banking proposals that would sharply reduce the permitted activities of commercial banks - institutions that provide capital liquidity to investment management firms to shore up over-inflated market valuation of securities (whether debt or equity). Reconciliation of over-committed funds is possible by filing claims to the FDIC (Federal Deposit Insurance Company) - hence further increasing the federal budget deficit.

== See also ==
- American International Group
- Arthur H. Vandenberg
- Commodity Futures Modernization Act of 2000
- Corporate law
- Decline of the Glass–Steagall Act
- Sarbanes–Oxley Act
- Subprime mortgage crisis
- Systemic risk
- Volcker rule
