= French Society of Financial Analysts =

Organization of France

The French Society of Financial Analysts (French: Société Française des Analystes Financiers (SFAF)) is the main professional organisation representing members of the French financial industry. It was created in 1961 and currently has over 1500 members, all of whom are financial professionals—financial analysts, portfolio managers, investment bankers etc. SFAF is a member of EFFAS and ACIIA.

SFAF plays a highly active role in the French financial market, advising the financial authorities and assisting listed companies in their dealings with the financial community. It has also established a code of ethics for the analyst profession in France. In 1961, the Society created a professional financial training school which is now certified to issue the Certified International Investment Analyst (CIIA) diploma.

The society publishes Revue Analyse Financière, one of Europe’s longest running financial research quarterlies, with contributions from leading academics and financial industry professionals as well as policy makers and national and international regulators.
