= Big government =

American political term

Big government is an American political term used for a government or public sector that is considered excessively large or unconstitutionally involved in certain areas of public policy or the private sector. Big government is primarily defined by its size, measured by the budget or number of employees, either in absolute terms or relative to the national economy.

The term may also be used specifically concerning government policies that attempt to regulate private or personal matters such as private sexual behavior or individual food choices – similar to the British term 'nanny state'. The term has also been used in the context of the United States to define a dominant federal government that seeks to control the authority of local institutions – an example being the overriding of state authority in favor of federal legislation.

== See also ==
- Corporate welfare
- Limited government
- Lemon socialism
- Managerial state
- Night-watchman state
- Small government
- Social engineering (political science)
- Socialism for the rich and capitalism for the poor
- Statism
- Too big to fail
- Welfare state
- Nanny state
