= Corporate debt bubble =

Mass acquisition of low-quality corporate bonds by investors in the late 2010s and 2020

The corporate debt bubble is the large increase in corporate bonds, excluding that of financial institutions, following the 2008 financial crisis. Global corporate debt rose from 84% of gross world product in 2009 to 92% in 2019, or about $72 trillion. In the world's eight largest economies—the United States, China, Japan, the United Kingdom, France, Spain, Italy, and Germany—total corporate debt was about $51 trillion in 2019, compared to $34 trillion in 2009. Excluding debt held by financial institutions—which trade debt as mortgages, student loans, and other instruments—the debt owed by non-financial companies in early March 2020 was $13 trillion worldwide, of which about $9.6 trillion was in the U.S.

The corporate bond market historically centered in the United States. The U.S. Federal Reserve noted in November 2019 that leveraged loans, corporate bonds made to companies with poor credit histories or large amounts of existing debt, were the fastest growing asset class, increasing in size by 14.6% in 2018 alone. Total U.S. corporate debt in November 2019 reached a record 47% of the entire U.S. economy. However, corporate borrowing expanded worldwide under the low interest rates of the Great Recession. Two-thirds of global growth in corporate debt occurred in developing countries, in particular China. The value of outstanding Chinese non-financial corporate bonds increased from $69 billion in 2007 to $2 trillion in 2017. In December 2019, Moody's Analytics described Chinese corporate debt as the "biggest threat" to the global economy.

Regulators and investors have raised concern that large amounts of risky corporate debt have created a critical vulnerability for financial markets, in particular mutual funds, during the next recession. Former Fed Chair Janet Yellen has warned that the large amount of corporate debt could "prolong" the next recession and cause corporate bankruptcies. The Institute of International Finance forecast that, in an economic downturn half as severe as the 2008 crisis, $19 trillion in debt would be owed by non-financial firms without the earnings to cover the interest payments, referred to as zombie firms. The McKinsey Global Institute warned in 2018 that the greatest risks would be to emerging markets such as China, India, and Brazil, where 25–30% of bonds had been issued by high-risk companies. As of March 2021, U.S. corporations faced a record $10.5 trillion in debt. On March 31, 2021, the Commercial Paper Funding Facility re-established by the Federal Reserve the previous March ceased purchasing commercial paper.

While trade in corporate bonds typically centered in the U.S., two-thirds of corporate debt growth since 2007 was in developing countries.

== Low bond yields led to purchase of riskier bonds ==
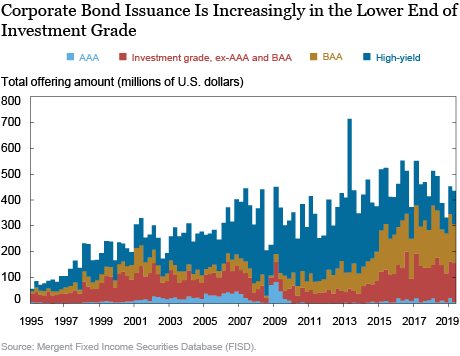
While issuance of new high-yield (junk) bonds in the US market has been declining since 2012, the issuance of BAA (the lowest rating of "investment-grade", including BBB) matched or exceeded high-yield issuance from 2016 through 2019.

Following the 2008 financial crisis, the Federal Reserve Board lowered short- and long-term interest rates in order to convince investors to move out of interest-bearing assets and match with borrowers seeking capital. The resulting market liquidity was accomplished through two steps: cutting the Fed Funds Rate (thereby influencing the rate banks charge one another for overnight loans), and quantitative easing, whereby the Fed would buy trillions of dollars of not only U.S. Treasury securities, but also toxic assets, effectively creating functioning markets for these assets and reassuring investors. The success of the U.S. Fed in dropping interest rates to historically low levels between 2009 and 2015 and thus preventing illiquid markets from worsening the financial crisis prompted central banks around the world to copy these techniques.

However, the effect of quantitative easing was not limited to the toxic mortgage bonds targeted by central banks, as it effectively reduced the supply of bonds as a class, causing prices for bonds generally to rise and bond yields to lower. For over a decade, the artificially low interest rates and artificially low bond yields, have caused a "mispricing of risk" as investors continually seek out higher yields. As an example, high-yield debt, colloquially known as "junk bonds", has historically yielded 10% or more to compensate investors for the increased risk; in February 2020, the U.S. yield on these bonds dipped to nearly 5%. This indicates that investors flocking to higher yield have bought so much high-yield debt that it has driven the yield below the level needed to compensate for the risk. U.S. corporate bonds held by mutual funds had tripled over the previous decade.

In June 2018, 22% of outstanding U.S. nonfinancial corporate debt was rated "junk", and a further 40% was rated one step above junk at "BBB", so that approximately two-thirds of all corporate debt was from companies at the highest risk of default, in particular retailers who were losing business to online services. The U.S. Fed noted in November 2019 that mutual funds held about one-sixth of outstanding corporate debt, but were acquiring one-fifth of new leveraged corporate loans. The size of high-yield corporate bond mutual funds, which specialize in riskier bonds, had doubled in the decade prior to 2019.

While trade in corporate bonds typically centered in the U.S., two-thirds of corporate debt growth since 2007 was in developing countries. China became one of the largest corporate bond markets in the world, with the value of Chinese corporate bonds increasing from $69 billion in 2007 to $2 trillion at the end of 2017. By mid-2018, total outstanding U.S. corporate debt reached 45% of GDP, which was larger than that seen during the dot-com bubble and subprime mortgage crisis. Noting negative bond yields in Switzerland, the United Kingdom, and the US in August 2019, Bloomberg News stated that effectively paying borrowers to borrow is distorting incentives and misallocating resources, concluding that bonds are on a bubble.

== Low interest rates led to increasingly leveraged companies ==
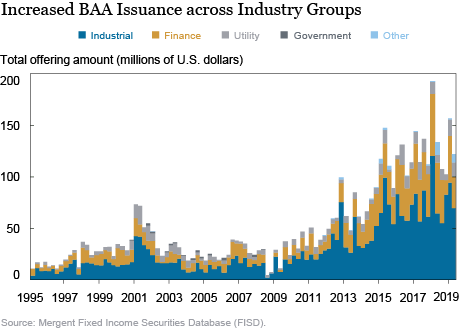
U.S. companies, in industry in particular, issued increasing amounts of bonds at the lowest tier of investment grade (known as BAA or BBB) after the 2008 financial crisis.

Companies that do not make enough profit to pay off their debts and are only able to survive by repeatedly refinancing their loans, known as "zombie firms", have been able to turn over their debt because low interest rates increase the willingness of lenders to buy higher yield corporate debt, while the yield they offer on their bonds remains at near-historical lows. In a 2018 study of 14 rich countries, the Bank of International Settlements stated that zombie firms increased from 2% of all firms in the 1980s to 12% in 2016. By March 2020, one-sixth of all publicly traded companies in the U.S. did not make enough profit to cover the interest on their issued debt. In developing countries, high-risk bonds were concentrated in particular industries. In China, one-third of bonds issued by industrial companies and 28% of those issued by real-estate companies are at a higher risk of default, defined as having a times interest earned of 1.5 or less. In Brazil, one-quarter of all corporate bonds at a higher risk of default are in the industrial sector. Fitch stated in December 2019 that the majority of Chinese companies listed on A-share markets, namely the Shanghai Stock Exchange and Shenzhen Stock Exchange, were unable to repay their debt with their operational cash flow and required refinancing.

Bond investing in Europe closely followed the actions of the European Central Bank, in particular the quantitative easing implemented in response to the European debt crisis. In June 2016, the ECB began using its corporate sector purchase programme (CSPP), acquiring 10.4 billion euro in non-financial corporate bonds in the first month of operation, with the explicit purpose of ensuring liquidity in the corporate bond market. News in mid-2019 that the ECB would restart its asset purchase program pushed the iBoxx euro corporate bond index, valued at $1.92 trillion, to record highs. The increased purchases resulted in 42% of European investment-grade corporate debt having a negative yield, as investors effectively paid less risky companies to borrow money.

The Federal Reserve Bank of New York noted in January 2020 that only two U.S. firms had the highest rating of AAA, Johnson & Johnson and Microsoft, while there was an increased number of firms at the lowest-end, called BAA (on the Moody's rating scale) or BBB (on the S&P rating scale). Investment-grade firms, those with a rating between AAA and BAA, were more highly leveraged than the high-yield ("junk") firms. Observing that investors tend to divest bonds that are downgraded to high-yield, the New York Fed stated, "In the current corporate debt landscape, with a greater amount outstanding of BAA-rated corporate debt and higher net leverage of investment-grade debt overall, the possibility of a large volume of corporate bond downgrades poses a financial stability concern."

Examples of leveraged corporate debt transactions include:

- Halliburton doubled its corporate debt to $11.5 billion between 2012 and 2020; it sold $1 billion in debt in early March 2020 with the explicit purpose of paying off existing debt and has $3.8 billion in debt payments due through 2026.
- AT&T debt ballooned to $180 billion following its acquisition of Time Warner in 2016. In 2018, Moody's declared AT&T to be "beholden to the health of the capital markets" because of its reliance on continued credit to service its debt load.
- KKR sold about $1.3 billion of cov-lite debt in 2017 to pay for its buyout of Unilever, despite Moody's rating the offer 4.99 on a scale of 1 to 5, with 5 being the riskiest.
- Kraft Heinz had its credit rating downgraded to BBB− or "junk" in February 2020 due to low earnings expectations and the firm's determination to use available capital to provide stock dividends rather than pay down debt. That month, Kraft Heinz had $22.9 billion in total debt with only $2.3 billion in cash assets.

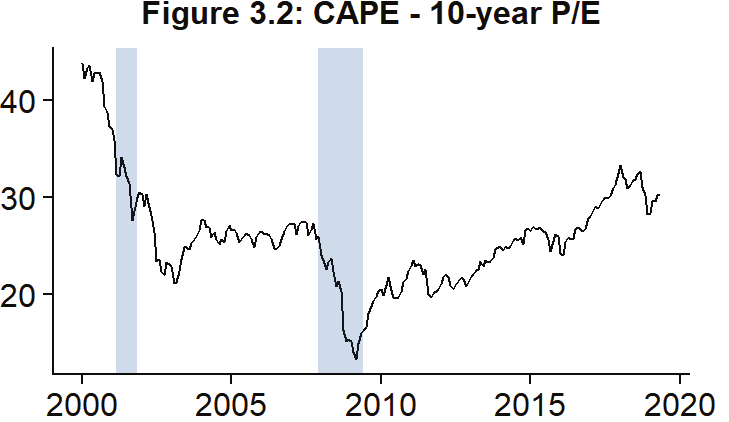
The S&P 500 cyclically adjusted price-to-earnings ratio (CAPE) suggest that the index reached an overvaluation in the late 2010s not seen since the collapse of the dot-com bubble.

Corporations in the United States have used the debt to finance share buybacks, dividends, and mergers & acquisitions that boost share price to a greater extent than before. This has been done in place of long-term business investments and expansions. The U.S. Tax Cuts and Jobs Act of December 2017 offered a tax holiday under the logic that firms would use the extra profits to increase investments. Instead, it vastly increased an existing trend towards share buybacks, which increase the value of the remaining publicly traded shares and contributed to the rise of stock market indexes generally. While the S&P 500 has risen by over 300% from its low in the Great Recession, this rise is driven partly by the selling of corporate debt to purchase stock that becomes more expensive due to the purchases. The cyclically adjusted price-to-earnings ratio for the S&P 500 indicates it is the most overvalued it has been since the dot-com bubble and is around Wall Street crash of 1929 valuations.

The McKinsey Global Institute cautioned in 2018 against excessive alarm, noting that if interest rates rose by 2%, less than 10% of bonds issued in all advanced economies would be at higher risk of default, with the percentage falling to less than 5% of European debt, which is largely issued by AAA-rated companies.

== Search for yield results in growth in covenant light bonds ==
Most leveraged corporate bonds are "cov-lite", or covenant light, that do not contain the usual protections for purchasers of the debt. In some cases, cov-lite terms may force the purchaser of the debt to buy more debt. By mid-2018, 77.4% of U.S. leveraged corporate loans were cov-lite. Cov-lite loans as a percentage of outstanding leveraged loans in European markets reached 78% in 2018, compared to under 10% in 2013. Investors seeking stronger covenants lost the struggle with companies and private equity firms seeking to offload risk to the buyers of their debt. A writer for Bloomberg News opined in February 2020, "If and when the credit cycle turns, the aggressive push toward weakening protections virtually ensures that recovery rates will be worse than in 2008. But there's no going back now: The risky debt markets are full of cov-lite deals. Investors either have to acclimate to that reality or get out of high-yield and leveraged loans."

== Chinese debt ==
The Chinese government's reaction to the 2008 financial crisis was to direct banks to loan to Chinese state-owned enterprises (SOEs), which then built factories and equipment to stimulate the economy despite the lack of demand for the products created. The economic activity of SOEs in 2017 was 22% of China's total GDP, though SOEs accounted for over half of China's corporate debt. It is often not clear the degree to which Chinese SOEs are owned by the state, making it difficult to differentiate corporate and sovereign debt. Government-directed lending gradually shifted from large banks offering loans to smaller local and provincial banks offering lightly regulated wealth management products. This "shadow banking" sector grew from $80 billion in 2006 to almost $9 trillion in 2018.

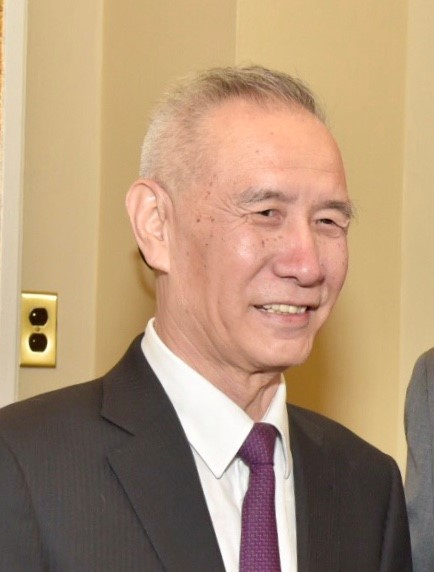
Vice-Premier Liu He is the chair of the Chinese Financial Stability and Development Committee.

In 2017, the International Monetary Fund estimated that 15.5% of all commercial bank loans in China were made to firms that did not have an operational cash flow sufficient to cover the interest on the loans. A 60% default rate of these loans could result in losses equal to 7% of Chinese GDP. In 2017, both Moody's and Standard & Poor's Financial Services LLC downgraded China's sovereign debt rating because of concerns about the health of the financial system.

The Chinese government recognized the risk posed by corporate debt. The 13th Five-Year Plan, unveiled in 2015, included financial reforms to reduce capacity in highly leveraged sectors. There were a wide variety of other policies and restrictions implemented to reduce debt burdens and manage the failure of zombie firms. In 2017, the government established the Financial Stability and Development Committee, chaired by Vice-Premier Liu He, to coordinate financial regulation, with the full impact of new regulations expected in 2021.

The China–United States trade war that began in 2018 forced the government to pause debt reduction efforts in order to emphasize stimulus as both domestic and global demand for Chinese products fell. Government attempts to crack down on risky debt combined with the economic slowdown to quadruple the size of defaults on yuan-denominated bonds from 2017 to 2018. The government subsequently encouraged banks to increase lending, in particular to small struggling firms. In the first half of 2019, local governments issued $316.5 billion in bonds. In December 2019, both Moody's Analytics and Fitch warned that Chinese debt was the biggest threat within the "fault line in the financial system and the broader economy" posed by overall corporate debt. Fitch noted that 4.9% of Chinese private companies had defaulted on bond payments in first 11 months of 2019, compared to 0.6% in all of 2014.

== Potential role of corporate debt in a future recession ==
The amount of US corporate bonds held by mutual funds tripled in the decade following the 2008 financial crisis.

The Organisation for Economic Co-operation and Development noted in February 2020 that "today’s stock of outstanding corporate bonds has lower overall credit quality, higher payback requirements, longer maturities and inferior covenant protection" that "may amplify the negative effects that an economic downturn would have on the non-financial corporate sector and the overall economy". If the corporate debt bubble bursts, the bonds would be repriced, resulting in a massive loss by the mutual funds, high-yield funds, pension funds, and endowments with corporate bond assets. As with the 2008 crisis, this may result in increased caution by lenders and the shrinking of the entire bond market, resulting in higher rates for individual consumers for mortgages, car loans, and small-business loans. The International Monetary Fund conducted a stress test for a hypothetical shock half as large as the 2008 crisis and found that $19 trillion of corporate debt from eight countries—China, the United States, Japan, the United Kingdom, France, Spain, Italy, and Germany—representing roughly 40% of all corporate debt would be at risk of default because it would be difficult for companies to raise cash to repay loans that come due.

In contrast, other observers believed that a crisis could be averted, noting that banks are better capitalized and central banks more responsive than in the 2008 financial crisis. In 2019, the McKinsey Global Institute expressed doubt that defaults in the corporate debt market would result in systemic collapses like that caused by the subprime mortgage crisis. On 12 March 2020, Kenneth Rogoff of Harvard University stated, "I don’t think we have anything shaping up like 2008 or 1929, particularly in the United States." Though he later revised as the situation worsened, stating on 30 March, "there is a good chance it will look as bad as anything over the last century and half."

=== Concern about COVID-19–related economic turmoil ===
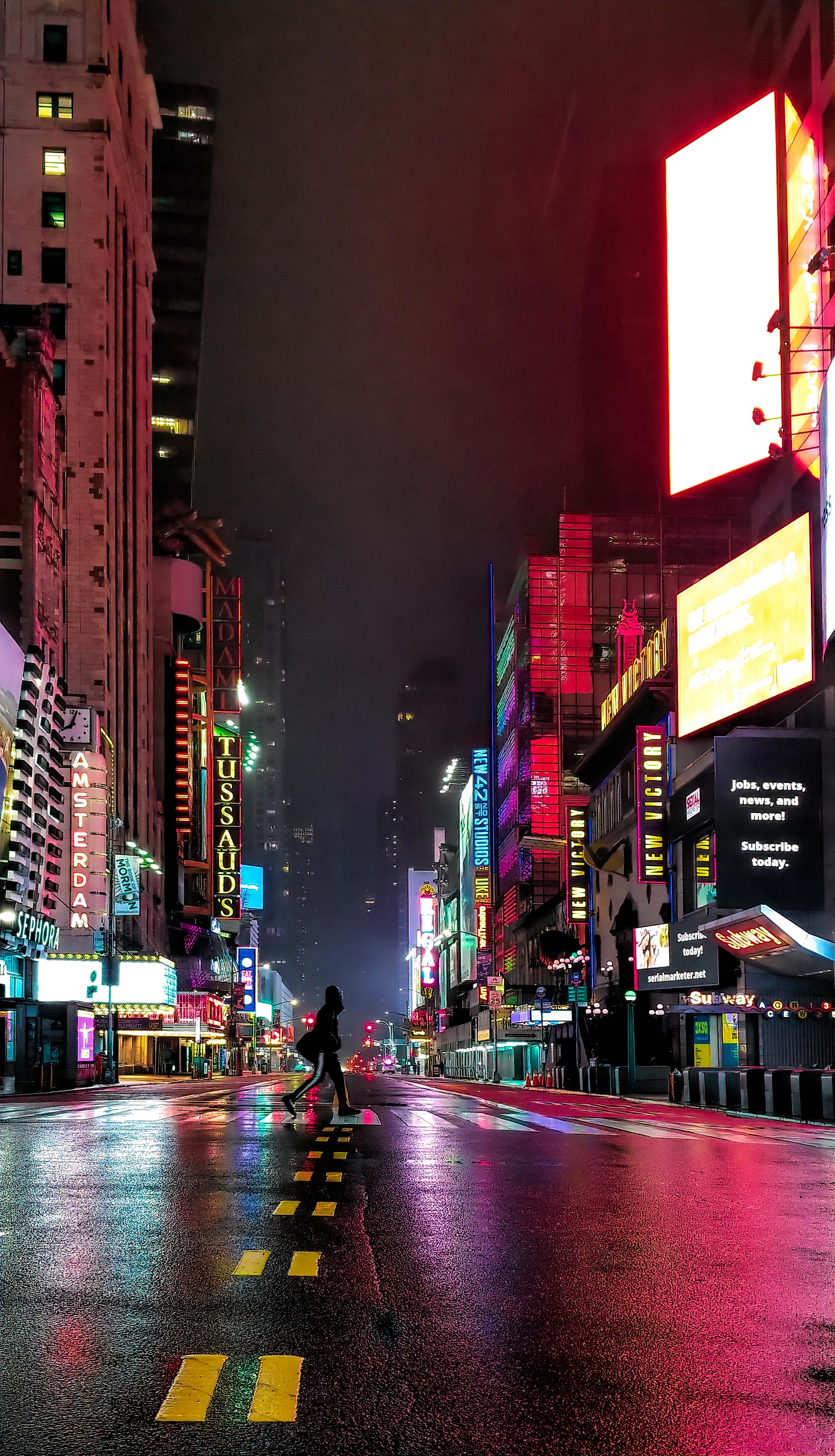
Social distancing and other responses to the COVID-19 pandemic caused drops in economic activity and corporate revenues. Pictured: New York City's Theater District largely deserted on a Saturday night in March 2020.

Several financial commentators expressed alarm at the economic fallout of the COVID-19 pandemic and related collapse of the agreement between OPEC and non-OPEC producers, particularly Russia, to prop up crude oil prices and resulting stock market crash during the week of 9 March 2020. The concern is that this economic instability may initiate the collapse of the corporate debt bubble. The total economic debt owed by non-financial companies in early March was $13 trillion worldwide, of which about $9.6 trillion was in the U.S. The Chief Investment Officer of Guggenheim Partners noted on 9 March 2020, "the overleveraged corporate sector [is] about to face the prospect that new-issue bond markets may seize up, as they did last week, and that even seemingly sound companies will find credit expensive or difficult to obtain ... Our estimate is that there is potentially as much as a trillion dollars of high-grade bonds heading to junk. That supply would swamp the high yield market as it would double the size of the below investment grade bond market. That alone would widen [yield] spreads even without the effect of increasing defaults." At end of the trading day on 9 March the yield spread for junk bonds reached 6.68% from a low of 3.49% on 6 January, as sellers attempted to lure cautious traders with higher yields. The bonds of firms in the energy sector, who make up about 10% of the total junk bond market and were particularly exposed to the Saudi-Russian oil price war, suffered large yield spreads. A debt default by energy companies would harm the regional banks of Texas and Oklahoma, potentially causing a chain reaction through the corporate bond market.

On 12 March, the spread on junk bonds over U.S. Treasuries increased to 7.42% in U.S. markets, the highest level since December 2015, indicating less willingness to buy corporate debt. As the airline and oil industries faced dire consequences from the economic slowdown and the Russia–Saudi Arabia oil price war, investors became increasingly concerned that corporate bond fund managers dealing with redemption requests from clients would be forced to engage in forced liquidation, potentially prompting other investors to try to sell first, driving down the value of the bonds, and increasing the cash crunch on investors. A concern is that companies, unable to cover their debt, will draw down their credit lines to banks, thereby reducing bank liquidity. An example is Boeing, which declared on 11 March that it would draw down the entirety of a $13.825 billion line of credit meant to cover costs related to the Boeing 737 MAX groundings to "preserve cash", resulting in an 18% drop in its stock. While U.S. banks should have capacity to supply liquidity to companies due to post-2008 crisis regulations, analysts are concerned about funds holding bonds, which were also seeking to build cash reserves in anticipation of imminent client withdrawals during the economic turmoil. In the week of 9 March, investors pulled a record $15.9 billion from investment-grade bond funds and $11.2 billion from high-yield bond funds, the second-highest on record. As of 13 March, the market was pricing in about a 50% chance of recession, indicating future strain if a recession actually came to pass.

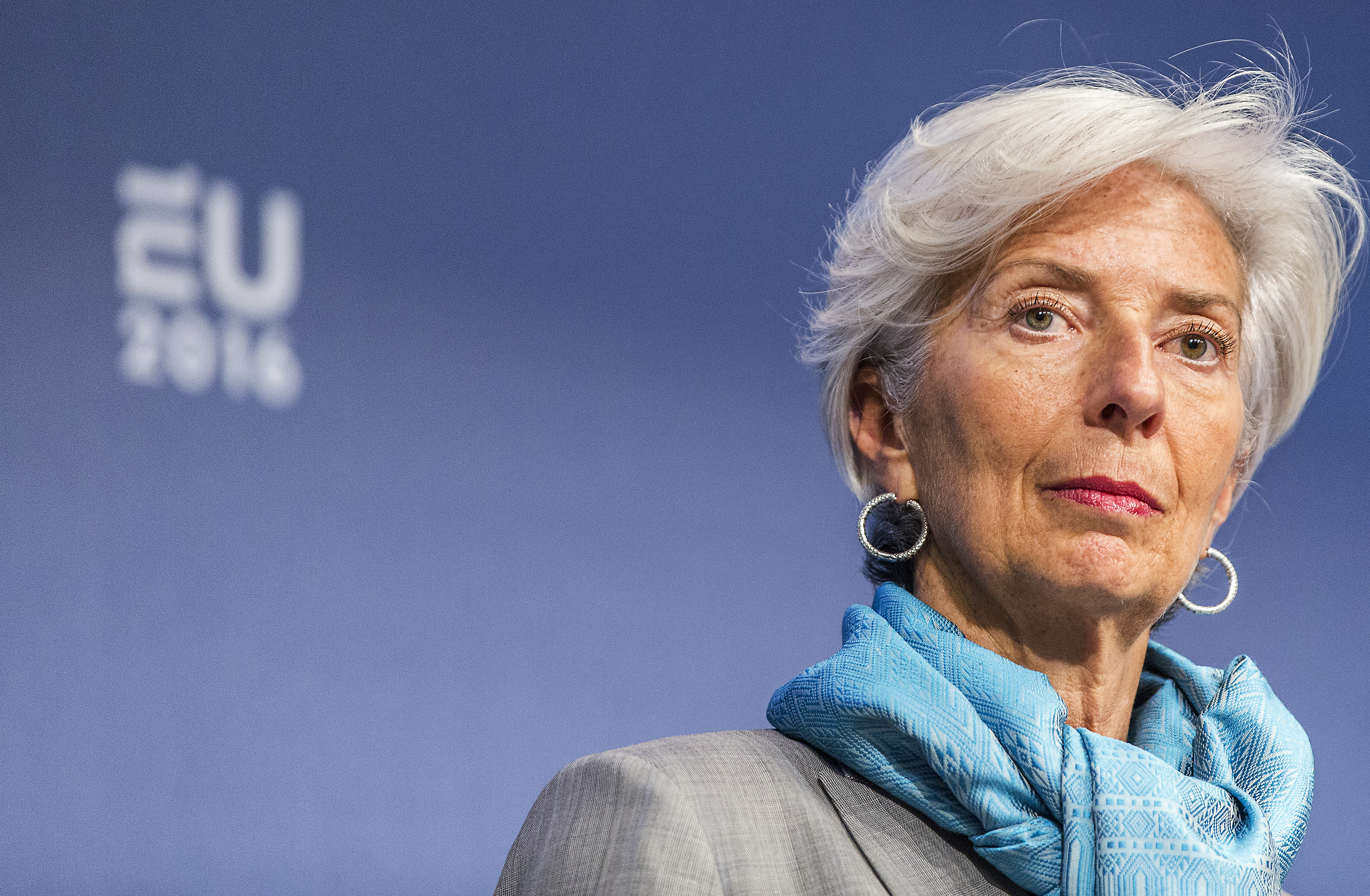
European Central Bank President Christine Lagarde oversaw the creation of a Pandemic Emergency Purchase Programme on 19 March.

From 20 February to 16 March 2020, the yield of the iBoxx euro liquid high-yield index doubled. The market for new European junk-rated corporate debt, including leveraged debt, had effectively disappeared. Around 38 billion euros of debt is due by junk-rated corporate and financial issuers in European currencies by the end of 2021. Analysts were concerned that Eurozone companies vulnerable to the COVID-19 economic downturn, and with debt coming due over the next two years, would be unable to refinance their debt and would be forced to restructure. One U.S. analyst on 16 March opined, "The longer the pandemic lasts, the greater the risk that the sharp downturn morphs into a financial crisis with zombie companies starting a chain of defaults just like subprime mortgages did in 2008." On 19 March, the European Central Bank announced a 750 billion euro ($820 billion) bond-buying program, called the Pandemic Emergency Purchase Programme, to calm European debt markets. The PEPP and corporate sector purchase programme were authorized to buy non-financial commercial paper.

==== Fed action soothe U.S. markets at the end of March ====
In the week of 23 March, investment-grade firms in the US issued $73 billion in debt, about 21% higher than the previous record set in 2013. These firms sought to build cash reserves prior to the full impact of the recession. For example, the retail-focused businesses Nike, Inc. and The Home Depot began the week borrowing $6 billion and $5 billion, respectively. Unusually, about 25% of the debt was being bought by investors who typically trade stocks. Investment-grade yields had increased as mutual fund and money-market funds sold their short-term bonds to meet client redemptions in previous weeks. The high yields and the announcement by the Fed that it would purchase investment-grade bonds to ensure market liquidity attracted hedge funds and other non-traditional buyers seeking a refuge from market volatility. The Fed's attempts to maintain corporate liquidity, including with $687 billion in support on 26 March, were primarily focused on companies with higher credit ratings. The Council on Foreign Relations opined that due to the dependence of riskier companies on commercial paper to meet short-term liabilities, there would be a large increase in corporate defaults, unless aid was extended to lower-rated borrowers.

Also on 23 March, the People's Bank of China (PBOC) began open market operations to inject liquidity for the first time since 17 February, and also lowered interest rates. Chinese firms had sold $445 billion in onshore (yuan-denominated) bonds in 2020, a 12% increase from the first quarter of 2019. This followed Chinese government efforts to increase liquidity, which drove interest rates to a 14-year low. Chinese debt yields remained stable. The amount of Chinese corporate bond defaults fell 30% in the first quarter, year on year, to less than 24 billion yuan ($3.4 billion) as banks rushed loans to stabilize businesses. While bankruptcies and job losses have been avoided in the short term, unless demand for Chinese goods and services increases, the increased loans may turn into more corporate nonperforming debt.

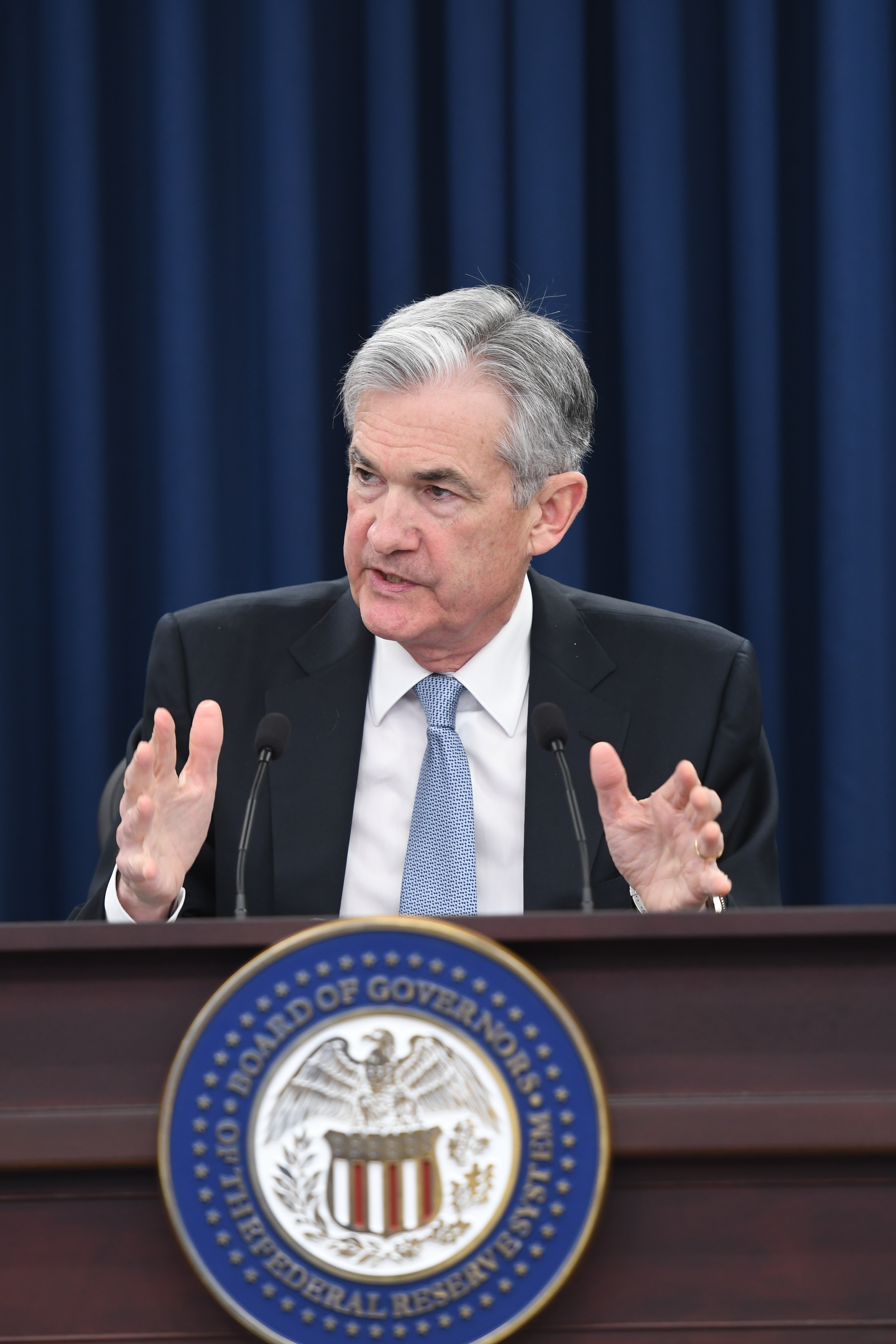
Jerome Powell, Chair of the Federal Reserve, oversaw aggressive measures to stabilize turmoil in bond markets.

On 30 March, Moody's downgraded the outlook on U.S. corporate debt from stable to negative. It mentioned in particular firms in global air travel, lodging and cruise ships, automobiles, oil and gas, and the banking sector. Moody's also noted that $169 billion in corporate debt is due in 2020, and further $300 billion in 2021, which would be difficult to roll over in the strained economic climate. At the end of March, Goldman Sachs estimated that $765 billion in U.S. corporate bonds had already experienced rating downgrades. Slippage of firms from investment-grade to junk status continued to pose a stability risk. Fitch forecasted a doubling of defaults on US leveraged loans from 3% in 2019 to 5–6% in 2020, with a default rate for retail and energy companies of up to 20%. Fitch further forecast defaults in these two markets of 8–9% in 2020, totaling $200 billion over two years.

The ability of NCR Corporation and Wynn Resorts to raise $1 billion in unsecured junk-rated debt on 7 April was seen as a sign of increased investor tolerance of risk. The previous week, Yum! Brands and Carnival Corporation were able to issue debt secured against their assets. Some investment funds began spending up to $2.5 billion acquiring loans and bonds that they viewed as becoming undervalued in the chaos of March. Also on 7 April, the Institute of International Finance identified five nation's corporate sectors with high levels of debt and limited cash that were at the most risk from COVID-19 disruption: Argentina, India, Spain, Thailand, and Turkey.

On 8 April, South Korea began won-denominated debt purchases of up to $16 billion to provide liquidity to investment-grade firms. This enabled Lotte Food Co on 9 April to issue the first won-denominated debt in three weeks. Nevertheless, yields on won-denominated corporate debt were at the highest since 2012 amid pessimism about the global economic outlook and impacts upon South Korean firms.

==== Fed extends lifeline to "fallen angels" ====
On 9 April, following passage of the U.S. Coronavirus Aid, Relief, and Economic Security Act (CARES Act), the Fed announced that it would buy up to $2.3 trillion in debt from the U.S. market. This included purchase of debt from "fallen angels", firms that were downgraded to junk after 22 March. The Fed's Primary and Secondary Market Corporate Credit Facilities totals $750 billion. They are designed as credit backstops for U.S.-listed firms rated at least BBB-/Baa3; if downgraded to junk after 22 March, the firm must be rated at least BB-/Ba3 (the highest tier of junk) when a Facility buys the debt. The Fed's announcement drove a sharp rise in prices on junk bond exchange-traded funds and individual junk-rated bonds, such as Ford Motor Company and Macy's.

Also on 9 April, ECB President Lagarde dismissed the idea of cancelling Eurozone corporate debt acquired during the COVID-19 crisis, calling it "totally unthinkable". This followed an opinion piece by former ECB President Mario Draghi arguing that national governments absorbing the cost of debt acquired by companies while economic activity was suspended would be ultimately less harmful to national economies than letting the companies default on their debt and go into restructuring.

On 16 April, Bloomberg News reported that Chinese interest rates were so low that Chinese firms were being incentivized to sell short-term debt in order to buy high-yield and less-regulated wealth management products. This arbitrage was attractive as the poor economic climate reduced incentives to invest in fixed capital and labor. However, it relies on Chinese local and provincial banks remaining solvent to be low risk.

UBS warned on 16 April that the amount of Eurozone BBB-rated debt had risen from $359 billion in 2011 to $1.24 trillion. UBS estimated a high-risk of downgrades to junk status. The average of its models indicated that about $69 billion in Euro non-financial corporate assets may be downgraded to high yield status. There are many uncertainties, but UBS predicts downgrades like that experienced in 2011–12 at the height of the European debt crisis, but not as severe as those experienced by Europe in the 2008 financial crisis.

In mid-April, traders in Asian commodity markets reported that it was increasingly difficult to obtain short-term bank letters of credit to conduct deals. Lenders reported that they were reducing exposure by refusing to lend to some smaller firms and demanding more collateral for the loans that they are making; some firms affected by COVID-19-related supply chain disruptions in the low-margin, high-volume commodity business found themselves unable to service their existing debt. One prominent Singaporean commodity firm, Agritrade International had gone bankrupt after being unable to service $1.55 billion in debt, while another, Hin Leong Trading, was struggling to manage almost $4 billion in debt. The Chief Economist of trading giant Trafigura expressed concern that the credit squeeze in Asian commodity markets would spread to the United States and Europe, stating, "We have been talking about this as a series of cascading waves. First the virus, then the economic and then potentially the credit side of it."

On 17 April, the $105 billion in debt issued by Mexican oil giant Pemex was downgraded to junk status, making it the largest company to fall from investment grade. However, its bond yields held steady as investors assumed an implicit guarantee by the Mexican government.

On 19 April, The New York Times reported that U.S. corporations had drawn more than $200 billion from existing credit lines during the COVID-19 crisis, far more than had been extended in the 2008 crisis. It noted that debt-laden firms "may be forced to choose between skipping loan payments and laying off workers". The International Association of Credit Portfolio Managers forecast that credit risk would greatly increase over the next three months.

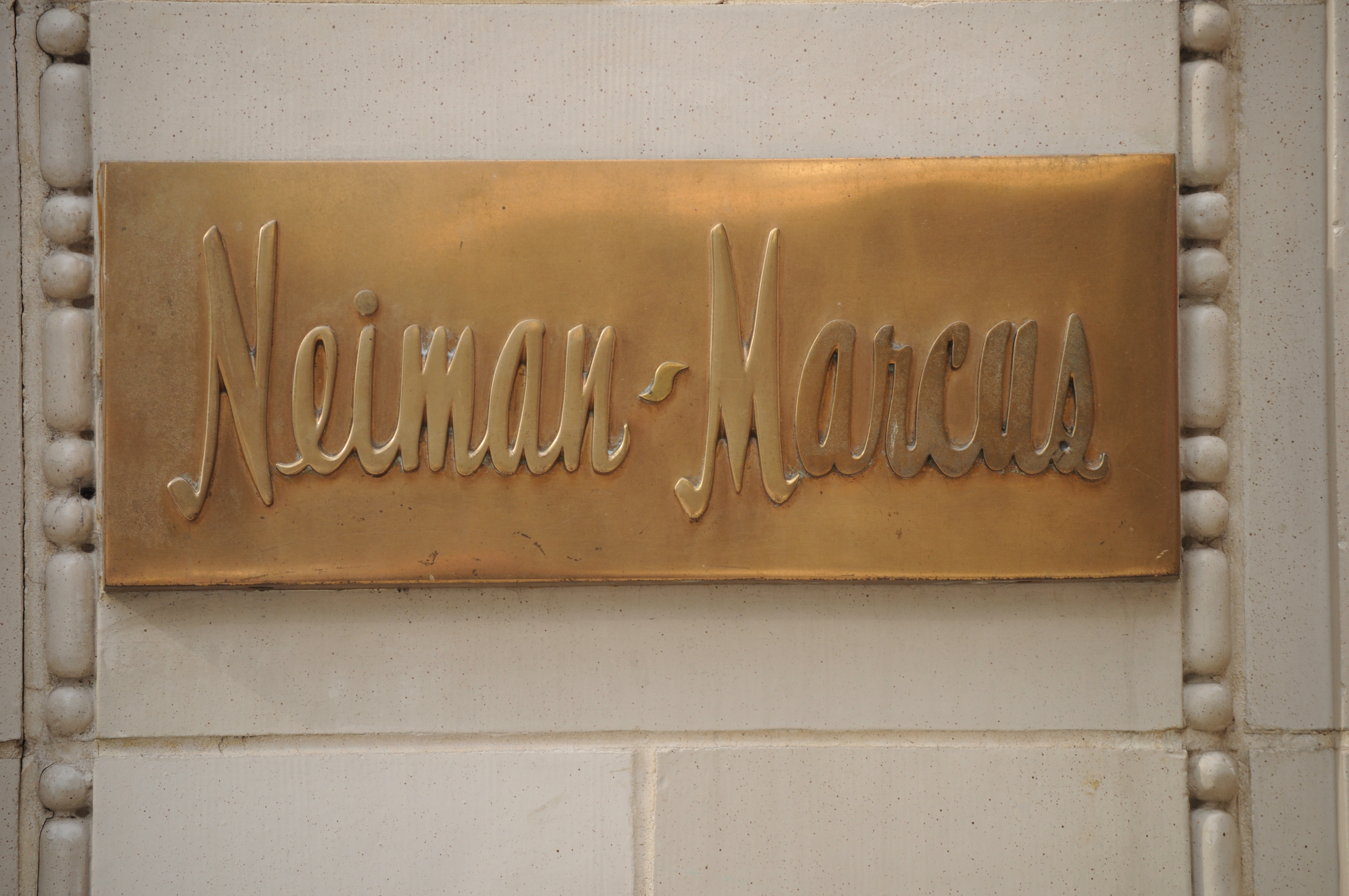
Neiman Marcus, a U.S. department store retailer, considered bankruptcy protection after failing to cover payments on debt coming due in mid-April.

Neiman Marcus missed payments on about $4.8 billion in debt and stated on 19 April that it would declare bankruptcy, in the context of the ongoing North American retail apocalypse. Ratings agencies had downgraded Neiman Marcus and J. C. Penney the previous week. J.C. Penney decided not to make a scheduled $12 million interest payment on a 2036 bond on 15 April and has a one-month grace period before creditors can demand payment.

==== Negative oil futures focused attention on the U.S. oil sector ====
On 20 April, May futures contracts for West Texas Intermediate crude oil fell to -$37.63 per barrel as uninterrupted supply met collapsing demand. Even reports that the U.S. administration was considering paying companies not to extract oil did not comfort U.S. oil companies. The head of U.S. oil services company Canary, LLC stated, "A tidal wave of bankruptcies is about to hit the sector." While oil company bonds had rallied after Fed actions earlier in the month, the collapse of oil prices undermined market confidence. Junk-rated U.S. shale oil companies comprise 12% of the benchmark iShares iBoxx $ High Yield Corporate Bond ETF, which fell 3% from 20 to 21 April. With crude prices so low, U.S. shale oil companies cannot make money pumping more oil. MarketWatch noted that now "investors are likely to focus less on the viability of a driller’s operations and how cheaply it could unearth oil. Instead, money managers would look to assess if a company’s finances were resilient enough to stay afloat during the current economic downturn." The potential failure of highly leveraged U.S. shale oil bonds may pose a risk to the high-yield market as a whole.

The airline Virgin Australia entered voluntary administration on 21 April, after being unable to manage $4.59 billion in debt. It named Deloitte as its administrator, with the intention of receiving binding offers on the entirety of the company and its operations by the end of June 2020.

On 22 April, The New York Times reported that many smaller U.S. oil companies are expected to seek bankruptcy protection in the coming months. Oil production companies have $86 billion in debt coming due between 2020 and 2024, with oil pipeline companies having an additional $123 billion due over the same period. Many U.S. oil firms were operating on Federal loans offered through the CARES Act, but those funds were already running out. The president of oil developer Texland stated, "April is going to be terrible, but May is going to be impossible."

Assets for companies in the U.S. car rental market, which were not included in the CARES Act, were under severe stress on 24 April. S&P Global Ratings had downgraded Avis and Hertz to "highly speculative", while credit default swaps for Hertz bonds indicated a 78% chance of default within 12 months and a 100% chance within five years.

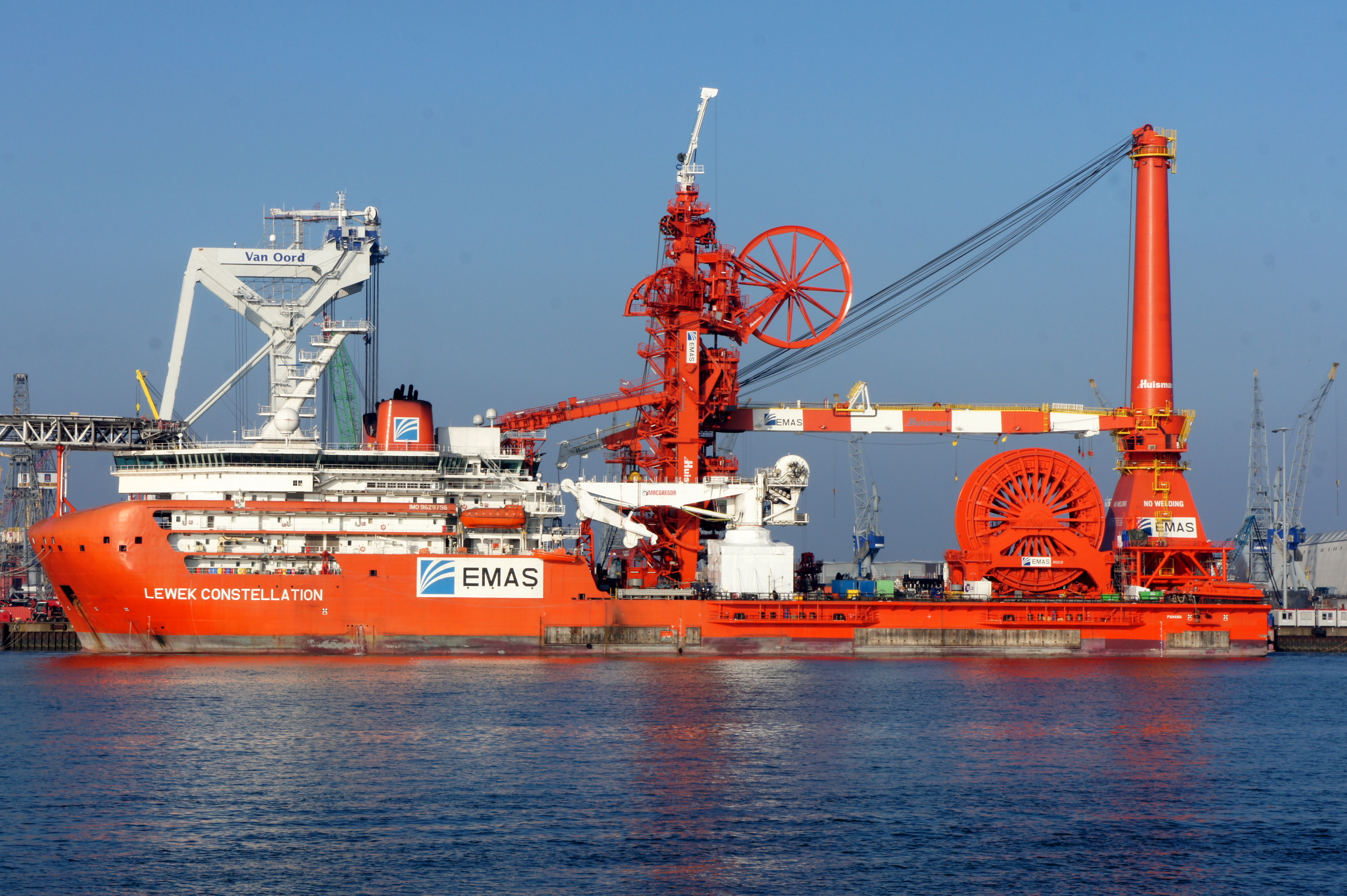
Ship owned by Singapore's Ezra Holdings, an offshore support provider for the oil and gas industry

ANZ Bank reported in late April that corporate debt in Asia was rising fastest in China, South Korea, and Singapore. Energy companies in Singapore and in South Korea, in particular, were singled out for being "over-leveraged and short on cash buffers". In China, the real estate sector was similarly over-extended. Over 60% of outstanding Singaporean corporate debt was denominated in U.S. dollars, increasing exposure to foreign exchange risk, compared to only a fifth of South Korean corporate debt. ANZ Bank, noting that most Chinese corporate debt is owned by the state and has an implicit guarantee, concluded that Chinese corporations are the least vulnerable to debt loads.

==== Record debt purchases in April ====
Between 1 January and 3 May, a record $807.1 billion of U.S. investment-grade corporate bonds were issued. Similarly, U.S. corporations sold over $300 billion in debt in April 2020, a new record. This included Boeing, which sold $25 billion in bonds, stating that it would no longer need a bailout from the U.S. government. Apple, which borrowed $8.5 billion potentially to pay back the $8 billion in debt coming due later in 2020; Starbucks, which raised $3 billion.; Ford, which sold $8 billion in junk-rated bonds despite just losing its investment rating; and cruise line operator Carnival, which increased its offering to $4 billion to meet demand. The main reasons for the lively market are the low interest rates and the Fed's actions to ensure market liquidity. The iShares iBoxx USD Investment Grade Corporate Bond, an exchange-traded fund with assets directly benefiting from Fed actions, grew by a third between March 11 and the end of April. However, companies are growing increasingly leveraged as they increase their debt while earnings fall. Through the end of April 2020, investment-grade corporate bonds gained 1.4% versus Treasury bonds' 8.9%, indicating potential investor wariness about the risk of corporate bonds. Morgan Stanley estimated 2020 U.S. investment-grade bond issuance at $1.4 trillion, around 2017's record, while Barclays estimated the non-financial corporations will need to borrow $125–175 billion in additional debt to cover the drop in earnings from the pandemic recession. Warren Buffett noted that the terms offered by the Fed were far better than those that Berkshire Hathaway could offer.

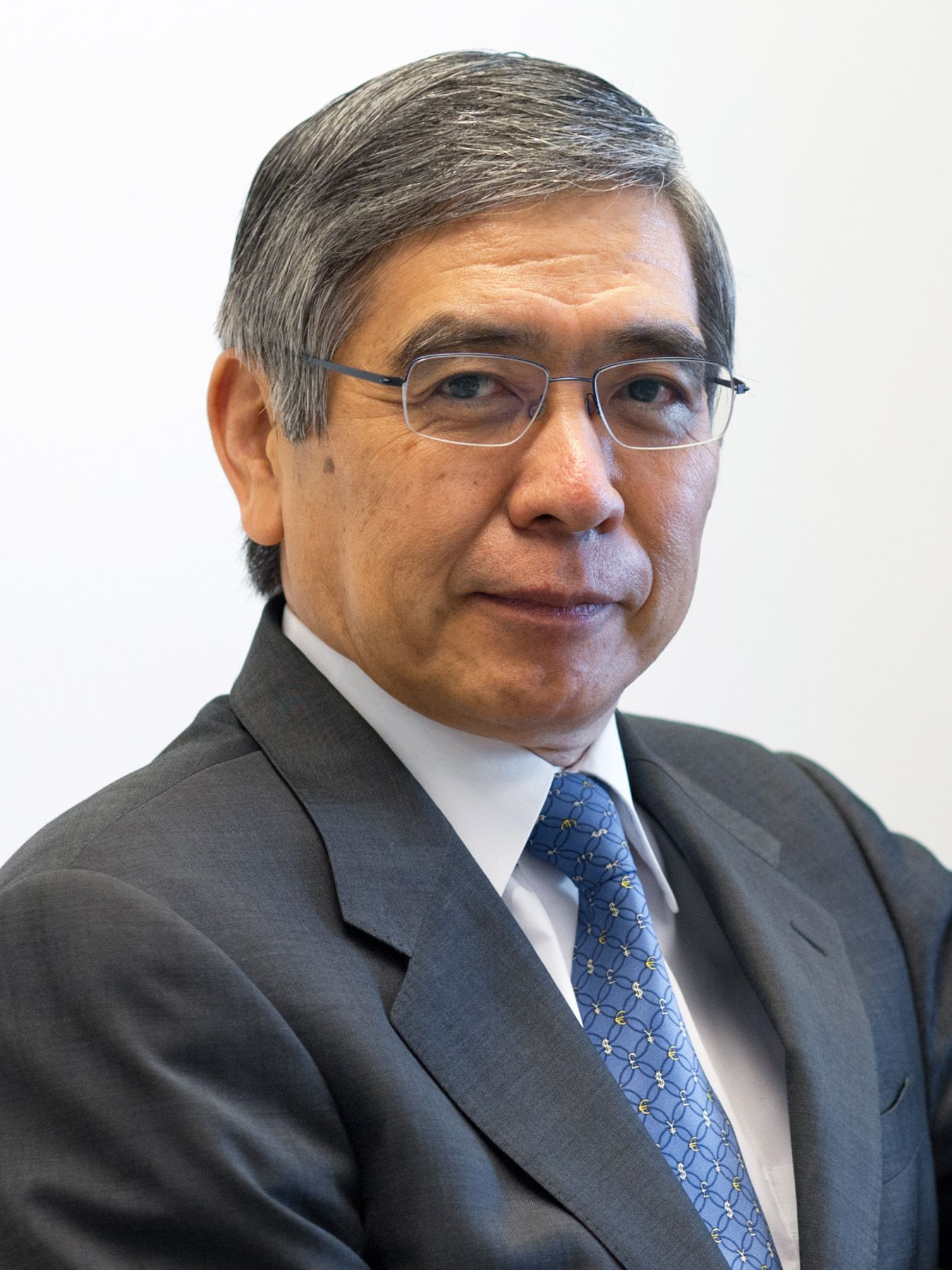
Haruhiko Kuroda, Governor of the Bank of Japan, oversaw increased buying of corporate paper and longer-term debt in March and April 2020.

The Bank of Japan increased its holdings of commercial paper by 27.8% in April 2020, which followed a rise of $16.9% in March. Efforts to alleviate strain on Japanese corporate finances also included increasing BoJ corporate bond holdings by 5.27% in April. The chief market economist at Daiwa Securities noted, "The steps the BOJ has taken so far are aimed at preventing a worsening economy from triggering a financial crisis. We'll know around late June through July whether their plan will work."

On 4 May, U.S. retailer J.Crew filed for bankruptcy protection to convert $1.6 billion in debt to equity. Its debt largely resulted from the 2011 leveraged buyout by its current owners. J.Crew became the first U.S. retailer to go bankrupt in the COVID-19 downturn.

In the week of 4 May, the Chamber of Deputies in the National Congress of Brazil was seeking to pass an amendment to the Constitution that would allow the Brazil to buy private sector securities. However, the Central Bank was concerned that bank officials could face accusations of corruption for buying assets from individual companies and were seeking personal liability protection for Central Bank purchases.

As of 6 May, the Fed had not yet utilized its Primary Market Corporate Credit and Secondary Market Corporate Credit facilities and had not explained how companies could be certified for these lending programs. However, investors had already bought debt as if the Fed backstop existed. Bank of America Global Research expressed concern that unless the Fed began actually buying debt, the uncertainty could further roil bond markets.

A group of U.S. Republican lawmakers asked President Trump to mandate that loans be provided to U.S. energy companies through the Coronavirus Aid, Relief, and Economic Security Act's Main Street Lending Program. They specifically mentioned BlackRock, which is a fiduciary to the Federal Reserve Bank of New York, and had declared in January that it was divesting itself of assets connected to power plant coal. Democratic lawmakers had previously called that oil and gas companies be barred from Main Street facility loans. More than $1.9 billion in CARES Act benefits were being claimed by oil and oil services companies, using a tax provision that allowed companies to claim losses from before the pandemic using the highest tax rate of the previous five years, even if the losses didn't happen under that tax rate. Dubbed a "stealth bailout" of the oil industry, the loss carryback provision was expected to cost at least $25 billion over 10 years.

On 9 May, Goldman Sachs warned that U.S. investors may be overestimating the Fed guarantees to junk-rated debt. Between 9 April and 4 May, the two largest junk exchange-traded funds (ETFs), the SPDR Bloomberg Barclays High Yield Bond ETF and the iShares iBoxx $ High Yield Corporate Bond ETF, respectively received $1.6 billion and $4.71 billion in net inflows. However, Goldman cautioned that even the BB-rated bonds that make up half of these two ETF's portfolios are likely to experience further downgrades. State Street Global Advisors commented on the distortions being created by the Fed's implicit guarantee: "The disconnect between the underlying fundamentals of bond issuers and bond prices is tough to reconcile."

On 12 May, the Fed began buying corporate bond ETFs for the first time in its history. It stated its intention to buy bonds directly "in the near future". As companies must prove that they can not otherwise access normal credit to be eligible for the primary market facility, analysts opined that it may create a stigma for companies and be little used. However, the guarantee of a Fed backstop appears to have ensured market liquidity.

In its annual review on 14 May, the Bank of Canada concluded that its three interest rate cuts in March and first ever bond buying program had succeeded in stabilizing Canadian markets. However, it expressed concern about the ability of the energy sector to refinance its debt given historically low oil prices. About C$17 billion in Canadian corporate bonds was sold in April 2020, one of the largest volumes since 2010.

On 15 May, J. C. Penney filed for bankruptcy. It followed the filings of Neiman Marcus and J.Crew, but was the largest U.S. retailer to file by far.

On 22 May, The Hertz Corporation filed for Chapter 11 bankruptcy. This bankruptcy allows them to continue operations as a company, while attempting to work out some form of a deal between them and their creditors.

On 5 August, Virgin Atlantic filed for bankruptcy.

On March 12, 2021, CNBC published a short video on the corporate debt/bond bubble.

== See also ==
- List of countries by corporate debt
- The Age of Debt Bubbles
