= Zombie company =

Company with a net worth below zero

In political economy, a zombie company is a company that needs bailouts in order to operate, or an indebted company that is able to repay the interest on its debts but not repay the principal.

== Description ==
Zombie companies are indebted businesses that, although generating cash, after covering running costs, and fixed costs (wages, rates, rent) only have enough funds to service the interest on their loans, but not the debt itself. As such, they are generally dependent on the refinancing of maturing debt for their continued existence and may face solvency risks should interest rates rise or investors withdraw from further financing.

== History ==
The term "zombie company" was applied to Japanese firms supported by Japanese banks during the period known as the "Lost Decade" after the collapse of the Japanese asset price bubble in c.1990. Japanese banks continued to support weak or failing firms. The retailer Daiei is an example of a large company that expanded greatly during the period leading to the 1990 crash, and under different circumstances would have been expected to have entered receivership or bankruptcy. The finance minister, Takeo Hiranuma, was reported as describing the 96,000-employee firm as being 'too big to fail'.

The term zombie company returned to the economic professional discourse towards the end of the decade (2010 onwards) following the situation of 0 interest rate (i.e., Zero Lower Bound - ZLB) in the western countries.

By 2016, following the economic downturn in China (see also 2015–16 Chinese stock market crash), Chinese industrial companies (steel, aluminum, paper, etc.) had developed gross overproduction capacity problems, with overcapacity rising from 0% in 2007 to an average of 13% by 2015, with figures higher than 30% in some industries (cement, steel in 2014). At the 2016 National People's Congress, the country's government recognized the issue of the 'Zombie Enterprises' and announced that it was to close or reorganize many state-owned (public) industrial companies by 2020. In the coal and steel industries, the resultant loss of work was expected to result in 1.8 million redundancies (15% of the workforce), with total redundancies estimated to be up to 6 million workers.

The term saw an increased amount of usage in 2022, with concern over a number of zombie companies in the United States possibly going bankrupt or needing to layoff workers due to a spike in interest rates.

== See also ==
- Corporate welfare
- Zombie bank, related term referring to bank businesses with similar financial issues
- Lemon socialism, term referring to state support of weak or failing businesses
- Crony capitalism
- Too big to fail
- Too connected to fail
- Vulture fund
- Corporate debt bubble
