= Socialism for the rich and capitalism for the poor =

Political-economic argument

- Original form: Socialism and communism in the interest of the rich
- Meaning: Criticism on corporate welfare and, by extension, economic inequality

"Socialism for the rich and capitalism for the poor" is a political-economic argument asserting that, in advanced capitalist societies, state policies assure that more resources flow to the rich than to the poor, for example in the form of a bailout.

The term corporate welfare is widely used to describe the bestowal of favorable treatment to big business (particularly corporations) by the government. One of the most commonly raised forms of criticism are statements that the capitalist political economy toward large corporations allows them to benefit from government interventions ("lemon socialism"). The argument has been raised and cited on many occasions.

Variations of the concept include "privatize profits and socialize risks" (or "privatize gains and socialize risks") as well as "free markets for the poor while state protection for the rich".

== History and usage ==
In his 1891 work, A Perplexed Philosopher, the economist Henry George accused the philosopher Herbert Spencer of supporting "what is essentially socialism and communism in the interest of the rich." The phrase may have been popularized by Michael Harrington in his 1962 book, The Other America, in which he cites Charles Abrams, a well-known authority on housing.

Andrew Young has been cited for calling the United States system "socialism for the rich and free enterprise for the poor," and Martin Luther King Jr. frequently used this wording in his speeches. Since at least 1969, Gore Vidal widely disseminated the expression "free enterprise for the poor and socialism for the rich" to describe the U.S. economic policies, notably using it from the 1980s in his critiques of Reaganomics.

In winter 2006/2007, in response to criticism about oil imports from Venezuela, that country being under the leadership of Hugo Chávez, the founder and president of Boston's Citizens Energy Corporation, Joseph P. Kennedy II, countered with a critique of the U.S. system which he characterized as "a kind of socialism for the rich and free enterprise for the poor that leaves the most vulnerable out in the cold." Robert F. Kennedy Jr. has also expressed to large audiences that the United States is now a land of "socialism for the rich and brutal capitalism for the poor."

Linguist and political scientist Noam Chomsky has criticized the way in which free market principles have been applied. He has argued that the wealthy use free-market rhetoric to justify imposing greater economic risk upon the lower classes, while being insulated from the rigours of the market by the political and economic advantages that such wealth affords. He remarked, "the free market is socialism for the rich—[free] markets for the poor and state protection for the rich." He has stated that the rich and powerful "want to be able to run the nanny state" so that "when they are in trouble the taxpayer will bail them out," citing "too big to fail" as an example.

Economist Ha-Joon Chang broadens the concept to encompass self-serving macroeconomic policies of the West that disadvantage the developing world, as Keynesianism for the rich and monetarism for the poor.

Arguments along a similar line were raised in connection with the financial turmoil in 2008. Concerning the federal takeover of Fannie Mae and Freddie Mac, Ron Blackwell, chief economist of AFL–CIO, used the expression "Socialism for the rich and capitalism for the poor" to characterize the system. In September 2008, U.S. Senator Bernie Sanders said regarding the bailout of the U.S. financial system: "This is the most extreme example that I can recall of socialism for the rich and free enterprise for the poor." Senator Sanders also referenced the phrase during his 8 1/2-hour speech on the Senate floor on December 10, 2010, against the continuation of Bush-era tax cuts, when speaking on the federal bailout of major financial institutions at a time when small-businesses were being denied loans.

Former U.S. Secretary of Labor Robert Reich adapted this phrase on The Daily Show with Jon Stewart on October 16, 2008: "We have socialism for the rich, and capitalism for everyone else." Comedian Jon Stewart later characterized this in a debate with Bill O'Reilly by asking, "Why is it that if you take advantage of a tax break and you're a corporation, you're a smart businessman—but if you take advantage of something that you need to not be hungry, you're a moocher?"

The late journalist John Pilger included the phrase in his speech accepting Australia's human rights award, the Sydney Peace Prize, on November 5, 2009:

Democracy has become a business plan, with a bottom line for every human activity, every dream, every decency, every hope. The main parliamentary parties are now devoted to the same economic policies – socialism for the rich, capitalism for the poor – and the same foreign policy of servility to endless war. This is not democracy. It is to politics what McDonald's is to food.

In 2022, economist Yanis Varoufakis offered a similar version of this phrase in his critique of the response of governments and central banks to the 2008 financial crisis and the 2021–2022 inflation surge, describing these measures as "nothing short of lavish socialism for capital and harsh austerity for labor."

In 2023, Robert F. Kennedy Jr. used a variation of this phrase on Tucker Carlson Tonight, saying that in the contemporary United States, "there's a cushy socialism for the rich and this kind of brutal, merciless capitalism for the poor."

== See also ==
- Brown–Kaufman amendment
- CC–PP game
- Concentrated benefits and diffuse costs
- Crony capitalism
- Economic interventionism
- Inverted totalitarianism
- Iron triangle (US politics)
- Late capitalism
- Market fundamentalism
- Neo-feudalism
- Neopatrimonialism
- Plutocracy
- Regulatory capture
- The rich get richer and the poor get poorer
- Too big to fail
- Trickle-down economics
