= Statism =

Doctrine that the political authority of the state is legitimate to some degree

In political science, statism or etatism (from French, état 'state') is the doctrine that the political authority of the state is legitimate to some degree. This may include economic and social policy, especially in regard to taxation and the means of production.

While in use since the 1850s, the term statism gained significant usage in American political discourse throughout the 1930s and 1940s. Opposition to statism is termed anti-statism or anarchism. The latter is usually characterized by a complete rejection of all hierarchical rulership.

== Overview ==
Statism can take many forms, from small state to strong state. Minarchism is a political philosophy that prefers a minimal state such as a night-watchman state to protect people from aggression, theft, breach of contract and fraud with the military, police and courts. This may also include fire departments, prisons and other functions. The welfare state is another form within the spectrum of statism. Authoritarian philosophies view a strong, authoritative state as required to legislate or enforce morality and cultural practices. Totalitarianism is that which prefers a maximum, all-encompassing state.

Political theory has long questioned the nature and rights of the state. Some forms of corporatism extol the moral position that the corporate group, usually the state, is greater than the sum of its parts and that individuals have a moral obligation to serve the state. Skepticism towards statism in Western cultures is largely rooted in Enlightenment philosophy. John Locke notably influenced modern thinking in his writings published before and after the English Revolution of 1688, especially A Letter Concerning Toleration (1667), Two Treatises of Government (1689) and An Essay Concerning Human Understanding (1690). In the text of 1689, he established the basis of liberal political theory, i.e., that people's rights existed before government; that the purpose of government is to protect personal and property rights; that people may dissolve governments that do not do so; and that representative government is the best form to protect rights.

== Economic statism ==
Economic statism promotes the view that the state has a major, necessary and legitimate role in directing the major aspects of the economy, either directly through state-owned enterprises and economic planning of production, or indirectly through economic interventionism and macro-economic regulation.

=== State capitalism ===
State capitalism is a form of capitalism that features high concentrations of state-owned commercial enterprises or state direction of an economy based on the accumulation of capital, wage labor and market allocation. In some cases, state capitalism refers to economic policies such as dirigisme, which existed in France during the second half of the 20th century and to the present-day economies of the People's Republic of China and Singapore, where the government owns controlling shares in publicly traded companies. Some authors also define the former economies of the Eastern Bloc and Soviet Union as constituting a form of state capitalism.

=== State corporatism ===
State corporatism, corporate statism or simply "corporatism" is a political culture and a form of corporatism whose proposers affirm or believe that corporate groups should form the basis of society and the state. This principle requires that all citizens belong to one of the various officially designated interest groups (usually on the basis of the economic sector), the state also has great control over its citizens.

=== State interventionism ===
The term statism is sometimes used to refer to market economies with large amounts of government intervention, regulation or influence over markets. Market economies that feature high degrees of intervention are sometimes referred to as "mixed economies". Economic interventionism asserts that the state has a legitimate or necessary role within the framework of a capitalist economy by intervening in markets, regulating against overreaches of private sector industry and either providing or subsidizing goods and services not adequately produced by the market.

=== State socialism ===
State socialism broadly refers to forms of socialism based on state ownership of the means of production and state-directed allocation of resources. It is often used in reference to Soviet-type economic systems of former communist states and, by extension, those of North Korea, Cuba, and the People's Republic of China. Politically, state socialism is often used to designate any socialist political ideology or movement that advocates for the use of state power for the construction of socialism, or to the belief that the state must be appropriated and used to ensure the success of a socialist revolution. It is usually used in reference to Marxist–Leninist socialists who champion a one-party state. Critics of state socialism argue that its known manifestations in Soviet-model states are merely forms of state capitalism, claiming that the Soviet model of economics was based upon a process of state-directed capital accumulation and social hierarchy.

== Political statism ==
=== State nationalism ===
State nationalism, state-based nationalism, state-led nationalism, or "statism" (Chinese: 國家主義) equates 'state identity' with 'national identity' and values state authority. State nationalism is classified as civic nationalism by the dichotomy that divides nationalism into "civic" and "ethnic", but it is not necessarily liberal and has been present in authoritarian politics. Soviet nationalism, Kokkashugi, Kemalism, Francoism, and Communist-led Chinese state nationalism are all classified as state nationalism.

=== State feminism ===
State feminism is a feminism permitted by the state or led by the nation state. State feminism is distinguished between liberal state feminism (represented by the Nordic model) and authoritarian state feminism (that is often also linked to state-led secularism).

== See also ==
- Anarchism and libertarianism
- Anarcho-capitalism
- Anti-statism
- Autocracy
- Big government and small government
- Fascism
- Federalism
- Imperialism
- Monopoly on violence
- Night-watchman state
- Oligarchy
- Stateless society
- Sovereignty
- Subsidiarity
