= Edward Kane =

American economist and writer

Edward J. Kane (June 30, 1935 – March 2, 2023) was an American economist and writer. He was a long-time student of incentive conflict in financial regulation and in crisis-management policies. His writing contends that too-big-to-fail policies are rooted in the cultural norms of major central banks around the world.

== Early life and family ==
Kane was born in Washington, D.C., on June 30, 1935, and died in Tucson, AZ on March 2, 2023. He received a B.S. from Georgetown University and a Ph.D. from the Massachusetts Institute of Technology, where he studied under Evsey Domar, Charles Kindleberger, Paul Samuelson and Robert Solow. In August 1959, he married Gloria Verdi, who died in 2012. They have three children,: Laura Kane, Stephen Kane and Edward F. Kane.

== Career ==
He served as the first James F. Cleary Professor in Finance at Boston College from 1992 to 2009, where he continued to serve as research professor until his death. From 1972 to 1992 he held the Everett D. Reese Chair of Banking and Monetary Economics at the Ohio State University. Before that, he was an assistant professor at Iowa State and Princeton Universities and had been a professor of economics at Boston College.

Kane is a past president of three professional associations: the American Finance Association, the International Atlantic Economic Society, and the North American Economics and Finance Association. He was a founding member of the Shadow Financial Regulatory Committee and served for 12 years as a trustee and member of the finance committee of Teachers Insurance Annuity Association. For many years, he was a consultant for the World Bank and a senior fellow in the Federal Deposit Insurance Corporation's Center for Financial Research. He has been a research associate of the National Bureau of Economic Research for over 30 years. Over his career, Kane consulted for numerous organizations including the International Monetary Fund|IMF], various components of the Federal Reserve System, the Joint Economic Committee, the Congressional Budget office, and the Office of Technology Assessment of the U.S. Congress and several foreign central banks.

Widely published in professional journals, he is the author of three books and credited with coining the term Zombie Bank. He served on five Editorial boards at the time of his death.

== Books ==
The S & L Insurance Mess: How Did it Happen? published by the Urban Institute Press in 1989.

In the late 1980s, the United States experienced its first banking crisis in over 50 years. This book shows that, for many years, unbooked losses were allowed to accumulate at commercial banks, savings banks, and savings and loan associations (S&Ls). This book analyzes the cause and estimates the costs of the impending failures. These costs exceeded the resources of the two federal deposit-insurance funds. The author predicted that these excess losses would be charged to U.S. taxpayers rather than depositors.

The Gathering Crisis in Federal Deposit Insurance, which was published in 1985.

This is a comprehensive discussion of FDIC and FSLIC policies and procedures. The book warned bankers, regulators, politicians, and taxpayers that the deposit-insurance system was headed for a breakdown. It argues that unless better regulatory discipline was introduced, the problem would grow. Eventually, a series of depositor runs would reveal widespread insolvency among financial institutions. The Gathering Crisis in Federal Deposit Insurance provides describes the variety of risks facing deposit institutions, explains the risk-bearing incentives in the current deposit-insurance arrangements, documents the extent of actual insolvency at insured institutions, and proposes a framework for reform.

Economic Statistics and Econometrics: An Introduction to Quantitative Economics originally published in 1968.

Economic statistics and econometrics are branches of applied statistics. They develop and validate procedures that guide the collection and analysis of economic data. The study of these fields seeks to explain how empirical data can be turned into meaningful information households, businesses, and governments need to make optimal decisions in their economic and policy affairs.

== Paper ==
“Ethical Conflicts in Managing the S&L Insurance Mess”

“Tracking Variation in Systemic Risk at US Banks During 1974-2013” (with Armen Hovakimian and Luc Laeven)

“Deposit Insurance Around the World: A Comprehensive Analysis and Database” (with Aslı Demirgüç-Kunt and Luc Laeven)

“How is Jamie Dimon Like a Smoker on an Airplane?” Huffington Post (6/18/15)

“Perspectives on Banking and Banking Crises”

“Unpacking and Reorienting the Executive Subcultures of Megabanks and their Regulators”

“Confronting Divergent Interests in Cross-Country Regulatory Arrangements,” (2006) Reserve Bank of New Zealand: Bulletin, Vol. 69, No. 2.

Statement on Banking and Banking Regulation (Joint Committee of Inquiry into the Banking Crisis, Linster House, Dublin, Ireland).

“Please Don’t Throw Me in the Briar Patch: The Flummery of Capital-Requirement Repairs Undertaken in Response to the Great Financial Crisis”

“Insurance Contracts and Derivatives that Substitute for them: How and Where Should their Systemic and Nonperformance Risks be Regulated?”

“Globalization of the US Financial Safety Net”

“Hair of the Dog that Bit Us: The Insufficiency of New and Improved Capital Requirements”

“Gaps and Wishful Thinking in the Theory and Practice of Central-Bank Policymaking,” in Morten Balling, Ernest Gnan and Patricia Jackson (eds.), States, Banks, and the Financing of the Economy: Monetary Policy and Regulatory Perspectives, SUERF Studies, 2013/3.

“Shadowy Banking”

"Regulation and Supervision: An Ethical Perspective" in A. Berger, P. Molyneux, and J. Wilson (ed.) Oxford Handbook on Banking, London: Oxford University Press (2nd Edition, 2015).

“Valuing the Conjectural Government Guarantees of FNMA Liabilities,” (with C. Foster) in Proceedings of Conference on Bank Structure and Competition, Chicago: Federal Reserve Bank of Chicago, 1986, pp. 347–368.

“Bankers and Brokers First: Loose Ends in the Theory of Central-Bank Policymaking”

“Variation in Systemic Risk at US Banks during 1974-2010,” (with Armen Hovakimian and Luc Laeven)

“The 2007 Meltdown in Structured Securitization: Searching for Lessons not Scapegoats,” (with Gerard Caprio Jr. and Aslı Demirgüç-Kunt), World Bank Research Observer, 25, February 2010.

“Safety-Net Losses from Abandoning Glass-Steagall Restrictions,” (with Kenneth A. Carow and Rajesh P. Narayanan), Journal of Money, Credit and Banking, 43 (October 2011), 1371–1398.

“Safety-Net Benefits Conferred on Difficult-to-Fail-and-Unwind Banks in the US and EU Before and During the Great Recession,” (with Santiago Carbo-Valverde and Francisco Rodriguez-Fernandez)

“How to Reform the Credit-Rating Process to Support a Revival of Private-Label Securitization,” (with Richard Herring), Quarterly Journal of Finance, 2(2012).

“Missing Elements in US Financial Reform: A Kübler-Ross interpretation of the inadequacy of the Dodd-Frank Act,” Journal of Banking and Finance, 36 (March 2012).

"Regulatory Arbitrage in Cross-Border Mergers of Banks in the EU", (with Santiago Carbo-Valverde and Francisco Rodriguez-Fernandez), Journal of Money, Credit and Banking, 44 (December, 2012).

"Unmet Duties in Managing Financial Safety Nets" Business Ethics Quarterly, 2, March 2011.

“Redefining and Controlling Systemic Risk” Atlantic Economic Journal, 38, June 2010.

"The Importance of Monitoring and Mitigating the Safety-Net Consequences of Regulation Induced Innovation" Review of Social Economy, 58, June 2010.

"Extracting Nontransparent Safety Net Subsidies By Strategically Expanding and Contracting a Financial Institution’s Accounting Balance Sheet" Journal of Financial Services Research, 35 (December 2009)

"What Lessons Should Japan Learn from the U.S. Deposit Insurance Mess?," Journal of the Japanese and International Economies, 7, 329-355 (1993).

"Incentive Roots of the Securitization Crisis and its Early Mismanagement," Yale Journal on Regulation, Summer 2009.

"Evidence of Improved Monitoring and Insolvency Resolution after FDICIA"

"Ethical Failures in Regulating and Surpervising the Pursuit of Safety-Net Subsidies" European Business Organization Law Review, 10 (2009), 185–211.

"Who Should Bear Responsibility for Mistakes Made in Assigning Credit Ratings to Securitized Debt?"

"Incentive Conflict in Central-Bank Responses to Sectoral Turmoil in Financial Hub Countries" in 2009 volume being edited by Douglas Evanoff of the Federal Reserve Bank of Chicago.

"Basel II: A Contracting Perspective," Journal of Financial Services Research, 32, 39–53.

"Connecting National Safety Nets: The Dialectics of Basel II Contracting Process," Atlantic Economic Journal, 35, 399-409.

"Inadequacy of Nation-Based and VaR-Based Safety Nets in the European Union," The North American Journal of Economics and Finance, 17, 375–387.

"Confronting Divergent Interests in Cross-Country Regulatory Arrangements" (chapter in Guidelines for Cross-Border Banking Proceedings, December 2005.

"Can the European Community Afford to Neglect the Need for More Accountable Safety-Net Management?" Atlantic Economic Journal, 34, 127–144.

"Impediments to Fair and Efficient Resolution of Insolvencies in Large Banks and Banking Crises," in Douglas Evanoff and George Kaufman (ed.), Systemic Financial Crises: Resolving large Bank Insolvencies, Singapore: World Scientific, 2005.

"Determinants of Deposit-Insurance Adoption and Design" (With Asli Demirguc-Kunt and Luc Laeven), Journal of Financial Intermediation, 17 (July 2008), pp. 407–38.

"Charles Kindleberger: An Impressionist in a Minimalist World," Atlantic Economic Journal, 33, 35–42.

"How Have Borrowers Fared in Banking Mega-Mergers?" (With Kenneth A. Carow and Rajesh Narayanan), Journal of Money, Credit and Banking, 38, 821–836.

"The Role of Watchdog Institutions in Corporate Governance"

"Financial Regulation and Bank Safety Nets: An International Comparison"

“Alternatives to Blanket Guarantees for Containing a Systemic Crisis,” (with Daniela Klingebiel), Journal of Financial Stability, 1, 31–63.

"Continuing Dangers of Disinformation in Corporate Accounting Reports," Review of Financial Economics, 13, 149–164.

"How Country and Safety-Net Characteristics Affect Bank Risk-Shifting," (with Armen Hovakimian and Luc Laeven) Journal of Financial Services Research, 2003.

“What Kind of Multinational Deposit-Insurance Arrangements Might Best Enhance World Welfare?” Pacific Basin Finance Journal, 2003.

“What Lessons Might Crisis Countries in Asia and Latin America Have Learned from the S&L Mess?,” Business Economics, 38 (January 2003), pp. 21–30.

"Regression Evidence of Safety-Net Support in Canada and the U.S., 1893-1992" (with Barry Wilson), The Quarterly Review of Economics and Finance, 42 (2002), 649–671.

“Using Deferred Compensation to Strengthen the Ethics of Financial Regulation," Journal of Banking and Finance, 26 (September, 2002) 1919–33.

"Deposit Insurance Around the Globe: Where Does it Work?," (with Asli Demirguc-Kunt) Journal of Economic Perspectives 16 (Spring 2002), 175–195.

"Event-Study Evidence of the Value of Relaxing Longstanding Regulatory Restraints on Banks, 1970-2000" (with Kenneth A. Carow), Quarterly Review of Economics and Finance 42(Summer 2002), 439–463.

"The Dialectical Role of Information and Disinformation in Regulation-Induced Banking Crises," Pacific Basin Finance Journal 8 (2000), pp. 285–308.

"Architecture of Supra-National Financial Regulation," Journal of Financial Services Research, 18:2/3 (2000), 301–318.

"Incentives for Banking Megamergers: What Motives Might Regulators Infer from Event-Study Evidence?" Journal of Money, Credit and Banking, 32, (August 2000, Part 2), 671–701.

"Effectiveness of Capital Regulation at U.S. Commercial Banks, 1985 to 1994," (with Armen Hovakimian), Journal of Finance, Vol. LV, No. 1 (February 2000), 451–468.

"Bank Runs and Banking Policies: Lessons for African Policymakers," (with Tara Rice), Journal of African Economics 9, AERC Supplement2 (2000), 109–144.

"Using Disaster Planning to Optimize Expenditures on Financial Safety Nets," Atlantic Economic Journal, 29, (September 2001), 243–253.

"Financial Safety Nets: Reconstructing and Modelling a Policymaking Metaphor," The Journal of International Trade and Economic Development, 10, (September 2001), 237–273.

"Dynamic Inconsistency of Capital Forbearance: Long-Run vs. Short-Run Effects of Too-Big-to-Fail Policymaking," Pacific Basin Finance Journal 9, 281–299.

"Why Journal Editors Should Encourage the Replication of Applied Econometric Research," Quarterly Journal of Business and Economics 23 (Winter 1984).

“Ethical Conflicts in Managing the S&L Mess,” in Edward J. O’Boyle (ed.), Social Economics: Premises, Findings and Policies, London: Routledge, 1996, pp. 125–144.

“Politics and Policymaking: The More Things Change the More they Remain the Same,” Journal of Monetary Economics 6 (1980), 199–211.

"Relevance and Need for International Regulatory Standards," Proceedings of the Brookings-Wharton Conference on Integrating Emerging Market Countries into the Global Financial System.

"Bank Portfolio Allocation, Deposit Variability, and the Availability Doctrine," The Quarterly Journal of Economics, Vol LXXIX, (February 1965), 113–134.
