= Cov-lite =

Loan agreements without protective covenants for the lending party

Cov-lite (or "covenant light") is financial jargon for loan agreements that do not contain the usual protective covenants for the benefit of the lending party. Although traditionally banks have insisted on a wide range of covenants that allow them to intervene if the financial position of the borrower or the value of underlying assets deteriorates, around 2006 the increasing strength of private equity firms and the decreasing opportunities for traditional corporate loans made by banks fueled something of a "race to the bottom", with syndicates of banks competing with each other to offer ever less invasive terms to borrowers in relation to leveraged buy-outs.

During the 2008 financial crisis, growth in the use of cov-lite loans stalled, but more recently they have increased in popularity again.

Cov-lite lending is seen as riskier because it removes the early warning signs lenders would otherwise receive through traditional covenants. Against this, it has been countered that cov-lite loans simply reflect changes in bargaining power between borrowers and lenders, following from the increased sophistication in the loans market where risk is quickly dispersed through syndication or credit derivatives.

== Covenants ==
Practices vary, but characteristically cov-lite loans remove the requirement to report and maintain loan to value, gearing, and EBITDA ratios.

More aggressively negotiated cov-lite loans might also remove

- events of default relating to "material adverse change" of the position of the borrower
- requirement to deliver annual accounts to the banks
- restrictions on other third party debt
- restrictions on negative pledges
- requirements for bank approval to change the form of the debtor group's business

== Concerns ==
Many at the time were alarmed by the development. In particular, The Economist thought it was a concerning and short-sighted development. The Financial Times endorsed the view of Anthony Bolton of Fidelity Investments, who warned on his retirement in May 2007 that cov-lite could be "the tinder paper for a serious reversal in the market", and the movement in the market was inexorable. Others argued that the move to cov-lite was a welcome simplification of loan documentation, fully justified as the banks would hedge their risk by transferring exposure to the loan in the CDO market. It was also pointed out at the time that cov-lite loans operated in a very similar way to bonds, but at lower values.

The high-water mark of cov-lite loans came in the 2007 acquisition by Kohlberg Kravis Roberts, a US private equity firm, by way of a record $16bn cov-lite loan for its buy-out of First Data.

== 2007 credit crunch ==
The tendency towards cov-lite loans ended abruptly with the subprime mortgage crisis. Some commentators subsequently sought to attribute the credit crunch arising from crisis to cov-lite loans, although the LBO market is almost entirely unconnected with the sub-prime mortgage market in terms of exposure. However, in the credit crunch which ensued, cov-lite loans significantly hampered the ability of banks to step in and both seek to rectify positions which were going bad, and to limit their exposure once matters had gone bad. The suggestion that banks risks were mitigated through the CDO market was difficult to sustain in light of difficulties in that market itself as a result of the credit crunch. In March 2011 the Financial Times reported that, in the three months prior, cov-lite loans to the value of $17bn had been issued.

== Post credit-crunch market ==
As the credit markets recovered after all but shutting down in 2008–09, cov-lite loans returned to the syndicated loan market. Indeed, after seeing an impressive $86.7 billion in volume in 2012, cov-lite loans totaled some $93.5 billion through the first 3-plus months of 2013, just short of the record set in 2007. Unlike before the credit crunch, however, most covenant-lite loans in 2013 backed refinancing/repricing of existing loans, as opposed to M&A/LBO deals. Due to borrower-friendly lending conditions in 2018, cov-lite loans as a percentage of outstanding leveraged loans in European markets reached 78%, compared to under 10% in 2013. The ubiquity of cov-lite in leveraged corporate bonds is a characteristic of the corporate debt bubble, which became a topic of increasing worry in the late 2010s.
