= Zombie bank =

Bank with a net worth below zero

A zombie bank is a financial institution that has an economic net worth of less than zero but continues to operate because its ability to repay its debts is shored up by implicit or explicit government credit support.

The term was first used by Edward Kane in a 1987 article titled Dangers of Capital Forbearance: The Case of the F.S.L.I.C and 'Zombie S&L' s to explain the dangers of tolerating a large number of insolvent savings and loan associations and applied to the emerging Japanese crisis in 1993. A zombie bank can continue to operate and even grow as long as creditors remain confident in the relevant government's ability to extract the funds needed to back up its promises from current or future taxpayers. However, when this ability seems doubtful, zombie institutions face runs by uninsured depositors and margin calls from counterparties in derivatives transactions.

== Background ==
In an article published in the March/April 1992 issue of Society entitled, "The Savings and Loan Insurance Mess," Edward Kane expanded on the source of the analogy. "Although the Savings and Loan (S&L) debacle is extremely complex," Kane wrote, "simple-minded cartoons and horror movies can illustrate how the S&L insurance fund turned into such a mess. ...In movies such as George A. Romero's Night of the Living Dead and Dawn of the Dead, corpses climb out of their graves and walk around hunting for food. They are hungry for only one thing — human flesh. As soon as these living-dead "zombies" feed on another human, the human quickly dies and becomes a zombie too. Many S&Ls have, for some time, been zombie institutions. These institutions were insolvent in the sense that their assets had fallen below the level at which they could cover their deposit debt. These zombie S&Ls were able to survive only because they could feed off taxpayers through the device of government-guaranteed federal deposit insurance."

Tyler Cowen, a professor of economics at George Mason University, wrote for The New York Times in April 2011 that "If enough depositors fear frozen accounts, the banks will be emptied out, and they also will require additional government bailouts, on top of the bailouts for the bad real estate loans. The banks come to resemble empty shells, conduits for public aid but shrinking and unprofitable as businesses — and, to a large extent, that is already the case in Ireland. Portugal is moving in this same direction, toward being a land inhabited by zombie banks. It's the zombie banks that doom the current European bailout plans."

== Examples ==
=== Japan ===
In the 1990s, Japan suffered a collapse in real estate and stock market prices that pushed major banks into insolvency. Rather than follow the United States's tough recommendation to either close or recapitalize these banks, Japan kept banks marginally functional through explicit or implicit guarantees and piecemeal government bailouts. The resulting "zombie banks", neither alive nor dead, could not support long term economic growth which has resulted in economic stagnation in Japan since then.

=== Europe ===
After the 2008 financial crisis, banks in Europe have been described as zombies; with some Eurozone banks becoming dependent on the European Central Bank (ECB) for liquidity. This keeps these banks lending to companies and fostering growth.

On July 26, 2012 the ECB's president Mario Draghi launched the Outright Monetary Transactions (OMT) Program, which led to a significant increase in the value of sovereign bonds issued by European periphery countries. The regained stability of the European banking sector has not fully transferred into economic growth. The slow recovery is explained by bad credit allocations by zombie banks.

New restrictions imposed on European banks by the European Union, which took effect from January 2016, are meant to protect taxpayers from picking up the bill for rescuing banks as happened during the 2008 financial crisis.

=== United States ===
After the 2008 crisis, rigorous stress tests forced some banks to recapitalize. This may have prevented the phenomenon of zombie banks, but there is a possibility that zombie companies exist; their earnings are less than their interest expenses. Such companies are therefore incapable of making a profit, since all revenue is spent on repaying creditors and paying off expenses.

== Causes ==
Banks become zombies due to bad loans which they have made. In slow economies, businesses that borrowed from banks become unable to repay the loans. Capital infusions to a bank, received primarily from the government but also from central bank loans, turn it into a zombie bank.

These infusions are generally referred to as regulatory forbearance. They enable the banks to postpone the recognition of their losses. The government gives zombie banks cash-flow leeway in the hope that they will be able to make profits over time, thus being able to cover their losses and revitalize. Rather than pressing businesses for repayment, zombie banks often use the money received from the government to extend the terms of their loans to businesses, which in turn causes the existence of zombie companies.

Zombie banks are often created by financial panics, during which loans go bad and the value of assets shrinks.

== Effects ==
The rescuing of failing financial institutions, or zombie banks, also creates moral hazard: investors take risks without considering the negative consequences since they believe the government will help them out in case investments fail. Investors do not have incentive to be concerned about the risk-reward ratio, essential for healthy economy. Other effects of zombie banking include unpredictability of future earnings due to their non-performing assets on their balance sheet. Since zombie banks employ higher interest rates to attract investors, healthy banks suffer from competition and lose customers. Zombie banks can be reluctant to lend money to the private sector.

== See also ==
- Bad bank
- Bridge bank
- Zombie company
