= Ezra Holdings =

Ezra Holdings Ltd
- Type: Public
- Traded as: SGX: 5DN
- Industry: Petroleum Oil & Gas
- Founded: 1992; 34 years ago
- Headquarters: Singapore, Oslo, Houston
- Area served: Worldwide
- Key people: Mr Lionel Lee (managing director), Mr Koh Poh Tiong (Non-Executive chairman)
- Products: Offshore engineering and construction
- Revenue: US$543.8 million (2015)
- Net income: US$90.3 million (2015)
- Total assets: US$32.3 million (2017)
- Number of employees: 291 (April 2017)
- Website: www.ezraholdings.com www.emas.com

Ezra Holdings Ltd, also known under their operating brand name of EMAS, is an integrated offshore support provider for the oil and gas industry. The business was founded in 1992 and is headquartered in Singapore. Ezra was listed on the Singapore Exchange Securities Trading Limited (SESDAQ) and promoted to Mainboard on 8 December 2005.

== History ==
EMAS was founded in 1992 by Mr Lee Kian Soo. Headquartered in Singapore, EMAS is now an offshore service provider, with offices in 16 locations across 5 continents

- 1992 Founded. Incorporated EMAS Offshore to provide management and operation of offshore support vessels
- 2003 Launch of Initial public offering (IPO) in Singapore
- 2005 Acquisition of Vietnam Fabrication Yard, Asian Technical Maritime Services Ltd (ATMS) through wholly owned subsidiary HCM Logistics Limited & Promoted to SGX Main Board
- 2007 Buys strategic stake of 21.83% for S$16.5m in SGX-listed Nylect Technology Limited to extend its oil & gas support services activities
- 2008 Listing of Production & Construction division, EOC Limited, on the Mainboard of the Oslo Stock Exchange raising approximately US$ S$260 million
- 2011 Acquisition of Aker Marine Contractors AS (AMC) from Aker Solutions AS (a subsidiary of Oslo Bǿrslisted Aker Solutions ASA)
- 2011 Singapore's EMAS wins three charters worth $73 million
- 2014 EMAS wins Asia Pacific and West Africa contracts for FPSO work worth $125 million
- 2014 EMAS confirms various contract deals across the globe adding a further $95 million to the contract back catalogue for the company

== The Company ==
Ezra Holdings, through EMAS, operates four main business segments that together have the ability to execute a full spectrum of life-of-field engineering, construction, marine and production services throughout the world.

- EMAS Energy provides well intervention and drilling services both onshore and offshore. The range includes workover, drilling, fluid pumping, nitrogen and pipeline & process services.
- EMAS Marine manages and operates a fleet of anchor handling, towing & supply vessels, anchor handling tugs, platform supply vessels and fast crew utility boats. These vessels support the O&G industry in a wide range of offshore operations throughout the oilfield life cycle.
- EMAS Production, under approximately 46.5%-owned EOC Limited, owns and operates FPSO facilities, offering services such as FPSO conversion management and the operation & maintenance of production facilities. It has the capability and track record to design and provide FPSO/FSO mooring & riser systems and turrets, and fluid transfer systems.

The Group offers offshore fabrication and construction, logistics, engineering and support services out of Vietnam from its yard facilities in Ho Chi Minh City and Vung Tau, as well as in Hinna, Norway and Houston, USA.

EMAS AMC has been awarded a contract to carry out offshore installation services for US supermajor Chevron in the Gulf of Thailand.

== Management ==
Mr Lee Kian Soo serves as Executive Chairman of EMAS while Mr Lee Chye Tek Lionel serves as the managing director of EMAS. As managing director, Mr Lionel Lee manages its business and oversees day-to-day operations.

== Deep Water (EMAS AMC Division) ==
EMAS recently announced the completion of the acquisition of Aker Marine Contractors (AMC) of Houston in March 2011. The acquisition propels EMAS into the top ranks of the global SURF/EPIC services market.

EMAS recently said that it aims to win around $300 million of new subsea service contracts in Asia by April as the depletion of shallow fields in the region results in more deepwater drilling projects.

EMAS says to buy Aker Marine for $325 million.

== Bankruptcy ==
Ezra filed for U.S. bankruptcy in March 2017.
