= Lemon socialism =

Government subsidies to failing firms

Lemon socialism is a pejorative term for a form of government intervention in which government subsidies go to weak or failing firms (lemons; see Lemon law), with the effective result that the government (and thus the taxpayer) absorbs part or all of the recipient's losses. The term derives from the conception that in socialism the government may nationalize a company in its entirety, while in lemon socialism the company is allowed to keep its profits but its losses are shifted to the taxpayer. As ersatz capitalism, it may also refer to Joseph Stiglitz's assessment of neo-liberalism, cartelization and rent-seeking in the American economy, "run for and by the powerful".

Such payments may be made with the intent of preventing further, systemic damage to what might otherwise be considered a free marketplace. For example, the bailout that followed the 2008 financial crisis may be described as lemon socialism. The pejorative arises from the belief among free market economists that in a functional free market, failing companies would be replaced by better functioning companies in response to market demand.

The term may also be used to describe government efforts to nationalize companies or industries, in which the government takes over failing companies without taking over healthy companies. Advocates of free markets may then point to the faltering, nationalized enterprises as examples of how government regulation hurts business.

== Origin ==
Mark Green coined the phrase in a 1974 article discussing the utility company Con Ed.

The sentiment was earlier expressed in the adage "socialism for the rich and capitalism for the poor", which was in use by the 1960s, though the notion of privatizing profits and socializing losses dates at least to 1834 with Andrew Jackson's closing of the Second Bank of the United States and transfer of its assets to privately owned "pet banks" controlled by political allies.

Joseph Stiglitz used the term ersatz capitalism to describe a similar approach by Barack Obama.

== Other languages ==
In Icelandic, lemon socialism is known as Sósíalismi andskotans, meaning "the devil's socialism", a term coined by Vilmundur Jónsson (1889–1971, Iceland's Surgeon General) in the 1930s to criticize alleged crony capitalism in Landsbanki, which gained renewed currency in the debate over the 2008–2012 Icelandic financial crisis. Lemon socialism, or more precisely crony capitalism, is also referred to as Pilsfaldakapítalismi, meaning "skirt capitalism", pilsfaldur being the hemline of the skirt; and the term referring to children hiding behind their mothers' skirts after having done something wrong to criticize the alleged lack of transparency in dealings and reluctance to deal with bad consequences by themselves.

== See also ==
- British Leyland
- Corporate welfare
- Crony capitalism
- Gresham's law
- Regulatory capture
- Socialism for the rich and capitalism for the poor
- Too big to fail
- Zombie company
