= Too big to fail =

Theory in banking and finance

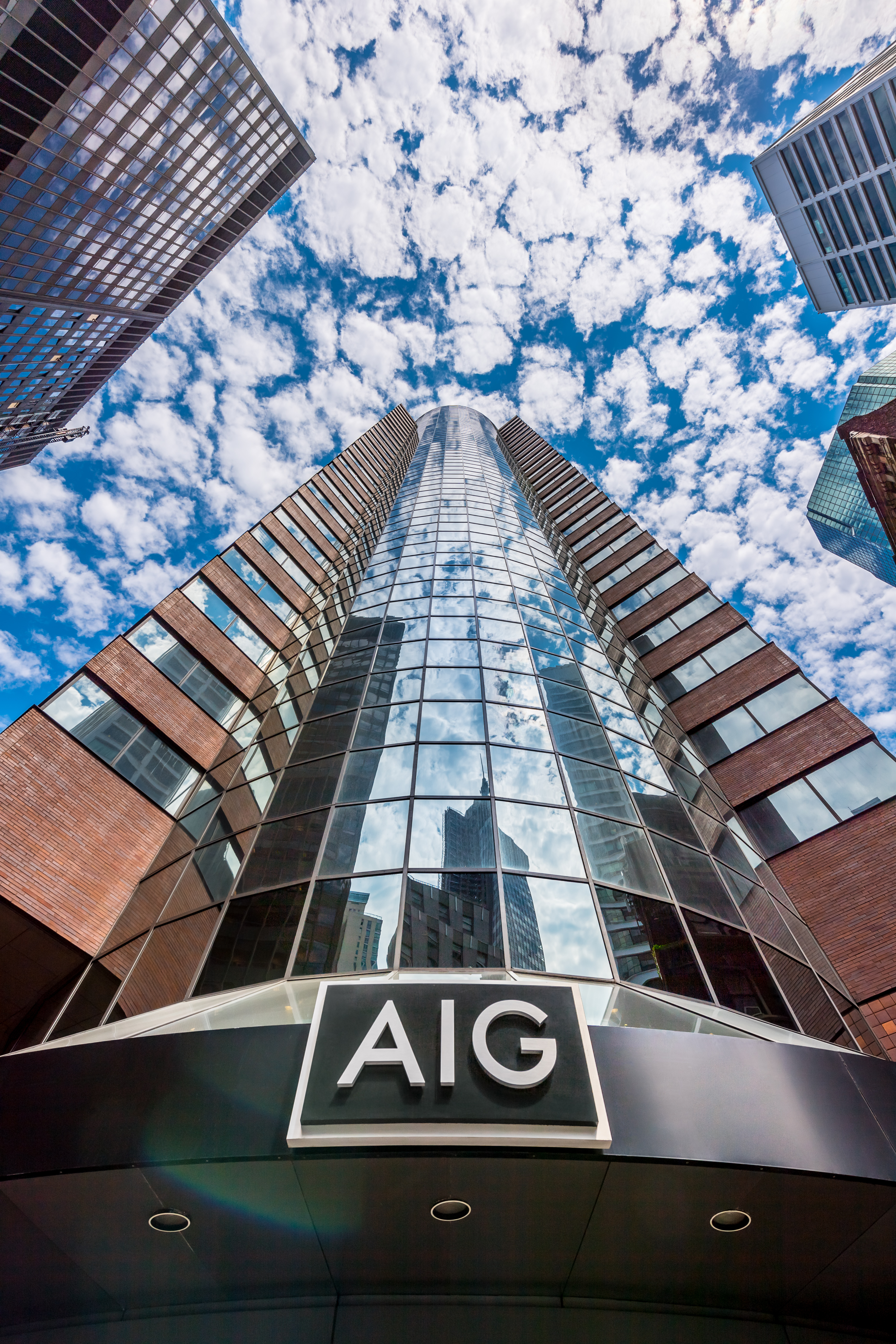
Headquarters of AIG, an insurance company rescued by the United States government during the subprime mortgage crisis

"Too big to fail" (TBTF) is a theory in banking and finance that asserts that certain corporations, particularly financial institutions, are so large and so interconnected with an economy that their failure would be disastrous to the greater economic system, and therefore should be supported by government when they face potential failure. The colloquial term "too big to fail" was popularized by U.S. congressman Stewart McKinney in a 1984 Congressional hearing, discussing the Federal Deposit Insurance Corporation's intervention with Continental Illinois. The term had previously been used occasionally in the press, and similar thinking had motivated earlier bank bailouts.

The term emerged as prominent in public discourse following the 2008 financial crisis. Critics see the policy as counterproductive and argue that large banks or other institutions should be left to fail if their risk management is ineffective. Some critics, such as economist Alan Greenspan, believe that such large organizations should be deliberately broken up: "If they're too big to fail, they're too big." Some economists, such as Paul Krugman, hold that financial crises arise principally from banks being under-regulated rather than their size, using the widespread collapse of small banks in the Great Depression to illustrate this argument.

In 2014, the International Monetary Fund and others said the problem still had not been dealt with. While the individual components of the new regulation for systemically important banks (additional capital requirements, enhanced supervision and resolution regimes) likely reduced the prevalence of TBTF, the fact that there is a definite list of systemically important banks considered TBTF has a partly offsetting impact.

== Definition ==
Federal Reserve Chair Ben Bernanke also defined the term in 2010: "A too-big-to-fail firm is one whose size, complexity, interconnectedness, and critical functions are such that, should the firm go unexpectedly into liquidation, the rest of the financial system and the economy would face severe adverse consequences." He continued that: "Governments provide support to too-big-to-fail firms in a crisis not out of favoritism or particular concern for the management, owners, or creditors of the firm, but because they recognize that the consequences for the broader economy of allowing a disorderly failure greatly outweigh the costs of avoiding the failure in some way. Common means of avoiding failure include facilitating a merger, providing credit, or injecting government capital, all of which protect at least some creditors who otherwise would have suffered losses. ... If the [subprime mortgage crisis] has a single lesson, it is that the too-big-to-fail problem must be solved."

Bernanke cited several risks with too-big-to-fail institutions:

1. These firms generate severe moral hazard: "If creditors believe that an institution will not be allowed to fail, they will not demand as much compensation for risks as they otherwise would, thus weakening market discipline; nor will they invest as many resources in monitoring the firm's risk-taking. As a result, too-big-to-fail firms will tend to take more risk than desirable, in the expectation that they will receive assistance if their bets go bad."
2. It creates an uneven playing field between big and small firms. "This unfair competition, together with the incentive to grow that too-big-to-fail provides, increases risk and artificially raises the market share of too-big-to-fail firms, to the detriment of economic efficiency as well as financial stability."
3. The firms themselves become major risks to overall financial stability, particularly in the absence of adequate resolution tools. Bernanke wrote: "The failure of Lehman Brothers and the near-failure of several other large, complex firms significantly worsened the crisis and the recession by disrupting financial markets, impeding credit flows, inducing sharp declines in asset prices, and hurting confidence. The failures of smaller, less interconnected firms, though certainly of significant concern, have not had substantial effects on the stability of the financial system as a whole."

== Background on banking regulation ==
=== Depository banks ===
Before the Great Depression, U.S. consumer bank deposits were not guaranteed by the government, increasing the risk of a bank run, in which a large number of depositors withdraw their funds simultaneously. Since banks lend out most of their deposits and only keep a fraction on hand, a bank run can render a bank insolvent. During the Depression, hundreds of banks became insolvent, and depositors lost their money. As a result, the U.S. enacted the 1933 Banking Act, sometimes called the Glass–Steagall Act, which created the Federal Deposit Insurance Corporation (FDIC) to insure deposits up to a limit of $2,500, with successive increases to the current $250,000. In exchange for the deposit insurance provided by the federal government, depository banks are highly regulated and expected to invest excess customer deposits in lower-risk assets. After the Great Depression, it became a problem for financial companies that they are too big to fail, because there is a close connection between financial institutions involved in financial market transactions. It brings liquidity to the markets of various financial instruments. The crisis in 2008 began when the liquidity and value of financial instruments held and issued by banks and other financial institutions declined sharply.

=== Investment banks and the shadow banking system ===
In contrast to depository banks, investment banks generally obtain funds from sophisticated investors and often make complex, risky investments with the funds, speculating either for their own account or on behalf of their investors. They are also "market makers" in that they serve as intermediaries between two investors who wish to take opposite sides of a financial transaction. The Glass–Steagall Act separated investment and depository banking until its repeal in 1999. Before 2008, the government did not explicitly guarantee the investor funds, so investment banks were not subject to the same regulations as depository banks and were allowed to take considerably more risk.

Investment banks, along with other innovations in banking and finance collectively referred to as the shadow banking system, had grown to rival the depository system by 2007. They were subject to the equivalent of a bank run in 2007 and 2008, in which investors (rather than depositors) withdrew funding from the shadow system. This run became known as the subprime mortgage crisis. During 2008, the five largest U.S. investment banks either failed (Lehman Brothers), were bought out by other banks at fire-sale prices (Bear Stearns and Merrill Lynch), or were at risk of failure and obtained depository banking charters to obtain additional Federal Reserve support (Goldman Sachs and Morgan Stanley). In addition, the government provided bailout funds via the Troubled Asset Relief Program in 2008.

Fed Chair Ben Bernanke described in November 2013 how the Panic of 1907 was essentially a run on the non-depository financial system, with many parallels to the 2008 crisis. One of the results of the Panic of 1907 was the creation of the Federal Reserve in 1913.

=== Resolution authority ===
Before 1950, U.S. federal bank regulators had essentially two options for resolving an insolvent institution: 1) closure, with liquidation of assets and payouts for insured depositors; or 2) purchase and assumption, encouraging the acquisition of assets and assumption of liabilities by another firm. A third option was made available by the Federal Deposit Insurance Act of 1950: providing assistance, the power to support an institution through loans or direct federal acquisition of assets, until it could recover from its distress.

The statute limited the "assistance" option to cases where "continued operation of the bank is essential to provide adequate banking service". Regulators shunned this third option for many years, fearing that if regionally or nationally important banks were thought generally immune to liquidation, markets in their shares would be distorted. Thus, the assistance option was never employed during the period 1950–1969, and very seldom thereafter. Research into historical banking trends suggests that the consumption loss associated with National Banking Era bank runs was far more costly than the consumption loss from stock market crashes.

The Federal Deposit Insurance Corporation Improvement Act was passed in 1991, giving the FDIC the responsibility for rescuing an insolvent bank by the least costly means. The Act had the implicit goal of eliminating the widespread belief among depositors that large banks would be protected from losses among depositors and bondholders. However, the Act included an exception in cases of systemic risk, subject to the approval of two-thirds of the FDIC board of directors, the Federal Reserve Board of Governors, and the Treasury Secretary.

== Analysis ==
=== Bank size and concentration ===
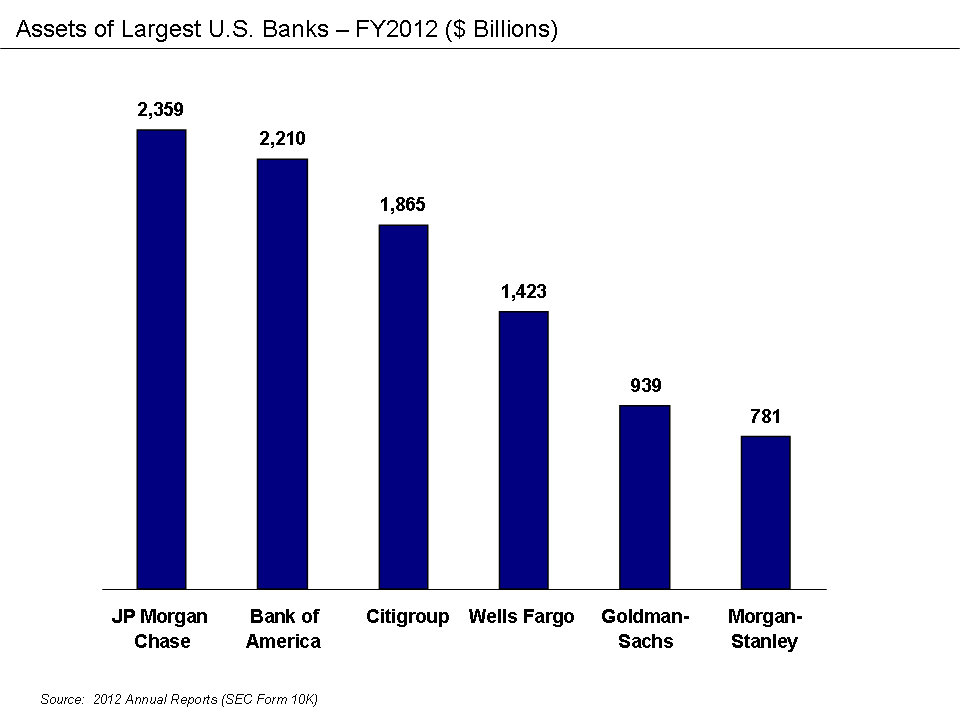
Assets of largest U.S. banks per FY2012 Annual Reports

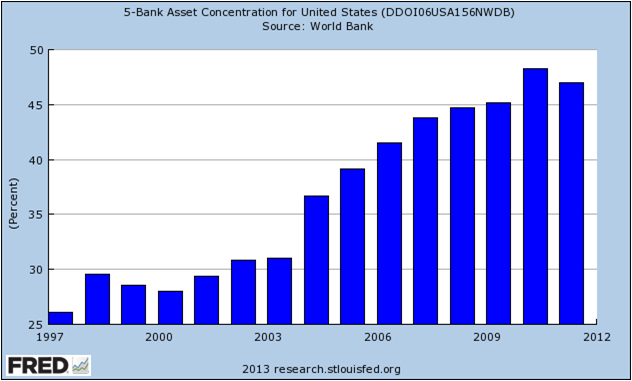
Percentage of banking assets held by largest five U.S. banks, 1997–2011

Bank size, complexity, and interconnectedness with other banks may inhibit the government's ability to resolve (wind down) the bank without significant disruption to the financial system or the economy, as occurred with the Lehman Brothers bankruptcy in September 2008. The risk of "too big to fail" entities increases the likelihood of a government bailout funded by taxpayer dollars.

The largest U.S. banks continue to grow larger while the concentration of bank assets increases. The six largest U.S. banks had assets of $9,576 billion as of year-end 2012, according to their 2012 annual reports (SEC Form 10-K). The top 5 U.S. banks had approximately 30% of the U.S. banking assets in 1998; this rose to 45% by 2008 and to 48% by 2010, before falling to 47% in 2011.

This concentration continued despite the subprime mortgage crisis and its aftermath. During March 2008, JPMorgan Chase acquired the investment bank, Bear Stearns. Bank of America acquired investment bank Merrill Lynch in September 2008. Wells Fargo acquired Wachovia in January 2009. Investment banks Goldman Sachs and Morgan Stanley obtained depository bank holding company charters, which gave them access to additional Federal Reserve credit lines.

Bank deposits for all U.S. banks ranged between approximately 60–70% of GDP from 1960 to 2006, then jumped during the crisis to a peak of nearly 84% in 2009 before falling to 77% by 2011.

The number of U.S. commercial and savings banks peaked at 14,495 in 1984; it fell to 6,532 by the end of 2010. The ten largest U.S. banks held nearly 50% of U.S. deposits as of 2011.

=== Implicit guarantee subsidy ===
Since the full amounts of deposits and debts of "too big to fail" banks are effectively guaranteed by the government, large depositors and investors view investments in these banks as safer than deposits at smaller banks. Therefore, large banks can pay lower interest rates to depositors and investors than small banks are obliged to pay.

In October 2009, Sheila Bair, at that time the Chairperson of the FDIC, commented:

"'Too big to fail' has become worse. It's become explicit when it was implicit before. It creates competitive disparities between large and small institutions, because everybody knows small institutions can fail. So it's more expensive for them to raise capital and secure funding." Research has shown that banking organizations are willing to pay an added premium for mergers that will put them over the asset sizes that are commonly viewed as the thresholds for being too big to fail.

A study conducted by the Center for Economic and Policy Research found that the difference between the cost of funds for banks with more than $100 billion in assets and the cost of funds for smaller banks widened dramatically after the formalization of the "too big to fail" policy in the U.S. in the fourth quarter of 2008. This shift in the large banks' cost of funds was in effect equivalent to an indirect "too big to fail" subsidy of $34 billion per year to the 18 U.S. banks with more than $100 billion in assets.

The editors of Bloomberg View estimated an $83 billion annual subsidy to the 10 largest United States banks, reflecting a funding advantage of 0.8 percentage points due to implicit government support, meaning the profits of such banks are largely a taxpayer-backed illusion.

Another study by Frederic Schweikhard and Zoe Tsesmelidakis estimated the amount saved by America's biggest banks from having a perceived safety net of a government bailout was $120 billion from 2007 to 2010. For America's biggest banks the estimated savings was $53 billion for Citigroup, $32 billion for Bank of America, $10 billion for JPMorgan, $8 billion for Wells Fargo, and $4 billion for AIG. The study noted that passage of the Dodd–Frank Act—which promised an end to bailouts—did nothing to raise the price of credit (i.e., lower the implicit subsidy) for the "too-big-to-fail" institutions.

One 2013 study (Acharya, Anginer, and Warburton) measured the funding-cost advantage conferred by implicit government support to large financial institutions. Credit spreads were lower by approximately 28 basis points (0.28%) on average over the 1990–2010 period, with a peak of more than 120 basis points in 2009. In 2010, the implicit subsidy was worth nearly $100 billion to the largest banks. The authors concluded: "Passage of Dodd–Frank did not eliminate expectations of government support."

Economist Randall S. Kroszner summarized several approaches to evaluating the funding cost differential between large and small banks. The paper discusses the methodology and does not specifically address whether larger institutions have an advantage.

In November 2013, the credit ratings agency Moody's reported that it would no longer assume the eight largest U.S. banks would receive government support in the event they faced bankruptcy. However, the GAO reported that politicians and regulators would still face significant pressure to bail out large banks and their creditors in the event of a financial crisis.

=== Moral hazard ===
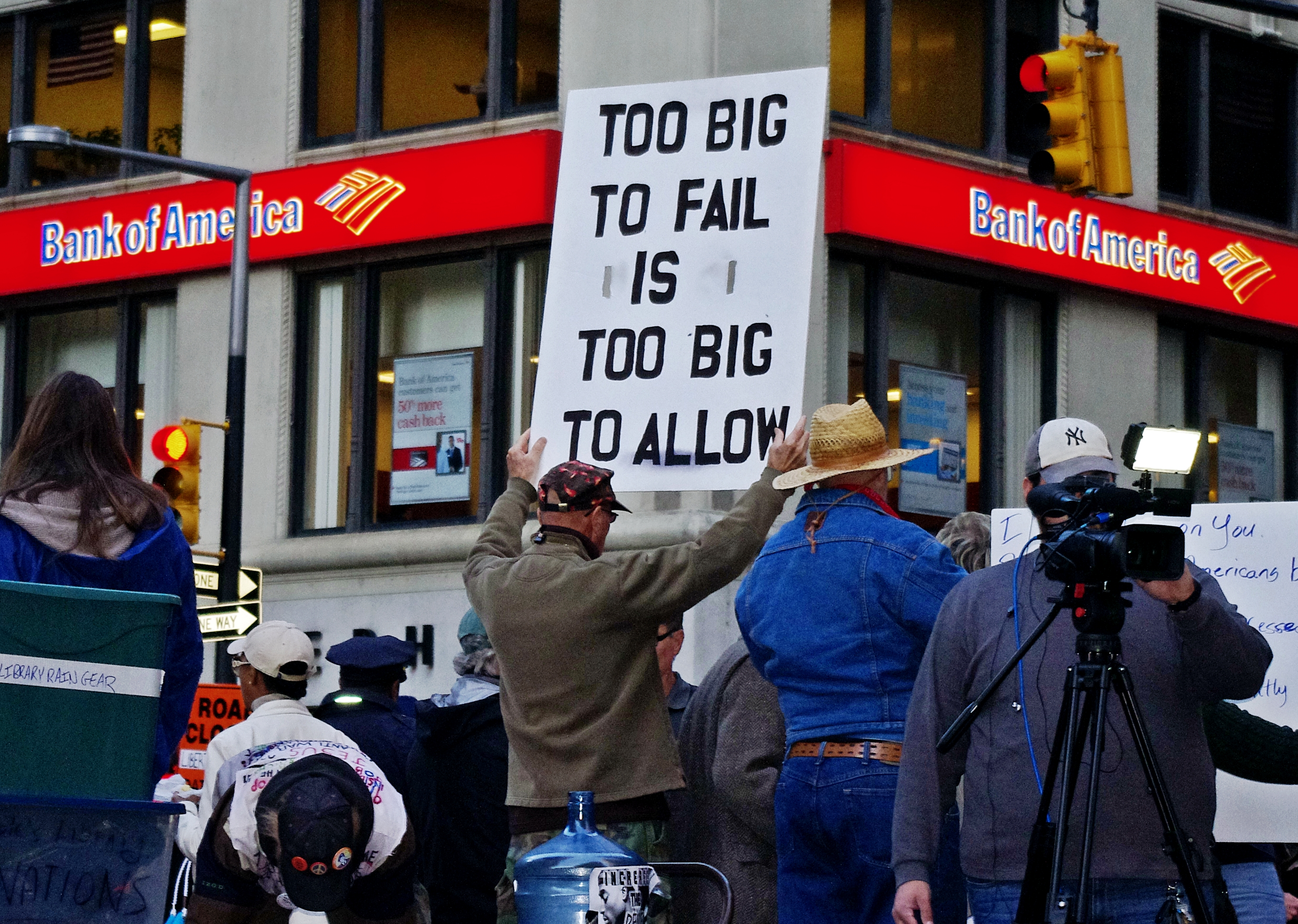
A man at Occupy Wall Street protesting institutions deemed too big to fail

Some critics have argued that "The way things are now banks reap profits if their trades pan out, but taxpayers can be stuck picking up the tab if their big bets sink the company." Additionally, as discussed by Senator Bernie Sanders, if taxpayers are contributing to rescue these companies from bankruptcy, they "should be rewarded for assuming the risk by sharing in the gains that result from this government bailout".

In this sense, Alan Greenspan affirms that, "Failure is an integral part, a necessary part of a market system." Thereby, although the financial institutions that were bailed out were indeed important to the financial system, the fact that they took risks beyond what they would otherwise, should be enough for the government to let them face the consequences of their actions. It would have been a lesson to motivate institutions to proceed differently next time.

=== Inability to prosecute ===
The political power of large banks and the risks of economic impact from major prosecutions have led to the use of the term "too big to jail" to describe the leaders of large financial institutions.

On March 6, 2013, then United States Attorney General Eric Holder testified to the Senate Judiciary Committee that the size of large financial institutions has made it difficult for the Justice Department to bring criminal charges when they are suspected of crimes, because such charges can threaten the existence of a bank. Therefore, their interconnectedness may endanger the national or global economy. "Some of these institutions have become too large," Holder told the Committee. "It has an inhibiting impact on our ability to bring resolutions that I think would be more appropriate." In this he contradicted earlier written testimony from a deputy assistant attorney general, who defended the Justice Department's "vigorous enforcement against wrongdoing". Holder has financial ties to at least one law firm benefiting from de facto immunity to prosecution, and prosecution rates against crimes by large financial institutions are at 20-year lows.

Four days later, Federal Reserve Bank of Dallas President Richard W. Fisher and Vice-President Harvey Rosenblum co-authored a Wall Street Journal op-ed about the failure of the Dodd–Frank Wall Street Reform and Consumer Protection Act to provide for adequate regulation of large financial institutions. In advance of his March 8 speech to the Conservative Political Action Conference, Fisher proposed requiring large banks to break up into smaller banks so that they are "too small to save", advocating withholding from mega-banks access to Federal Deposit Insurance and Federal Reserve discount windows, and requiring disclosure of this lack of federal insurance and financial solvency support to their customers. This was the first time such a proposal had been made by a high-ranking U.S. banking official or a prominent conservative. Other conservatives including Thomas Hoenig, Ed Prescott, Glenn Hubbard, and David Vitter also advocated breaking up the largest banks, but liberal commentator Matthew Yglesias questioned their motives and the existence of a true bipartisan consensus.

In a January 29, 2013, letter to Holder, Senators Sherrod Brown (D-Ohio) and Charles Grassley (R-Iowa) had criticized this Justice Department policy citing "important questions about the Justice Department's prosecutorial philosophy". After receipt of a DoJ response letter, Brown and Grassley issued a statement saying, "The Justice Department's response is aggressively evasive. It does not answer our questions. We want to know how and why the Justice Department has determined that certain financial institutions are 'too big to jail' and that prosecuting those institutions would damage the financial system."

Kareem Serageldin pleaded guilty on November 22, 2013, for his role in inflating the value of mortgage bonds as the housing market collapsed, and was sentenced to two and a half years in prison. As of April 30, 2014, Serageldin remains the only Wall Street executive prosecuted as a result of the 2008 financial crisis. The much smaller Abacus Federal Savings Bank was prosecuted (but exonerated after a jury trial) for selling fraudulent mortgages to Fannie Mae.

== Solutions ==
Simon Johnson claims breaking up "too big to fail" banks is controversial. Other options include introducing regulations to reduce risk, adding higher bank taxes for larger institutions, monetary reform, and increasing monitoring through oversight committees.

=== Breaking up the largest banks ===
More than fifty economists, financial experts, bankers, finance industry groups, and banks themselves have called for breaking up large banks into smaller institutions. This is advocated both to limit risk to the financial system posed by the largest banks as well as to limit their political influence.

For example, economist Joseph Stiglitz wrote in 2009 that: "In the United States, the United Kingdom, and elsewhere, large banks have been responsible for the bulk of the [bailout] cost to taxpayers. America has let 106 smaller banks go bankrupt this year alone. It's the mega-banks that present the mega-costs ... banks that are too big to fail are too big to exist. If they continue to exist, they must exist in what is sometimes called a 'utility' model, meaning that they are heavily regulated." He also wrote about several causes of the subprime mortgage crisis related to the size, incentives, and interconnection of the mega-banks.

=== Reducing risk-taking through regulation ===
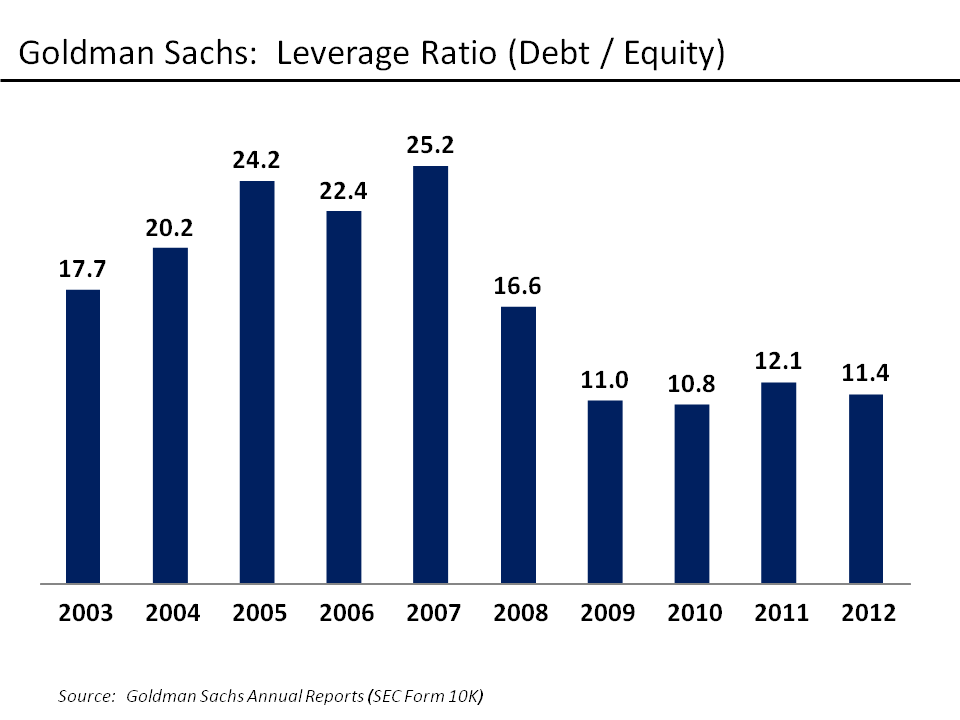
The leverage ratio, measured as debt divided by equity, for investment bank Goldman Sachs from 2003 to 2012. The lower the ratio, the greater the ability of the firm to withstand losses.

The United States passed the Dodd–Frank Act in July 2010 to help strengthen regulation of the financial system in the wake of the subprime mortgage crisis that began in 2007. Dodd–Frank requires banks to reduce risk-taking by mandating greater financial cushions (e.g., lower leverage ratios or higher capital ratios), among other measures.

Banks are required to maintain a ratio of high-quality, easily sold assets in the event of financial difficulty either at the bank or in the financial system. These are liquidity requirements.

Since the 2008 crisis, regulators have worked with banks to reduce leverage ratios. For example, the leverage ratio for investment bank Goldman Sachs declined from a peak of 25.2 during 2007 to 11.4 in 2012, indicating a much-reduced risk profile.

The Dodd–Frank Act includes a form of the Volcker Rule, a proposal to ban proprietary trading by commercial banks. Proprietary trading refers to using customer deposits to speculate in risky assets for the benefit of the bank rather than customers. The Dodd–Frank Act, as enacted into law, includes several loopholes to the ban, allowing proprietary trading in certain circumstances. However, the regulations required to enforce these elements of the law were not implemented during 2013 and were under attack by bank lobbying efforts.

Another major banking regulation, the Glass–Steagall Act from 1933, was effectively repealed in 1999. The repeal allowed depository banks to enter into additional lines of business. Senators John McCain and Elizabeth Warren proposed bringing back Glass–Steagall in 2013.

=== Too big to fail tax ===
Economist Willem Buiter proposes a tax to internalize the massive costs inflicted by a "too big to fail" institution. "When size creates externalities, do what you would do with any negative externality: tax it. The other way to limit size is to tax size. This can be done through progressive capital requirements with the size of the business (as measured by value added, balance sheet size, or another metric). Such measures for preventing the New Darwinism of the survival of the fittest and the politically best connected should be distinguished from regulatory interventions based on the narrow leverage ratio aimed at regulating risk (regardless of size, except for a de minimis lower limit)."

=== Monitoring ===
The Financial Stability Board, a policy research and development entity, releases an annual list of banks worldwide that are considered "systemically important financial institutions"—financial organizations whose size and role mean that any failure could cause serious systemic problems. As of 2022, these are:

- JPMorgan Chase
- Bank of America
- Citigroup
- HSBC Holdings plc
- Bank of China
- Barclays
- BNP Paribas
- Deutsche Bank
- Goldman Sachs
- Industrial and Commercial Bank of China
- Mitsubishi UFJ Financial Group
- Agricultural Bank of China
- BNY Mellon
- China Construction Bank
- Credit Suisse*
- Groupe BPCE
- Crédit Agricole
- ING Bank
- Mizuho Financial Group
- Morgan Stanley
- Royal Bank of Canada
- Banco Santander
- Société Générale
- Standard Chartered
- State Street Corporation
- Sumitomo Mitsui Banking Corporation
- Toronto-Dominion Bank
- UBS
- UniCredit
- Wells Fargo

*Note: In the wake of the 2023 banking crisis, the Swiss government facilitated an acquisition of Credit Suisse by UBS to avoid the former's collapse. UBS completed the acquisition in June 2023, thereby making Credit Suisse the first failure of a bank considered "too big to fail" since the 2008 financial crisis.

== Notable views on the issue ==
=== Economists ===
More than fifty notable economists, financial experts, bankers, finance industry groups, and banks themselves have called for breaking up large banks into smaller institutions. (See also Divestment.)

Some economists, such as Paul Krugman, hold that bank crises arise from banks being underregulated rather than from their size in itself. Krugman wrote in January 2010 that it was more important to reduce bank risk-taking (leverage) than to break them up.

Economist Simon Johnson has advocated both increased regulation and breaking up the larger banks, not only to protect the financial system but to reduce the political power of the largest banks.

=== Government officials ===
On March 6, 2013, United States attorney general Eric Holder told the Senate Judiciary Committee that the Justice Department faces difficulty charging large banks with crimes because of the risk to the economy. Four days later, Federal Reserve Bank of Dallas president Richard W. Fisher wrote in advance of a speech to the Conservative Political Action Conference that large banks should be broken up into smaller banks, and both Federal Deposit Insurance and Federal Reserve discount window access should end for large banks.

Ben Bernanke, the chairman of the Federal Reserve from 2006 to 2014, said more bankers should have gone to jail.

=== Central bankers ===
Mervyn King, the governor of the Bank of England during 2003–2013, called for cutting "too big to fail" banks down to size, as a solution to the problem of banks having taxpayer-funded guarantees for their speculative investment banking activities. "If some banks are thought to be too big to fail, then, in the words of a distinguished American economist, they are too big. It is not sensible to allow large banks to combine high street retail banking with risky investment banking or funding strategies, and then provide an implicit state guarantee against failure."

Former chancellor of the exchequer Alistair Darling disagreed: "Many people talk about how to deal with the big banks – banks so important to the financial system that they cannot be allowed to fail, but the solution is not as simple, as some have suggested, as restricting the size of the banks". Additionally, Alan Greenspan said that "If they're too big to fail, they're too big", suggesting U.S. regulators to consider breaking up large financial institutions considered "too big to fail". He added, "I don't think merely raising the fees or capital on large institutions or taxing them is enough ... they'll absorb that, they'll work with that, and it's totally inefficient and they'll still be using the savings."

=== International organizations ===
On April 10, 2013, International Monetary Fund managing director Christine Lagarde told the Economic Club of New York "too big to fail" banks had become "more dangerous than ever" and had to be controlled with "comprehensive and clear regulation [and] more intensive and intrusive supervision".

== Public opinion polls ==
Gallup reported in June 2013 that: "Americans' confidence in U.S. banks increased to 26% in June, up from the record low of 21% the previous year. The percentage of Americans saying they have 'a great deal' or 'quite a lot' of confidence in U.S. banks is now at its highest point since June 2008, but remains well below its pre-recession level of 41%, measured in June 2007. Between 2007 and 2012, confidence in banks fell by half—20 percentage points." Gallup also reported that: "When Gallup first measured confidence in banks in 1979, 60% of Americans had a great deal or quite a lot of confidence in them—second only to the church. This high level of confidence, which hasn't been matched since, was likely the result of the strong U.S. banking system established after the 1930s Great Depression and the related efforts of banks and regulators to build Americans' confidence in that system."

== Lobbying by banking industry ==
In the US, the banking industry spent over $100 million lobbying politicians and regulators between January 1 and June 30, 2011. Lobbying in the finance, insurance and real estate industries has risen annually since 1998 and was approximately $500 million in 2012.

== Historical examples ==
Before the 2008 failure and bailout of multiple firms, there were "too big to fail" examples from 1763 when Leendert Pieter de Neufville in Amsterdam and Johann Ernst Gotzkowsky in Berlin failed, and from the 1980s and 1990s. These included Continental Illinois and Long-Term Capital Management.

=== Continental Illinois case ===
An early example of a bank rescued because it was "too big to fail" was the Continental Illinois National Bank and Trust Company during the 1980s.

==== Distress ====
The Continental Illinois National Bank and Trust Company experienced a fall in its overall asset quality during the early 1980s. Tight money, Mexico's default (1982), and plunging oil prices followed a period when the bank had aggressively pursued commercial lending business, Latin American syndicated loan business, and loan participation in the energy sector. Complicating matters further, the bank's funding mix was heavily dependent on large certificates of deposit and foreign money markets, which meant its depositors were more risk-averse than average retail depositors in the US.

==== Payments crisis ====
The bank held significant participation in highly speculative oil and gas loans of Oklahoma's Penn Square Bank. When Penn Square failed in July 1982, the Continental's distress became acute, culminating with press rumors of failure and an investor-and-depositor run in early May 1984. In the first week of the run, the Fed permitted Continental Illinois discount window credits on the order of $3.6 billion. Still in significant distress, the management obtained an additional $4.5 billion in credit from a syndicate of money-center banks the following week. These measures failed to stop the run, and regulators were confronted with a crisis.

==== Regulatory crisis ====
The seventh-largest bank in the nation by deposits would be unable to meet its obligations very shortly. Regulators faced a tough decision about how to resolve the matter. Of the three options available, only two were seriously considered. Even banks much smaller than Continental were deemed unsuitable for resolution through liquidation, owing to the disruptions it would inevitably cause. The normal course would be to seek a purchaser (and indeed, press accounts that such a search was underway contributed to Continental depositors' fears in 1984). However, in the tight-money financial climate of the early 1980s, no purchaser was forthcoming.

Besides generic concerns about size and the contagion of depositor panic and bank distress, regulators feared significant disruption to national payment and settlement systems. Of special concern was the wide network of correspondent banks with high percentages of their capital invested in Continental Illinois. Essentially, the bank was deemed "too big to fail", and the "provide assistance" option was reluctantly taken. The dilemma then became how to assist without significantly unbalancing the nation's banking system.

==== Trying to stop the run ====
To prevent immediate failure, the Federal Reserve announced categorically that it would meet any liquidity needs Continental might have. At the same time, the Federal Deposit Insurance Corporation (FDIC) gave depositors and general creditors a full guarantee (not subject to the $100,000 FDIC deposit-insurance limit) and provided direct assistance of $2 billion (including participations). Money center banks assembled an additional $5.3 billion unsecured facility pending a resolution and the resumption of normal business operations. These measures slowed, but did not stop, the outflow of deposits.

==== Controversy ====
In a United States Senate hearing afterwards, the then Comptroller of the Currency C. T. Conover defended his position by admitting the regulators will not let the largest 11 banks fail.

=== Long-Term Capital Management ===
Long-Term Capital Management L.P. (LTCM) was a hedge fund management firm based in Greenwich, Connecticut, that used absolute-return trading strategies combined with high financial leverage. The firm's master hedge fund, Long-Term Capital Portfolio L.P., collapsed in the late 1990s, leading to an agreement on September 23, 1998, among 14 financial institutions for a $3.6 billion recapitalization (bailout) under the supervision of the Federal Reserve.

LTCM was founded in 1994 by John W. Meriwether, the former vice-chairman and head of bond trading at Salomon Brothers. Members of LTCM's board of directors included Myron S. Scholes and Robert C. Merton, who shared the 1997 Nobel Memorial Prize in Economic Sciences for a "new method to determine the value of derivatives". Initially successful, with annualized returns of over 40% (after fees) in its first years, the fund lost $4.6 billion in less than four months in 1998 following the Russian financial crisis, prompting Federal Reserve intervention; it was liquidated and dissolved in early 2000.

== International ==
=== Canada ===
In March 2013, the Office of the Superintendent of Financial Institutions announced that Canada's six largest banks, Bank of Montreal, Bank of Nova Scotia, Canadian Imperial Bank of Commerce, National Bank of Canada, Royal Bank of Canada and Toronto-Dominion Bank, were too big to fail. Those six banks accounted for 90% of Canada's banking assets at the time. It noted that "the differences among the largest banks are smaller if only domestic assets are considered, and relative importance declines rapidly after the top five banks and after the sixth bank (National)."

=== South Korea ===
The South Korean government's choice to lend money to failing firms leading up to the 1997 Asian financial crisis created an impression that chaebols were too big to fail. Numerous big firms, however, were allowed to fail.

=== New Zealand ===
Despite the government's assurances, opposition parties and some media commentators in New Zealand say that the largest banks are too big to fail and have an implicit government guarantee.

=== United Kingdom ===
George Osborne, Chancellor of the Exchequer under David Cameron (2010–2016), threatened to break up banks that are too big to fail.

The too-big-to-fail idea has led to legislators and governments facing the challenge of limiting the scope of these hugely important organizations, and regulating activities perceived as risky or speculative—to achieve this regulation in the UK, banks are advised to follow the UK's Independent Commission on Banking Report.

== See also ==
- Brown–Kaufman amendment
- Bulge bracket
- Corporate welfare
- Crony capitalism
- Dirigisme
- Greenspan put
- Lemon socialism
- Liquidity trap
- Speculative bubble
- Too connected to fail

=== Banking collapse ===
- List of bank failures in the United States (2008–present)
- List of banks acquired or bankrupted in the United States during the 2008 financial crisis
- List of largest bank failures in the United States

=== General ===
- Corporatocracy
- Lender of last resort
- Zombie company, and zombie bank

=== Works ===
- Too Big to Fail (book)
- Too Big to Fail (film)
- Abacus: Small Enough to Jail
