= Todd M. Harper =

American civil servant

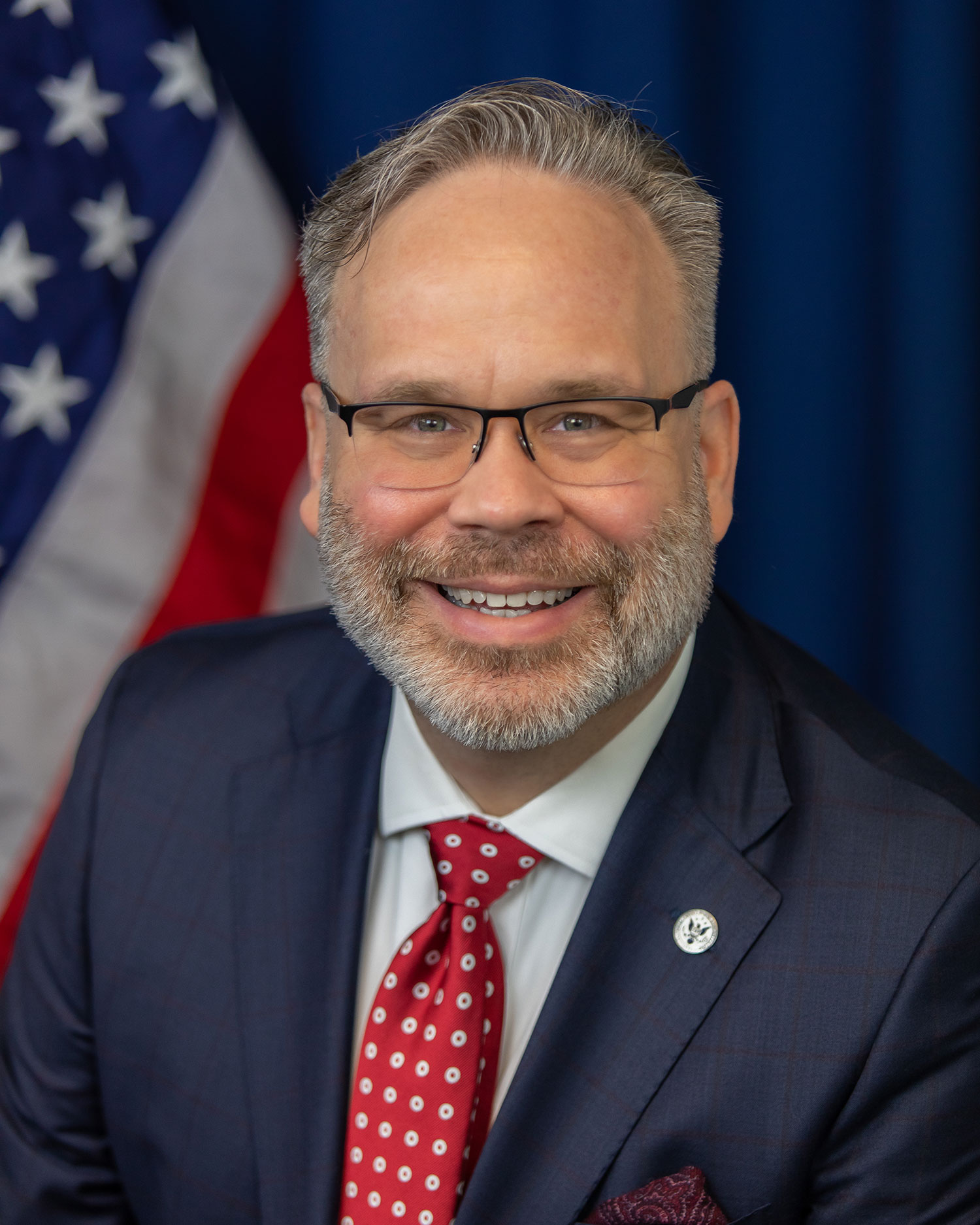

Board Member of the National Credit Union Administration
- In office April 8, 2019 – April 16, 2025
- President: Donald Trump; Joe Biden; Donald Trump
- Preceded by: Debbie Matz

Chairman of the National Credit Union Administration
- In office January 20, 2021 – January 20, 2025
- President: Joe Biden
- Preceded by: Rodney E. Hood
- Succeeded by: Kyle S. Hauptman

Personal details
- Party: Democratic
- Domestic partner: Tom Beers
- Education: Indiana University (BS) Harvard Kennedy School (MPP)
- Website: NCUA Biography

Todd Mitchell Harper is an American civil servant. He served as a Board Member of the National Credit Union Administration (NCUA). Harper was nominated to the NCUA Board by President Donald Trump in 2019 and was designated Chairman by President Joseph R. Biden on January 20, 2021, a position he held until January 20, 2025.

In mid-2021, President Biden renominated, and the U.S. Senate reconfirmed Chairman Harper for another term on the NCUA Board expiring on April 10, 2027.

While serving as the NCUA's twelfth Board Chairman, Mr. Harper also served as a voting member of the Financial Stability Oversight Council (FSOC) and represented the NCUA on the Federal Financial Institutions Examination Council (FFIEC) and the Financial and Banking Information Infrastructure Committee (FBIIC) under the President's Working Group on Financial Markets.

== Education ==
Harper received his undergraduate degree in business analysis from Indiana University's Kelley School of Business, and a graduate degree in public policy from Harvard University's Kennedy School of Government in 1996.

== Career ==
=== U.S. House of Representatives ===
Harper served in various capacities for the Honorable Rep. Paul E. Kanjorski (D-PA), including as legislative director and senior legislative assistant. Harper also served as staff director for the U.S. House Financial Services Subcommittee on Capital Markets, Insurance, and Government-Sponsored Enterprises.

In these roles, Harper contributed to major financial services law, from the enactment of the Gramm-Leach-Bliley Financial Services Modernization Act in 1999 through the passage of the Dodd-Frank Wall Street Reform and Consumer Protection Act in 2010.

During the Great Recession, Harper coordinated the first congressional hearing to explore the creation of a Temporary Corporate Credit Union Stabilization Fund. He also spearheaded staff efforts in the U.S. House of Representatives to secure enactment of a law to lower the costs of managing both the NCUA Corporate Stabilization Fund and the National Credit Union Share Insurance Fund.

Harper led staff negotiations over several sections of the Dodd-Frank Act, including the Kanjorski amendment to empower regulators to preemptively rein in and break up "too-big-to-fail" institutions and proposals to enhance the powers of the Securities and Exchange Commission. He also developed the legislative framework that created the Federal Insurance Office (FIO) within the U.S. Department of the Treasury to monitor domestic and international insurance issues.

=== National Credit Union Administration ===
Harper was the Director of Public and Congressional Affairs and served as Chief Policy Advisor for the former NCUA Chairwoman Debbie Matz (2011 to 2016) and Chairman Rick Metsger (2016 to 2017).

On February 1, 2019, President Donald Trump announced his intent to nominate Harper to the NCUA Board, and his formal nomination occurred February 6, 2019. The Senate Banking Committee held its confirmation hearing on February 14, 2019, and unanimously approved Harper's nomination on February 26, 2019. The Senate confirmed him by voice vote on March 14, 2019. Harper took the oath of office on April 8, 2019.

On January 20, 2021, President Joseph R. Biden designated Harper as NCUA Chairman. Harper succeeded Rodney E. Hood.

On August 6, 2021, President Biden announced his intent to nominate Harper to a six-year term on the NCUA Board. The Senate confirmed his nomination by a 59 to 40 vote on June 6, 2022. His term runs through April 10, 2027.

U.S. Senator Sherrod C. Brown (D-OH), Chairman of the U.S. Senate Committee on Banking, Housing, and Urban Affairs at the time, released the following statement after the Senate confirmed Todd Harper for Chairman of the NCUA, "I applaud the confirmation of Todd Harper for Chairman of the National Credit Union Administration," Brown said. "Mr. Harper understands the vital role that credit unions play in local communities – especially rural and underserved communities – and I know he will work collaboratively as Chairman to ensure that our credit union system is safe, sound, and works for all its members."

Harper was succeeded as Chairman on January 20, 2025 by Kyle S. Hauptman.

=== Federal Financial Institutions Examination Council ===
In April 2021, Harper became Chairman of the Federal Financial Institutions Examination Council (FFIEC). He served as Chairman of FFIEC from April 1, 2021, to March 31, 2023. He remained on the FFIEC representing the NCUA until January 20, 2025.
