= GSIB =

GSIB may refer to:

- Global Systemically Important Bank, a bank designated by the Financial Stability Board as being of critical importance
- Graduate School of International Business, the business school of the Academy of National Economy in Moscow
