= J. Mark McWatters =

10th Board Chairman of the NCUA

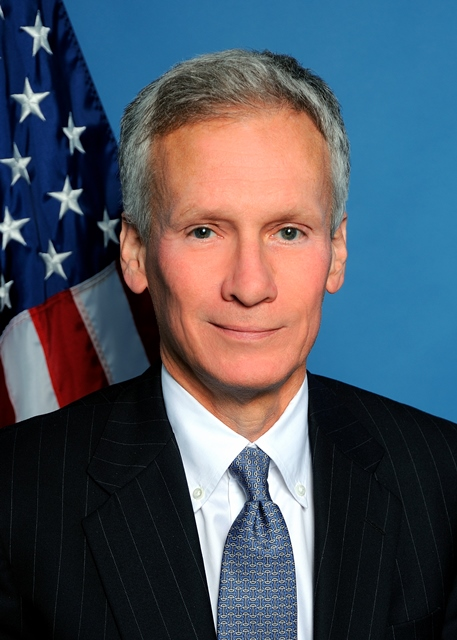

Chairman of the National Credit Union Administration
- In office June 23, 2017 – April 7, 2019
- President: Donald Trump
- Preceded by: Rick Metsger
- Succeeded by: Rodney E. Hood

NCUA Board Member
- In office January 23, 2017 – November 20, 2020
- President: Donald Trump

Personal details
- Born: John Mark McWatters
- Education: University of Texas School of Law JD, Columbia University School of Law LLM, New York University School of Law LLM
- Website: NCUA biography

John Mark McWatters is a lawyer, accountant and former board member of the National Credit Union Administration (NCUA). He was appointed by President Donald Trump on June 23, 2017, to serve as the tenth board chairman of the NCUA, and resigned from the NCUA Board on November 20, 2020.

McWatters was previously designated by President Trump in January 2017 to serve as acting chairman of the NCUA. In January 2014, President Barack Obama nominated McWatters as the Republican member of the three-member board of the NCUA.

== Education ==
McWatters received a B.B.A. from Texas Christian University, an M.B.A. from Michigan State University, a JD degree from the University of Texas School of Law an LLM from Columbia School of Law and an L.L.M. from the New York University School of Law. McWatters is also a Certified Public Accountant in Texas.

== Early career ==
McWatters was a tax and corporate counsel at HBK Capital Management LP. He was a partner at Patton Boggs LLP and Fulbright & Jaworski LLP, a partner and associate at Hughes & Luce LLP, and an associate with McGinnis, Lochridge & Kilgore LLP. He served as a judicial clerk for Judge Walter Ely of the United States Ninth Circuit Court of Appeals from 1982 to 1983.

McWatters was the assistant dean for graduate programs and as a professor of practice at the Southern Methodist University Dedman School of Law and an adjunct professor at the Southern Methodist University Cox School of Business. He was on the governing board of the Texas Department of Housing and Community Affairs and the advisory committee of the Texas Emerging Technology Fund.

McWatters was counsel to Representative Jeb Hensarling (R-Texas) on Troubled Asset Relief Program Congressional Oversight Panel.

== NCUA Board ==
McWatters was nominated to the NCUA Board as the Republican member of the three-member board by President Barack Obama on January 7, 2014. Following Senate confirmation, he took office as an NCUA board member on August 26, 2014. He succeeded former chairman and NCUA Board Member Michael E. Fryzel, who left the NCUA Board on August 26, 2014.

President Trump designated J. Mark McWatters as acting chairman of the NCUA Board on January 26, 2017, and then as chairman on June 23, 2017. McWatters succeeded Rick Metsger, who had been designated board chairman by President Obama in May 2016. As chairman, McWatters earns $165,300. As NCUA Board Chairman, McWatters served as a voting member of the Financial Stability Oversight Council. He also represents the NCUA on the Federal Financial Institutions Examination Council, the Financial, and Banking Information Infrastructure Committee, and on the board of NeighborWorks America.

Given the overall success of the Corporate System Resolution Program, the NCUA's legal recoveries, and improvements in the value of the legacy assets, McWatters proposed in 2016 the agency close the Stabilization Fund four years ahead of its scheduled expiration in 2021. The NCUA Board voted unanimously at its September 2017 open meeting to close the Stabilization Fund and to merge its remaining assets and obligations into the Share Insurance Fund, as required by the Federal Credit Union Act. This action resulted in a distribution of $736 million to eligible federally insured credit unions in the third quarter of 2018.

During McWatters’ tenure as chairman, the NCUA Board approved rules providing greater transparency and accountability to credit union members during voluntary mergers, providing better due process for credit unions appealing supervisory decisions, and improving the appeals process for agency program decisions.

McWatters advocated for regulatory change that would expand how credit unions define their fields of membership.

McWatters works remotely from Dallas. The NCUA is located Alexandria, Virginia. Government watchdog groups have described it as highly unusual for an agency chief to work routinely from home. Asked by The Washington Post about this practice, an NCUA spokesperson said it had no impact on NCUA operations.

On November 20, 2020, McWatters was forced off the NCUA board.

=== Expenses investigation ===
On May 14, 2018, the inspector general of the NCUA published an investigative report in response to whistleblower allegations of extravagant travel and entertainment expenses claimed by McWatters.

The Washington Post reported in January 2019 that McWatters and his chief of staff spent more than $2,500 on alcohol in 2016 and 2017, most of it under the chief of staff's expenses account. There is a written policy in place that prohibits federal government workers from using expense accounts for alcohol purchases. McWatters frequently dined in lavish restaurants with industry officials and lobbyists at taxpayer expense. According to The Washington Post, "From the beginning of his tenure, McWatters spent money in the style of a corporate executive, including the use of hired limousines and the purchase of nearly $22,000 worth of furniture for a headquarters office he rarely used."

Preceded by Rick Metsger	Chairman, National Credit Union Administration Board; June 23, 2017 – April 7, 2019	Succeeded by Rodney E. Hood
