= Paperwork (disambiguation) =

Paperwork refers to written documents or the work needed to create them.

Paperwork may also refer to:

- Paperwork (album), by T.I., 2014 and its title song
- "Paperwork" (song), by ¥$, 2024
- Paperwork, a 2006 album by Lil' Troy

== See also ==
- PaperWorks, a computer program introduced by Xerox Corporation in 1992
- Paperwork reduction, loosening or reducing documentation requirements
  - Paperwork Reduction Act, a United States federal law enacted in 1980
  - Economic Growth and Regulatory Paperwork Reduction Act, 1996 US federal law
  - Government Paperwork Elimination Act, 1998 US federal law
