= Debbie Matz =

American civil servant

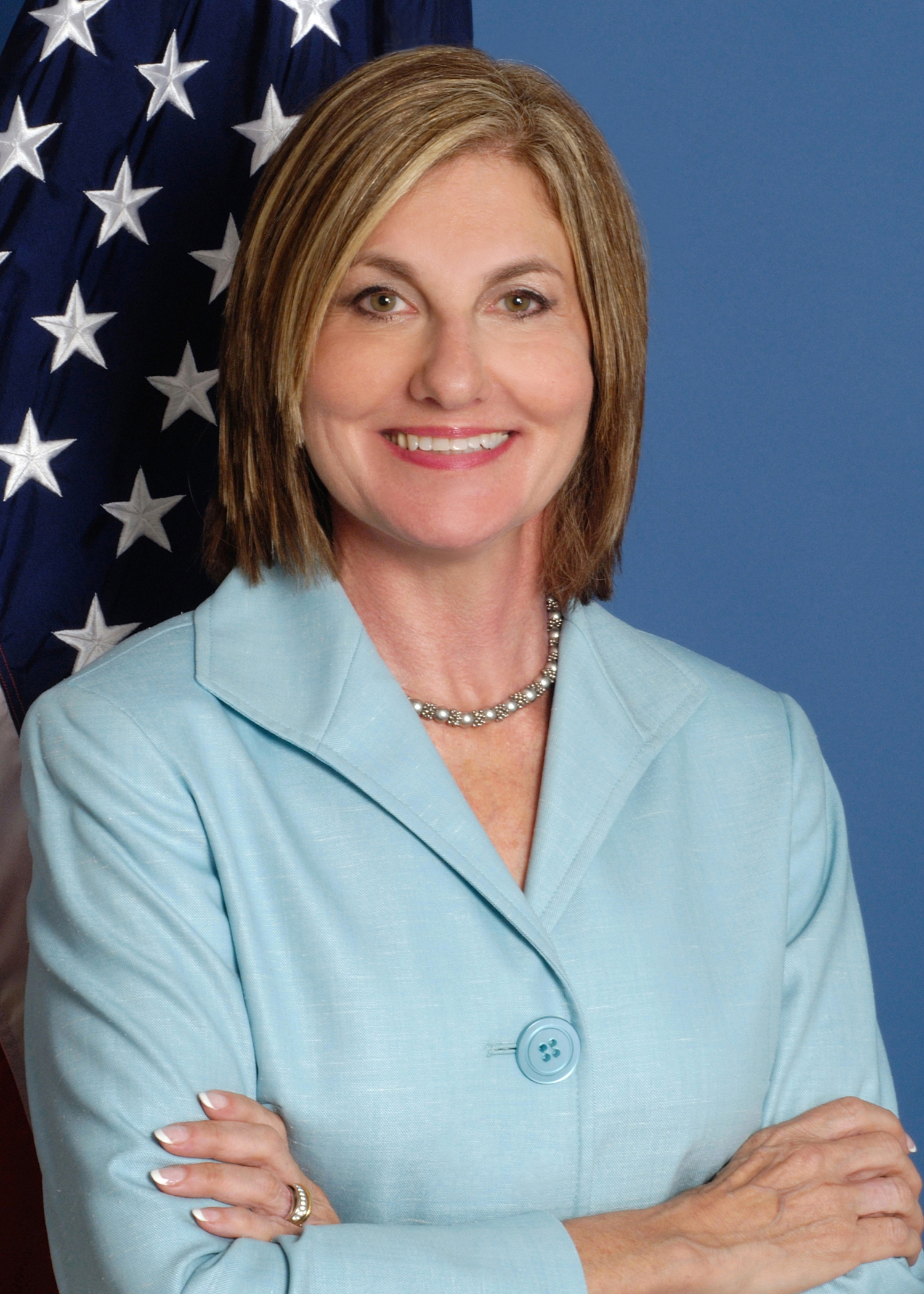

Chairwoman of the National Credit Union Administration
- In office August 24, 2009 – April 30, 2016
- Preceded by: Michael E. Fryzel
- Succeeded by: Rick Metsger

Personal details
- Born: August 25, 1950 (age 76) New York City, New York
- Spouse: Marshall Matz
- Children: Two
- Education: Cornell University; George Washington University

Deborah "Debbie" Matz (born August 25, 1950) is an American civil servant who served as the 8th Chairman of the National Credit Union Administration.

== Early life and career ==
Matz was born in New York City on August 25, 1950. Matz has a B.S. from Cornell University and a Master of Arts from George Washington University. She began her career working for the United States Department of Housing and Urban Development in New York and then served as a staffer for Congressman Peter A. Peyser (D-NY). Three years later, she took a position with the Office of Technology Assessment in which she served briefly. She then began one of two tenures with the United States Congressional Joint Economic Committee. During the Clinton Administration, she was a presidential appointee in the Senior Executive Service. After Bill Clinton left office in 2001, she joined the United Nations Food and Agriculture Organization as executive officer of the Washington D.C. liaison office.

== NCUA Board Member ==
At the recommendation of then-Senate Majority Leader Tom Daschle, President George W. Bush nominated Matz to her first term on the NCUA board. Before the U.S. Senate confirmed her nomination on March 22, 2002, she served as a recess appointee. Matz served as an NCUA board member from January 2002, to October 2005.

During her first term, Matz initiated a series of workshops called Partnering and Leadership Successes (PALS) to encourage credit unions to reach out to consumers in their field of membership who were underserved by federally insured depository institutions or who relied upon non-traditional lenders to meet their cash needs.

Matz also helped restructure NCUA's operations to create the Office of Small Credit Union Initiatives. This specialized office, which provides free consulting, training, and grants, is intended to helping small, low-income credit unions.

Matz cast the lone vote against a final rule to modify the regulations governing corporate credit unions in 2002. Matz raised concerns about the rule's inadequate risk concentration limits and the overly broad and permissive investment authority.

During the 2008 financial crisis, five corporate credit unions that had purchased high concentrations of faulty mortgage-backed securities faltered and were ultimately liquidated by NCUA. In one of her early acts as NCUA chairman, Matz developed revised rules to strengthen the governance and operations of corporate credit unions.

== NCUA Chairmanship ==
Between her terms on the NCUA, she was the executive vice-president and chief operating officer of Andrews Federal Credit Union, an $800 million federal credit union and served on President Obama's Economic Transition Team.

President Obama nominated Matz on June 1, 2009, to serve a six-year term on NCUA's board and selected her as NCUA's board chairman. After the U.S. Senate confirmation, Matz took the oath of office on August 24, 2009. Her term expired April 10, 2015, and she served until April 30, 2016. She was succeeded as NCUA Board chairman by Rick Metsger; who joined the NCUA Board in August 2013.

=== Response to the 2008 financial crisis ===
In her first year as NCUA chairman, the nation's credit union industry faced unprecedented threats to its stability. Many of the largest corporate credit unions had invested in private-label, mortgage-backed securities that experienced dramatic, unprecedented declines in value, effectively rendering five of these wholesale institutions insolvent. The losses to the U.S. credit union system exceeded $40 billion.

Matz announced NCUA's Corporate System Resolution program on September 24, 2010. As part of the program, the agency created the NCUA Guaranteed Notes (NGN) program to provide long-term funding for distressed investment securities (legacy assets) from the failed corporates. NGN trusts, guaranteed by the full faith and credit of the U.S. Government, issued $28.3 billion in securities backed by the cash flows from the legacy assets. As a result of this program, losses from the corporate failures to the broader credit union system were significantly reduced.

Under Matz's leadership, NCUA also rewrote the regulation governing corporate credit unions. This new rule restricts the types of investments that can be made, limits concentration of certain investments, raises capital requirements, and strengthens governance standards.

Matz has worked to hold accountable the parties that sold the faulty mortgage-backed securities that caused the corporate credit union crisis. The Board filed its first two lawsuits against securities underwriters in 2011. Shortly thereafter, the Board filed another seven lawsuits against various Wall Street securities firms. The Board, as liquidating agent, also filed 13 more lawsuits against securities firms and banks, alleging violations of federal and state securities laws and of federal and state antitrust laws based on manipulation of the London Interbank Offered Rate. The Board also filed four lawsuits against banks for failing to fulfill their duties as trustees for certain residential mortgage-backed securities trusts. Since 2011, NCUA has recovered more than $4.3 billion in settlements. Net proceeds from these settlements reduce the amount of assessments charged by NCUA to all federally insured credit unions to repay the losses from the five failed corporate credit unions.

NCUA's Corporate System Resolution program ensured that credit unions recovered from the crisis without any interruption in payment services, any loss of insured funds, or any direct costs to taxpayers.

The retail credit unions serving consumers were also under enormous stress when Matz became NCUA chairman. In an effort to stem the tide of federally insured credit union failures, Matz instituted more frequent examinations and strengthened enforcement actions at credit unions where warranted.

As a result of effective regulation, the improving economy, and prudent credit union management, all key safety and soundness indicators have improved markedly during Matz's tenure as board chairman. By 2013, the credit union industry's return on average assets rebounded to 0.85 percent from 0.18 percent in 2009. The industry's aggregate net worth ratio climbed to 10.5 percent, the highest level since 2008. Net loan charge-offs were reduced by more than half, to 0.58 percent from 1.21 percent in 2009.

=== Post-crisis career ===
After the 2008 financial crisis, Matz spearheaded the adoption of policies to keep pace with the evolving credit union system. Matz in 2011 launched a Regulatory Modernization Initiative consistent with President Obama's Executive Order 13579. Over five years, the initiative yielded 22 areas of regulatory relief.

Matz also led efforts to create NCUA's Office of National Examinations and Supervision with responsibility for supervising federally insured credit unions with more than $10 billion in assets and all corporate credit unions. The realignment addresses growing concentrations of assets in larger, more complex credit unions and seeks to protect the NCUSIF from losses.

To make NCUA an employer of choice, Matz instituted new personnel policies and employee outreach programs. As a result of these changes, in December 2012 the Partnership for Public Service's Best Places to Work in the Federal Government ranked NCUA as the most improved mid-sized agency in the federal government.

=== Financial Stability Oversight Council (FSOC) ===
As NCUA board chairman, Matz served as one of ten voting members on the Financial Stability Oversight Council. Matz also represented NCUA on the Federal Financial Institutions Examination Council, which she chaired for two years starting in April 2011, and as vice chairman on the board of NeighborWorks America. Created by the Dodd-Frank Wall Street Reform and Consumer Protection Act of 2010, FSOC identifies risks between 2010 and 2016 to the financial stability of the United States, promotes market discipline, and responds to emerging risks between 2010 and 2016 to the stability of the United States' financial system.

=== Federal Financial Institutions Examination Council ===
In April 2011, Matz succeeded Sheila C. Bair, former chairman of the Federal Deposit Insurance Corporation, as Federal Financial Institutions Examination Council (FFIEC) chairman. Matz's ascension marked the first time in more than 20 years that NCUA chaired this interagency body. At the start of Matz's two-year term, all FFIEC members were banking regulators. As required by the Dodd-Frank Act, Matz worked to integrate the Consumer Financial Protection Bureau into FFIEC's operations. Under Matz's leadership, FFIEC also issued best practices and guidance on interest rate risk, outsourced cloud computing, and real estate appraisals.

Matz also directed FFIEC's Appraisal Subcommittee to develop a timely new resource for consumers: the Appraisal Complaint National Hotline. The hotline includes a website and a toll-free call center to ensure that appraisal complaints are routed quickly to the federal or state agency that can best address each issue.

Comptroller of the Currency Thomas J. Curry succeeded Matz as FFIEC chairman in April 2013. Matz continued to serve on FFIEC until her departure from federal service in April 2016.

== Post-NCUA ==
Since June 2019, she has served on the board of directors of Stewart Title Co. She is on both the audit and nominating and corporate governance committees. In November 2016, she was elected to the board of the Mutual of Omaha Bank, where she was vice chairman of the Risk and Compliance Committee and a member of the Audit Committee. In addition, she is on the advisory board of Elphi, a start-up offering a new loan origination platform to help expedite the mortgage loan approval process.

Preceded by Michael E. Fryzel	Chairman, National Credit Union Administration Board; August 24, 2009 – April 30, 2016	Succeeded by Rick Metsger
