= Rodney E. Hood =

11th Board Chairman of the NCUA

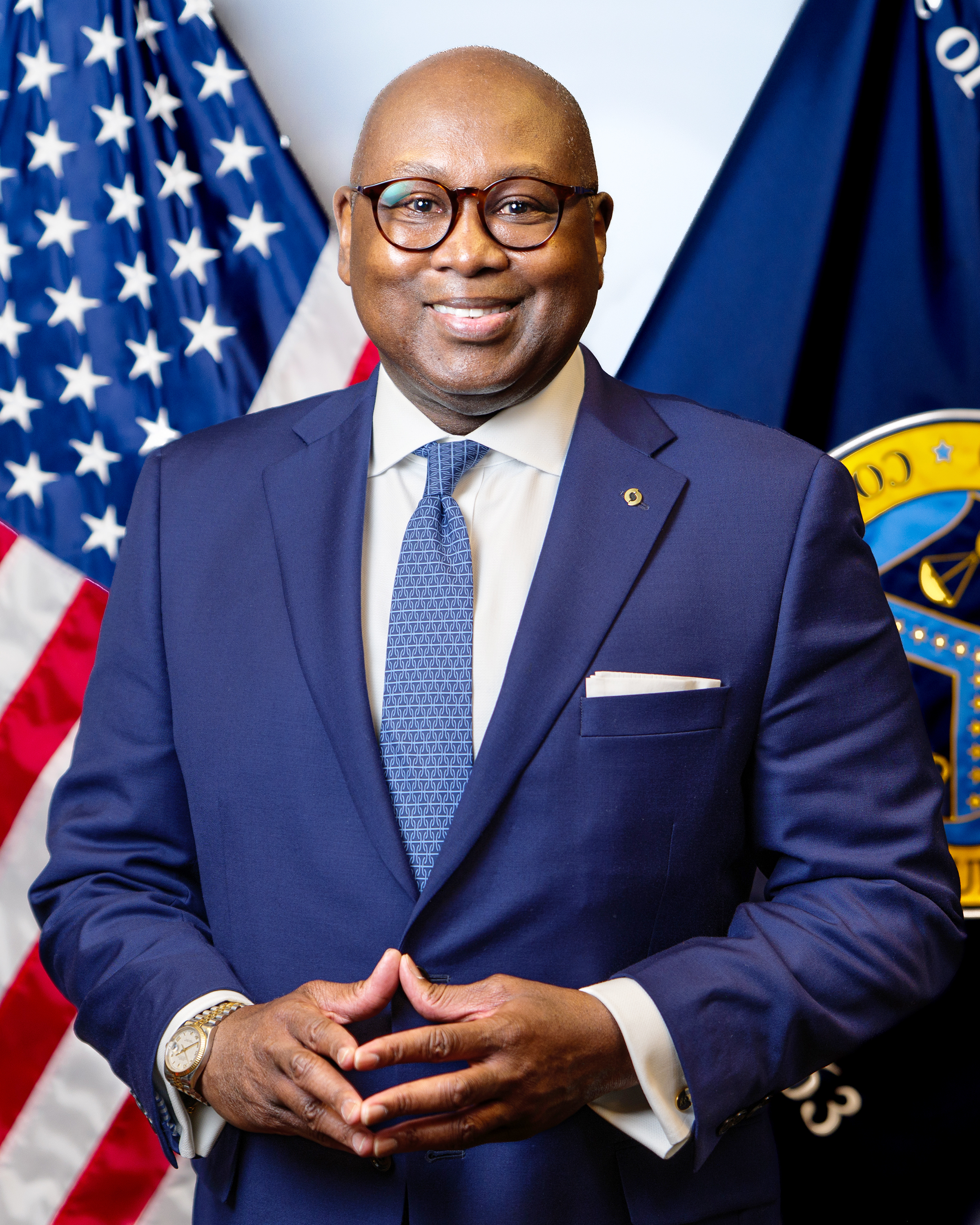

Acting Comptroller of the Currency
- In office February 10, 2025 – July 15, 2025
- President: Donald Trump
- Preceded by: Michael J. Hsu (acting)
- Succeeded by: Jonathan V. Gould

First Deputy Comptroller
- In office February 10, 2025 – September 3, 2025
- President: Donald Trump
- Preceded by: Michael J. Hsu

Chairman of the National Credit Union Administration
- In office April 8, 2019 – January 20, 2021
- President: Donald Trump
- Preceded by: J. Mark McWatters
- Succeeded by: Todd Harper

Board Member of the National Credit Union Administration
- In office March 14, 2019 – January 24, 2024
- President: Donald Trump
- In office November 2005 – August 2009
- President: George W. Bush
- Succeeded by: Tanya Otsuka

Personal details
- Born: February 22, 1967 (age 59) Charlotte, North Carolina
- Party: Republican
- Education: University of North Carolina at Chapel Hill (BS)

Rodney E. Hood is an American government official who served as the Acting Comptroller of the Currency and a director of the Federal Deposit Insurance Corporation. He served twice on the National Credit Union Administration board and was its eleventh chairman from 2019 to 2021. He has experience in retail and commercial banking, affordable housing, and community development. He is the first African-American to lead a banking regulator.

== Government ==
From 2003 until 2005, Hood served as associate administrator of the Rural Housing Service at the U.S. Department of Agriculture.

=== National Credit Union Administration ===
Hood was appointed to the NCUA board by President George W. Bush and served from November 2005 until August 2009. He was appointed vice chairman and served as the NCUA's representative on the board of NeighborWorks America.

Hood was again nominated to the board of the National Credit Union Administration (NCUA) on January 19, 2019, by President Donald Trump. The senate confirmed his appointment on March 14, 2019. He took the oath of office on April 8, 2019. This appointment made Hood the first African-American head of a federal banking regulatory agency.

Hood became chairman of the NCUA board upon his swearing-in on April 8, 2019. He served as chairman until January 20, 2021, when President Joe Biden appointed Todd Harper to the position. As chairman, Hood served as a voting member of the Financial Stability Oversight Council. He also represented the NCUA on the Financial and Banking Information Infrastructure Committee and as vice chairman of the Federal Financial Institutions Examination Council. Hood continued his service on the board after being succeeded by Todd Harper as chairman in 2021. He left the board in January 2024.

During his service on the NCUA board, Hood was a proponent of fintech and artificial intelligence in finance. Hood also supported the formation of new credit unions.

Hood is a supporter of financial inclusion. He has called it the "civil rights issue of our time." Hood has supported regulatory changes to better serve the underbanked.

In early 2020, the NCUA changed its nonmember deposit rule to allow credit unions to have public unit and nonmember shares totaling up to the greater of 50% of net paid-in and unimpaired capital and surplus or $3 million. This rule change significantly improved the liquidity of credit unions.

Under Hood, the NCUA changed its low-income designation rule to include military personnel in 2020. This change gave members of the armed forces a status similar to that of students pursuing tertiary education. This in turn made it easier to qualify for low-income credit union (LICU) status. Being designated an LICU has benefits including exemption from the statutory cap on member business lending, eligibility for grants and loans from the Community Development Revolving Loan Fund, the ability to accept deposits from non-members, and increased access to capital. The banking industry was critical of this change.

In 2021, Hood supported the NCUA’s liberalization and streamlining of its derivative rule. This change was designed to make it easier for credit unions to manage interest rate risk.

In 2022, Hood supported the NCUA’s reform of its rule on subordinated debt. The rule change counted secondary capital as subordinated debt. It also increased the number of credit unions allowed to use subordinated debt to calculate their risk-based capital and net worth. Under the new rule, all LICUs, complex credit unions, and newly established credit unions were permitted to issue subordinated debt subject to regulatory approval.

=== Office of the Comptroller of the Currency ===
On February 7, 2025, Hood was made the Acting Comptroller of the Currency by operation of law after being appointed First Deputy Comptroller by Scott Bessent, the Secretary of the Treasury, in place of Michael J. Hsu. By virtue of holding this position, Hood serves as an ex officio director of the Federal Deposit Insurance Corporation.

Immediately after assuming office, Hood removed the Office of the Comptroller of the Currency (OCC) from the Network of Central Banks and Supervisors for Greening the Financial System. He issued a statement saying this action was taken because climate change did not fall within the statutory responsibilities of his agency.

At Hood's direction, the OCC issued Interpretive Letter 1183 to affirm that a wide range of cryptocurrency activities are legally permissible for nationally chartered banks and other financial institutions. The letter specifically addressed custody of cryptocurrencies and participating in independent node verification networks such as distributed ledgers. The letter also ended the requirement for OCC-supervised entities to receive regulatory pre-clearance for such activities. Hood also expressed support for regulatory sandboxes for banks and fintech firms.

== Private sector ==
Prior to his government work, Hood worked for Bank of America as a Community Reinvestment Act officer. He later held positions at North Carolina Mutual Life Insurance Company as marketing director and group sales manager. Hood also served as national director of the Emerging Markets Group for Wells Fargo Home Mortgage and served on the board of the Wells Fargo Housing Foundation.

Hood next worked as a corporate responsibility manager for JPMorgan Chase. He managed relationships with non-profits, financial regulators, and community leaders in service of greater inclusion of underserved communities and ethnic minorities.

In 2024, Hood was named to the board of Zest AI. Later that year, Hood was appointed to the boards of Posh AI, the fintech firm ModernFi, and DefenseStorm.

Hood served on the international advisory board of Strategic Resource Management from 2024 to 2025.

== Non-profit work ==
Hood worked as a missionary in Africa.

Hood has worked with the University of North Carolina in various capacities including being a member of the Board of Governors of the UNC System, the Board of Visitors of UNC at Chapel Hill, and the Board of Trustees for the UNC School of Arts.

Hood served on the board of the North Carolina Museum of Art.

Hood served as chairman of the board of NeighborWorks America from 2021 to 2024.

== Awards ==
Hood was named one of the “40 Young Leaders Under the Age of 40” by the Triangle Business Journal.

Hood was given the Wells Fargo Housing Foundation's "Dream Award" for showing a commitment to affordable housing.

In 2023, Hood was inducted into the African American Credit Union Hall of Fame.

Hood received the Distinguished Alumnus Award from the University of North Carolina at Chapel Hill in 2021.

== Education ==
Hood obtained an undergraduate degree in business, communications, and political science from the University of North Carolina at Chapel Hill.

| Preceded by J. Mark McWatters | Chairman, National Credit Union Administration Board; April 8, 2019 – 2021 | Succeeded by Todd Harper |
