= Bank regulation in the United States =

Multi-organization regulatory bodies

Bank regulation in the United States is highly fragmented compared with other G10 countries, where most countries have only one bank regulator. In the U.S., banking is regulated at both the federal and state level. Depending on the type of charter a banking organization has and on its organizational structure, it may be subject to numerous federal and state banking regulations. Apart from the bank regulatory agencies the U.S. maintains separate securities, commodities, and insurance regulatory agencies at the federal and state level, unlike Japan and the United Kingdom (where regulatory authority over the banking, securities and insurance industries is combined into one single financial-service agency). Bank examiners are generally employed to supervise banks and to ensure compliance with regulations.

U.S. banking regulation addresses privacy, disclosure, fraud prevention, anti-money laundering, anti-terrorism, anti-usury lending, and the promotion of lending to lower-income populations. Some individual cities also enact their own financial regulation laws (for example, defining what constitutes usurious lending).

== Regulatory authority ==
A bank's primary federal regulator could be the Federal Deposit Insurance Corporation (FDIC), the Federal Reserve Board, or the Office of the Comptroller of the Currency. Within the Federal Reserve System are 12 districts centered around 12 regional Federal Reserve Banks, each of which carries out the Federal Reserve Board's regulatory responsibilities in its respective district. Credit unions are subject to most bank regulations and are supervised by the National Credit Union Administration. The Financial Institutions Regulatory and Interest Rate Control Act of 1978 established the Federal Financial Institutions Examination Council (FFIEC) with uniform principles, standards, and report forms for the other agencies.

State regulation of state-chartered banks and certain non-bank affiliates of federally chartered banks applies in addition to federal regulation. State-chartered banks are subject to the regulation of the state regulatory agency of the state in which they were chartered. For example, a California state bank that is not a member of the Federal Reserve System would be regulated by both the California Department of Financial Institutions and the FDIC. Likewise, a Nevada state bank that is a member of the Federal Reserve System would be jointly regulated by the Nevada Division of Financial Institutions and the Federal Reserve.

By statute, and in accordance with judicial interpretation of statutes and the United States Constitution, federal banking statutes (and the regulations and other guidance issued by federal banking regulatory agencies) often preempt state laws regulating certain activities of nationally chartered banking institutions and their subsidiaries. Specific exceptions to the general rule of federal preemption exist such as some contract law, escheat law, and insurance law.

One example is the Office of Thrift Supervision preempting federal savings associations from certain state laws. 12 U.S.C. § 1464(n) authorizes fiduciary activities for federal savings associations, and specifies certain state law requirements that are applicable to federal savings associations. 12 C.F.R. §550.136(c) lists six types of state laws that, in certain specified circumstances, are not preempted with respect to federal savings associations.

In the banking and financial services industry, two significant regulators are the Office of the Comptroller of the Currency and the Consumer Financial Protection Bureau.

== Privacy ==
Regulation P governs the use of a customer's private data. Banks and other financial institutions must inform a consumer of their policy regarding personal information, and must provide an "opt-out" before disclosing data to a non-affiliated third party. The regulation was enacted in 1999.

Concerning know your customer rules and Bank Secrecy Act regulations, financial institutions are encouraged to keep track of customers employment status and other business dealings, including whether or not the financial activity of customers are consistent with their business activities, and report on customers' suspect activities to the government.

== Anti-money laundering and anti-terrorism ==
At its core, financial transparency requires financial institutions to implement certain basic controls:

- they must know who their customers are (so-called know your customer rules);
- they must understand their customers' normal and expected transactions;
- and they must keep the necessary records and make the necessary reports on their customers.

The Bank Secrecy Act of 1970 (BSA), also known as the Currency and Foreign Transactions Reporting Act, is a U.S. law requiring financial institutions in the United States to assist U.S. government agencies in detecting and preventing money laundering. Specifically, the act requires financial institutions to keep records of cash purchases of negotiable instruments, file reports of cash transactions exceeding $10,000 (daily aggregate amount), and to report suspicious activity that might signify money laundering, tax evasion or other criminal activities.

Section 326 of the USA PATRIOT Act allows financial institutions to place limits on new accounts until the account holder's identity has been verified.

Office of Foreign Assets Control (OFAC) sanctions apply to all U.S. entities including banks. The FFIEC provides guidelines to financial regulators for verifying compliance with the sanctions.

== Community reinvestment ==
The Community Reinvestment Act of 1977 requires insured depository institutions to reinvest in the communities they serve. There should be an emphasis on low-income and moderate-income (LMI) census tracts and individuals. Insured depository institutions must display a CRA notice, and each branch must have a current CRA public file or access to it via the company's intranet, and must provide the information in person or by mail.

== Deposit account regulation ==
=== Deposit insurance ===
The United States was the second country (after Czechoslovakia) to officially enact deposit insurance to protect depositors from losses by insolvent banks. In 1933 the Glass–Steagall Act established the Federal Deposit Insurance Corporation (FDIC) to insure deposits at commercial banks.

In 1970 Congress established a separate fund for credit unions, the National Credit Union Share Insurance Fund. The NCUSIF insures all federally chartered credit unions and many state-chartered credit unions (98% as of 2009). Some others are insured by the private guaranty corporation American Share Insurance (156 as of 2009). In 1978 foreign banks operating in the United States were required to hold the same level of reserves under the specifications of the International Banking Act.

In 1934, Congress created the Federal Savings and Loan Insurance Corporation to insure savings and loan deposits. In the 1980s, during the savings and loan crisis, the FSLIC became insolvent and was abolished; its responsibility was transferred to the FDIC.

Some financial institutions offer insurance in excess of FDIC or NCUA limits. For example, the Depositors Insurance Fund insures excess deposits at Massachusetts-chartered savings banks. American Share Insurance provides excess share insurance at participating credit unions.

=== Consumer protection ===
The Truth in Savings Act (TISA), implemented by Regulation DD, established uniformity in disclosing terms and conditions regarding interest and fees when giving out information and when opening a new savings account. On passing the law in 1991, Congress noted it would help promote economic stability, competition between depository institutions, and allow the consumer to make informed decisions.

The Expedited Funds Availability Act (EFAA) of 1987, implemented by Regulation CC, defines when standard holds and exception holds can be placed on checks deposited to checking accounts, and the maximum length of time the money can be held. A bank's hold policy can be less stringent than the guidelines provided, but it cannot exceed the guidelines.

The Electronic Fund Transfer Act of 1978, implemented by Regulation E, established the rights and liabilities of consumers as well as the responsibilities of all participants in electronic funds transfer activities.

=== Withdrawal limits and reserve requirements ===
- Establishes reserve requirement guidelines
- Regulates certain early withdrawals from certificate of deposit accounts
- Defines what qualifies as DDA/NOW accounts. See Regulation Q for eligibility rules for interest-bearing checking accounts
- Defines limitations on certain withdrawals on savings and money market accounts
  - Unlimited transfers or withdrawals if made in person, by ATM, by mail, or by messenger
  - In all other instances, there is a limit of six transfers or withdrawals. No more than three of these transactions may be made payable to a third party (by check, draft, point-of-sale, etc.)
  - Some banks will charge a fee with each excess transaction
  - Bank must close accounts where this transaction limit is constantly exceeded

=== Interest on demand deposits ===
Until 2011, Regulation Q prohibited banks from paying interest on demand deposit accounts. A "demand deposit" account includes many, but not all checking accounts, and does not include Negotiable Order of Withdrawal accounts (NOW accounts).

== Lending regulation ==
=== Consumer protection ===
The Home Mortgage Disclosure Act (HMDA) of 1975, implemented by Regulation C, requires financial institutions to maintain and annually disclose data about home purchases, home purchase pre-approvals, home improvement, and refinance applications involving one- to four-unit and multifamily dwellings. It also requires branches and loan centers to display a HMDA poster.

The Equal Credit Opportunity Act (ECOA) of 1974, implemented by Regulation B, requires creditors which regularly extend credit to customers—including banks, retailers, finance companies, and bank-card companies—to evaluate candidates on creditworthiness alone, rather than other factors such as race, color, religion, national origin, or sex. Discrimination based on marital status, receipt of public assistance, and age is generally prohibited (with exceptions), as is discrimination based on a consumer's good-faith exercise of his or her credit-protection rights.

The Truth in Lending Act (TILA) of 1968, implemented by Regulation Z, promotes the informed use of consumer credit by standardizing the disclosure of interest rates and other costs associated with borrowing. TILA also gives consumers the right to cancel certain credit transactions involving a lien on the consumer's principal dwelling, regulates certain credit-card practices, and provides a means of resolving credit-billing disputes.

==== Debt collection ====
The Fair Credit Reporting Act (FCRA) of 1970 regulates the collection, sharing, and use of customer-credit information. The act allows consumers to obtain a copy of their credit report from credit bureaus that hold information on them, provides for consumers to dispute negative information held and sets time limits, after which negative information is suppressed. It requires that consumers be informed when negative information is added to their credit records, and when adverse action is taken based on a credit report.

==== Credit cards ====
Provisions addressing credit-card practices aim to enhance protections for consumers who use credit cards and improve credit-card disclosure under the Truth in Lending Act:

- Banks would be prohibited from increasing the rate on a pre-existing credit card balance (except under limited circumstances) and must allow the consumer to pay off that balance over a reasonable period of time
- Banks would be prohibited from applying payments in excess of the minimum in a manner that maximizes interest charges
- Banks would be required to give consumers the full benefit of discounted promotional rates on credit cards by applying payments in excess of the minimum to any higher-rate balances first, and by providing a grace period for purchases where the consumer is otherwise eligible
- Banks would be prohibited from imposing interest charges using the "two-cycle" method, which computes interest on balances on days in billing cycles preceding the most recent billing cycle
- Banks would be required to provide consumers a reasonable amount of time to make payments

=== Lending limits ===
Lending-limit regulations restrict the total amount of loans and credits that a bank may extend to a single borrower. This restriction is usually stated as a percentage of the bank's capital or assets. For example, a national bank generally must limit its total outstanding loans and credits to any single borrower to no more than 15% of the bank's total capital and surplus. Some state banking regulations also contain similar lending limits applicable to state-chartered banks. Both federal and state laws generally allow for a higher lending limit (up to 25% of capital and surplus for national banks) when the portion of the credit that exceeds the initial lending limit is fully secured.

Loans to Insiders (Regulation O) establishes various quantitative and qualitative limits and reporting requirements on extensions of credit made by a bank to its "insiders" or the insiders of the bank's affiliates. The term "insiders" includes executive officers, directors, principal shareholders and the related interests of such parties.

== Central banking regulation ==
Extensions of Credit by Federal Reserve Banks (Regulation A) establishes rules regarding discount window lending, the extension of credit by the Federal Reserve Bank to banks and other institutions. The Federal Reserve Board made significant amendments to Regulation A in 2003, including amendments to price certain discount-window lending at above-market rates and to restrict borrowing to banks in generally sound condition. In amending the regulation, the Federal Reserve Board noted that many banks had expressed their unwillingness to use discount-window borrowing because their use of such a funding source was interpreted as sign of the bank's financial weakness or distress. The Federal Reserve Board indicated its hope that the 2003 amendments would make discount window lending a more attractive funding option to banks.

== Regulation of bank affiliates and holding companies ==
Transactions Between Member Banks and Their Affiliates (Regulation W) regulates transactions, such as loans and asset purchases between banks and their affiliates. The term "affiliate" is broadly defined and includes parent companies, companies that share a parent company with the bank, companies that are under other types of common control with the bank (e.g. by a trust), companies with interlocking directors (a majority of directors, trustees, etc. are the same as a majority of the bank's), subsidiaries, and certain other types of companies. When passed September 18, 1950 Regulation W included a prohibition on installment purchases exceeding 21 months, which was shortened to 15 months on October 16 of the same year.

== 2018 deregulation announcement ==
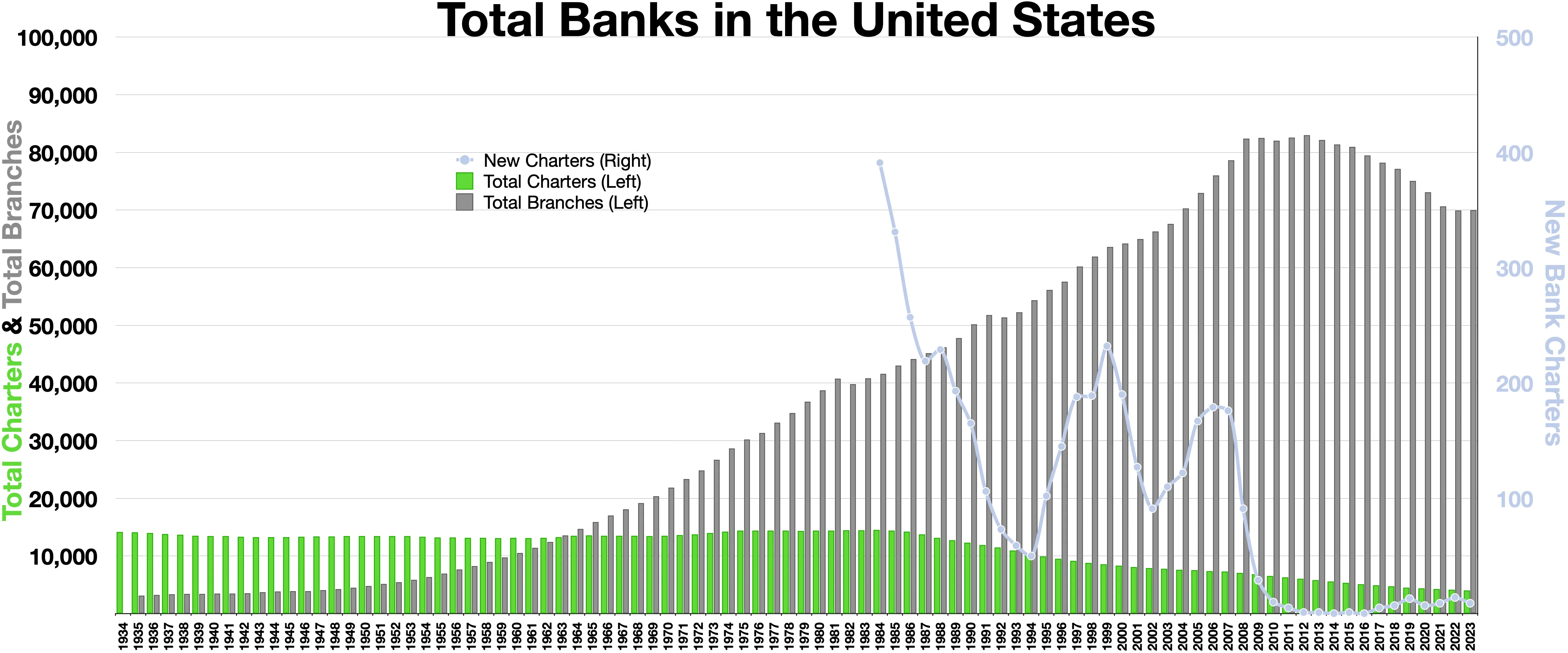
Total banks in the United States New chartered banks (right) Total Charters (left) Total branches (left)

In January 2018, a spokesperson for the Federal Reserve Board chief of supervision said that existing banking sector regulations were too tough and standardized, and could be relaxed and customized in order to promote commercial bank lending, investment, and stock market trading. Randal Quarles, the Vice Chairman for Bank Supervision, said he was planning several imminent changes that Wall Street has wanted involving capital rules, proprietary trading and a process known as “living wills” that aims to prevent taxpayer bailouts.

== See also ==
- Bank regulation
- Financial privacy laws in the United States

== Notes ==
- Board of Governors of the Federal Reserve System.
