= MRIA =

MRIA may refer to:

== Sciences, Humanities and Social Sciences ==
- Member of the Royal Irish Academy, a title awarded as public recognition of academic excellence.

== Transportation ==
- Mattala Rajapaksa International Airport, an international airport serving the city of Hambantota in southeast Sri Lanka.

== Finance ==
- Matter(s) Requiring Immediate Attention, a type of regulatory finding issued by members of the FFIEC
