= Unfair or Deceptive Acts or Practices =

Proposal for bank regulation in the United States

Unfair, Deceptive, or Abusive Acts or Practices (UDAAP) is a proposal for bank regulation in the United States under Federal Reserve Regulation AA. The Board of Governors of the Federal Reserve System announced in a press release on Saturday, May 2, 2008, that the proposed rules, "prohibit unfair practices regarding credit cards and overdraft services that would, among other provisions, protect consumers from unexpected increases in the rate charged on pre-existing credit card balances." Provisions addressing credit card practices aim to enhance protections for consumers who use credit cards and improve the credit card disclosures under the Truth in Lending Act:

- Banks would be prohibited from increasing the rate on a pre-existing credit card balance (except under limited circumstances) and must allow the consumer to pay off that balance over a reasonable period.
- Banks would be prohibited from applying payments in excess of the minimum in a manner that maximizes interest charges.
- Banks would be required to give consumers the full benefit of discounted promotional rates on credit cards by applying payments in excess of the minimum to any higher-rate balances first, and by providing a grace period for purchases where the consumer is otherwise eligible.
- Banks would be prohibited from imposing interest charges using the "two-cycle" method, which computes interest on balances on days in billing cycles preceding the most recent billing cycle.
- Banks would be required to provide consumers a reasonable amount of time to make payments.

The proposal would also address subprime credit cards by limiting the fees that reduce the available credit. In addition, banks that make firm offers of credit advertising multiple rates or credit limits would be required to disclose in the solicitation the factors that determine whether a consumer will qualify for the lowest rate and highest credit limit. The proposal has been placed in the Federal Register.

== Withdrawal and subsequent developments ==
This 2008 regulatory proposal under Regulation AA was not finalized and was ultimately withdrawn. It was replaced by final regulations that the Federal Reserve Board issued to regulate practices under Regulation Z (Truth in Lending Act) for credit card practices and Regulation E (Electronic Fund Transfer Act) for deposit account overdrafts stemming from debit card and ATM card transactions. The Congress also addressed these practices in the Credit CARD Act of 2009, which was also implemented by the Federal Reserve under Regulation Z.
