= Systemically important financial market utility =

Systemically important financial market utilities (SIFMUs) are entities whose failure or disruption could threaten the stability of the United States financial system. To date eight entities in the U.S. have been officially designated SIFMUs.

== Legislative background ==
Section 804 of the Dodd–Frank Wall Street Reform and Consumer Protection Act (DFA) provides the Financial Stability Oversight Council (FSOC) the authority to designate a financial market utility (FMU) that it determines is or is likely to become systemically important because the failure of or a disruption to the functioning of the FMU could create, or increase, the risk of significant liquidity or credit problems spreading among financial institutions or markets and thereby threaten the stability of the United States financial system.

== Implications ==
SIFMU status places an entity under enhanced regulatory oversight by the three agencies charged with regulating SIFMUs—the Federal Reserve Board, Securities and Exchange Commission(SEC), and the Commodity Futures Trading Commission (CFTC).

On October 28, 2014, the Federal Reserve Board finalized its revisions to the SIFMU risk management standards. The final rule expands the implications for SIFMUs and includes:

- Heightened standards for boards of directors;
- Comprehensive risk management framework expectations;
- Expanded recovery and resolution plan requirements;
- Rules and procedures requirements for liquidity shortfalls;
- Broader risk management requirements; and
- Enhanced disclosure requirements for financial market infrastructures.

== List of SIFMUs ==
As of January 2015, the Financial Stability Oversight Council has designated eight companies as SIFMUs. The first two are regulated by the Federal Reserve Board, the next two by the CFTC, and the remaining four by the SEC; the last three are all subsidiaries of the Depository Trust & Clearing Corporation (DTCC), a U.S. post-trade financial services company providing clearing and settlement services.

1. The Clearing House Payments Company – "on the basis of its role as operator of the Clearing House Interbank Payments System" (CHIPS)
2. CLS Bank International – world's largest multicurrency cash settlement system
3. Chicago Mercantile Exchange – subsidiary of the CME Group, the world's largest futures exchange
4. ICE Clear Credit – subsidiary of IntercontinentalExchange (ICE), the second largest futures exchange after CME
5. Options Clearing Corporation
6. Depository Trust Company – subsidiary of Depository Trust & Clearing Corporation (DTCC)
7. Fixed Income Clearing Corporation – DTCC subsidiary
8. National Securities Clearing Corporation - DTCC subsidiary

== See also ==
- Dodd–Frank Wall Street Reform and Consumer Protection Act
- Financial Stability Oversight Council (FSOC)
- Systemic risk
- Systemically important financial institution (SIFI)
- Systemically Important Payment Systems
