= Kyle S. Hauptman =

NCUA Chairman

Kyle Hauptman
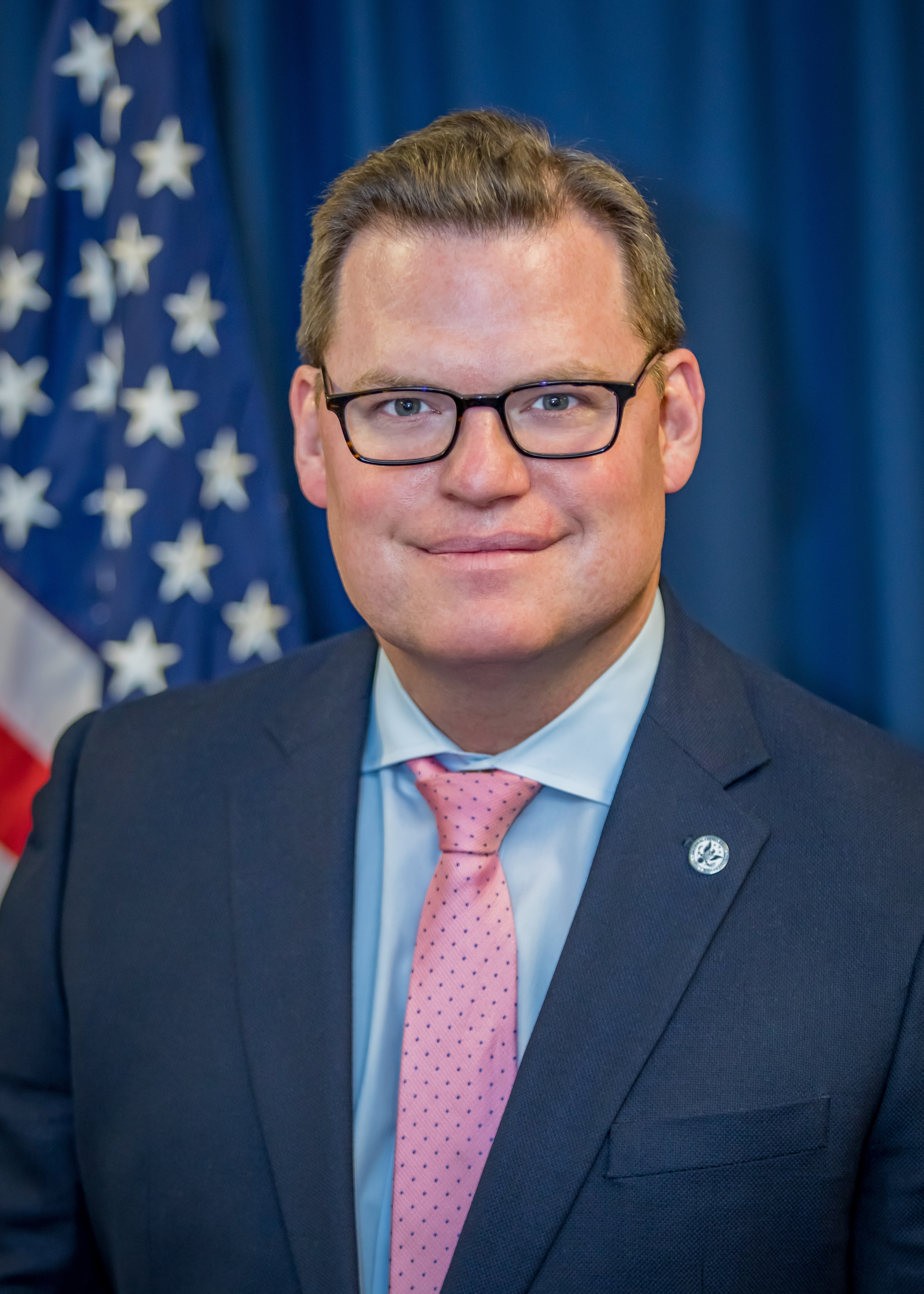

Chair of the National Credit Union Administration
- In office January 20, 2025 – August 10, 2026
- President: Donald Trump
- Preceded by: Todd M. Harper
- Succeeded by: John Crews

Vice Chair of the National Credit Union Administration
- In office December 18, 2020 – January 20, 2025
- President: Donald Trump; Joe Biden
- Preceded by: J. Mark McWatters

Personal details
- Born: December 13, 1973 (age 52) Bar Harbor, Maine, U.S.
- Party: Republican
- Education: University of California, Los Angeles (BA); Columbia University (MBA)

Kyle S. Hauptman (born December 13, 1973) was the thirteenth Chairman of the National Credit Union Administration (NCUA). Hauptman was designated Chairman by President Donald Trump on January 20, 2025. Before his designation as Chairman, Mr. Hauptman served as Vice Chairman of the NCUA since December 18, 2020.

Hauptman was nominated to serve on the NCUA Board on June 15, 2020, by President Donald Trump. The US Senate voted to confirm his appointment on December 2, 2020, and he was sworn in as a member of the NCUA Board on December 14, 2020. The NCUA Board approved Hauptman's designation as Vice Chairman of the NCUA on December 18, 2020.

As NCUA Board Chairman, Hauptman serves as a voting member of the Financial Stability Oversight Council (FSOC) and represents the NCUA on the Federal Financial Institutions Examination Council (FFIEC).

== Early life and education ==
Hauptman is from Bar Harbor, Maine. His father was the former superintendent of Acadia National Park. He is a New England Patriots fan.

Hauptman holds a Master's in Business Administration from Columbia Business School and a Bachelor of Arts from University of California, Los Angeles. He received a certificate in Economics of Blockchain and Digital Assets from the Wharton School of the University of Pennsylvania.

== Career ==
Prior to his public service career, Hauptman was Senior Vice President at Jefferies & Co where he traded US Treasuries and futures, managing a multi-million dollar trading book. Previously, Hauptman worked at Lehman Brothers as a bond trader in their New York City, Tokyo, and Sydney offices until the company collapsed during the 2008 financial crisis.

Hauptman then served as policy consultant for the National Republican Senatorial Committee, as senior development manager at the American Enterprise Institute, and as Executive Director of the Main Street Growth Project, an advocacy group focused on protecting everyday Americans and small businesses from becoming caught in the crossfire of the effort to "reform Wall Street."

Prior to joining the NCUA Board, Hauptman was appointed by the Securities and Exchange Commission Chair to a two-year term as a voting member of the Advisory Committee on Small and Emerging Companies. Hauptman also served on President Donald Trump's transition team in 2016.

Hauptman left the SEC committee in 2017 to serve as Senator Tom Cotton's (R-Arkansas) advisor on economic policy, as well as Staff Director of the Senate Banking Committee's Subcommittee on Economic Policy.

Throughout his career, he has been a frequent speaker on financial policy issues. Hauptman has delivered guest lectures at Columbia Business School, NYU Law School, the University of Mississippi School of Law, and the University of Alabama's Culverhouse College of Business.

=== NCUA ===
In December 2020, the Senate voted 56 to 39 to confirm Kyle Hauptman to the National Credit Union Administration Board. The Senate Banking Committee held the nomination hearing remotely over video due to the COVID-19 pandemic.

Former Senate Banking Committee Chairman Mike Crapo (R-Idaho) said that Mr. Hauptman was "well prepared to join the NCUA Board based on his prior experience" in the financial sector and for having worked on S. 2155, the Economic Growth, Regulatory Relief, and Consumer Protection Act. Hauptman's former boss Senator Tom Cotton (R-Arkansas) said, "I voted to confirm Kyle with enthusiasm. My enthusiasm is mixed with sadness to see a close and trusted aid go, but my loss will be America's gain. The NCUA, American taxpayers, and millions of people who rely on credit unions will be well-served by Kyle, who brings to the job a collegial spirit and rare knowledge of financial markets."

In December 2021, under Hauptman's leadership, NCUA issued new guidance providing clarity that credit unions could partner with third-party digital asset service providers. On May 25, 2022, NCUA issued another piece of guidance allowing credit unions to use distributed ledger technologies (DLT). Hauptman remarked, "We [America] can win the blockchain economy as well — we just need some clarity from the government. I'm proud that the NCUA is doing its small part."

Hauptman was designated as the thirteenth Chairman of the NCUA by President Donald Trump on January 20, 2025.

=== SEC / PCAOB ===
On January 30, 2026, Securities and Exchange Commission's Paul S. Atkins announced the appointment of Kyle Hauptman as a Board member of the Public Company Accounting Oversight Board (PCAOB). Hauptman will serve a term ending October 24, 2029. “I am grateful to President Donald J. Trump and Chairman Paul S. Atkins for their faith in me and for the appointment to the PCAOB,” said Chairman Hauptman. “I intend to remain in my role as NCUA Chairman until my successor is appointed by President Trump and confirmed by the U.S. Senate.”
