= Fryzel =

Fryzel is a surname. Notable people with the surname include:

- Dennis Fryzel (1942–2009), American football coach
- Jimmy Fryzel (born 1981), American football player
- Michael E. Fryzel (fl. 2008), American attorney and government official
