= ICE Clear Credit =

ICE Clear Credit LLC, a Delaware limited liability company, is a Derivatives Clearing Organisation (DCO) previously known as ICE Trust US LLC which was launched in March 2009. ICE offers trade execution and processing for the credit derivatives markets through Creditex and clearing through ICE Trust™. ICE Clear Credit LLC operates as a central counterparty (CCP) and clearinghouse for credit default swap (CDS) transactions conducted by its participants. ICE Clear Credit LLC is a subsidiary of IntercontinentalExchange (ICE). ICE Clear Credit LLC is a wholly owned subsidiary of ICE US Holding Company LP (ICE LP) which is "organized under the law of the Cayman Islands but has consented to the jurisdiction of United States courts and government agencies with respect to matters arising out of federal banking laws."

== History ==
In 2009 ICE Trust became a New York chartered bank for purposes of Federal Reserve Act and was therefore eligible for membership in the Federal Reserve System.

By 2010, Intercontinental Exchange had cleared more than $10 trillion in credit default swaps (CDS) (Terhune Bloomberg Business Week 2010-07-29) through its subsidiaries, ICE Trust CDS (now ICE Clear Credit) in March 2009 and at ICE Clear Europe in July 2009 in New York, launched in 2008, (which also handles soft commodity futures/options) and ICE Clear Europe Limited in London, UK, launched in July 2009, (which also trades in energy futures) clearing entities for credit default swaps (CDS)(Terhune Bloomberg Business Week 2010-07-29). (Note: Intercontinental Exchange's closest rival as credit default swaps (CDS) clearing houses, CME Group (CME) cleared $192 million in comparison to ICE's $10 trillion (Terhune Bloomberg Business Week 2010-07-29).) (CME Group comprises the Chicago Board of Trade and the Chicago Mercantile Exchange, the New York Mercantile Exchange and New York Commodities Exchange). Bloomberg's Terhune (2010) explained how investors seeking high-margin returns use Credit Default Swaps (CDS) to bet against financial instruments owned by other companies and countries. Intercontinental's clearing houses guarantee every transaction between buyer and seller providing a much-needed safety net reducing the impact of a default by spreading the risk. ICE collects on every trade.(Terhune Bloomberg Business Week 2010-07-29). Brookings senior research fellow, Robert E. Litan, cautioned however, "valuable pricing data will not be fully reported, leaving ICE's institutional partners with a huge informational advantage over other traders. He calls ICE Trust [now ICE Clear Credit] "a derivatives dealers' club" in which members make money at the expense of nonmembers (Terhune citing Litan in Bloomberg Business Week 2010-07-29). (Litan Derivatives Dealers’ Club 2010)." Actually, Litan conceded that "some limited progress toward central clearing of CDS has been made in recent months, with CDS contracts between dealers now being cleared centrally primarily through one clearinghouse (ICE Trust) [ICE Trust [now ICE Clear Credit] in which the dealers have a significant financial interest (Litan 2010:6)." However, "as long as ICE Trust [now ICE Clear Credit] has a monopoly in clearing, watch for the dealers to limit the expansion of the products that are centrally cleared, and to create barriers to electronic trading and smaller dealers making competitive markets in cleared products (Litan 2010:8)."

The U.S. Securities and Exchange Commission granted an exemption for IntercontinentalExchange to begin guaranteeing credit-default swaps. The SEC exemption represented the last regulatory approval needed by Atlanta-based Intercontinental. Its larger competitor, CME Group Inc., hasn't received an SEC exemption, and agency spokesman John Nester said he didn't know when a decision would be made.

On March 4, 2009, ICE announced that ICE US Trust, LLC (ICE Trust), a New York limited liability trust company, received regulatory approval from the Board of Governors of the Federal Reserve System to become a member of the Federal Reserve System and to serve as a clearing house and central counterparty for credit default swap (CDS) transactions, initially for North American CDS indexes and later adding liquid single-name swaps. Now known as ICE Clear Credit LLC it is subject to direct regulation and supervision by the CFTC and the SEC.

Also in March 2009 ICE acquired The Clearing Corporation (TCC). This acquisition provided the risk management framework, operational processing and clearing infrastructure for CDS clearing. ICE paid TCC's cash on hand at the close, $39 million more in cash and gave profit participation of less than 35% of the total to be paid to the 10 initial clearing members of TCC.

ICE Clear Credit LLC received temporary no-action assurances from CFTC to exempt ICE swap market participants from various requirements under the Commodity Exchange Act (CEA), that would otherwise apply to certain swap transactions as a result Dodd-Frank Wall Street Reform and Consumer Protection Act. The exemption was based on the premise that the Dodd-Frank Act reflected an "underlying policy to facilitate the central clearing of CDS transactions to reduce systemic risk in the global financial markets, while also minimizing unnecessary disruption and costs to the markets."

In an article published in the New York Times (December 11, 2010) Louise Story argued that members of ICE Clear Credit LLC powerful risk committee drawn from banks like Deutsche Bank, JPMorgan Chase, Goldman Sachs and Morgan Stanley, "helps oversee trading in derivatives ... [and also] share a common goal: to protect the interests of big banks in the vast market for derivatives, one of the most profitable — and controversial — fields in finance," a system with "costly implications" for customers and smaller banks. "The marketplace as it functions now 'adds up to higher costs to all Americans,' said Gary Gensler, the chairman of the Commodity Futures Trading Commission, which regulates most derivatives. More oversight of the banks in this market is needed, he said." In the same month, ICE said it was "well positioned" to establish a Swap Execution Facility (SEF), having met with Commissioner Gensler or his staff four times in the past year to discuss SEF registration. An SEF or multiple SEFs will be the derivatives-trading platform(s) newly required under Dodd-Frank financial-markets reform. Other firms said to be looking at becoming SEFs were Bloomberg LP, Thomson TradeWeb, Parity Energy, and MarketAxess. In a call with investors on November 1, CEO Sprecher had discussed the company's position in and preparation across its numerous markets, including the prospects for SEFs.

On July 16, 2011, ICE Trust U.S. changed its name to ICE Clear Credit. At that time it registered with the Commodity Futures Trading Commission as a Derivatives Clearing Organization and with the Securities and Exchange Commission as a Securities Clearing Agency.

== Regulatory Oversight ==
ICE Trust "is overseen by the Federal Reserve Board and members may include banks or other institutions that fulfill the membership requirements, which include net worth of at least $5 billion as well as a credit rating of A or better." ICE is controlled indirectly by Intercontinental-Exchange, Inc. (ICE) ICE's wholly owned subsidiary, ICE US Holding Company GP LLC (ICE GP), a Delaware limited liability company, is the general partner of ICE LP. ICE, ICE GP, and. "ICE LP is organized under the law of the Cayman Islands but has consented to the jurisdiction of United States courts and government agencies with respect to matters arising out of federal banking laws."

"[R]egulators increasingly regard clearing houses as central to financial stability (Hosking and Griffiths 2012)." On July 19, 2012, The Financial Stability Oversight Council designated ICE Clear Credit LLC as a Systemically important financial market utility (FMU). (Note: The Dodd-Frank Wall Street Reform and Consumer Protection Act (the Payment, Clearing and Settlement Supervision Act of 2010) mitigate financial risk in the financial system and promoting financial stability by giving the Board of Governors of the Federal Reserve authority to set risk management standards for entities that have been designated as Systemically Important Financial Market Utilities (FMU) by the Financial Stability Oversight Council (FSOC). On July 18, 2012 FSOC designated the eight entities as being systemically important utilities: ICE Clear Credit LLC, The Clearing House Payments Company, L.L.C., on the basis of its role as operator of the Clearing House Interbank Payments System, CLS Bank International, Chicago Mercantile Exchange, Inc., The Depository Trust Company, Fixed Income Clearing Corporation, National Securities Clearing Corporation, The Options Clearing Corporation. It under the FDIC's resolution authority where these entities can be placed into receivership and wound-up by the FDIC rather than reorganizing or liquidating under the supervision of a bankruptcy court.) ICE Clear Credit waived the right to appeal. This subjects this entity to enhanced regulatory oversight. "One of the concerns raised by regulatory bodies is the concentration of CDS trading in only a few dealer institutions in recent years. (Note that the top 10 global banks are involved in 70% of all credit derivatives transactions.) Over time, the use of clearinghouses such as ICE Trust [ICE Clear Credit LLC since July 16, 2011] is expected to reduce the volume of settlement payments among members of the clearinghouse and, in theory, reduce counterparty credit risks that arise under CDS. However, trading CDS through clearinghouses may not effectively address concentration risk given that, at least initially, the clearinghouse members will be the major dealers currently involved in most trades. In order to address counterparty risk, members must provide collateral to ICE Trust [ICE Clear Credit LLC since July 16, 2011] to cover their obligations under cleared CDS. Members must also make initial and ongoing contributions to a guaranty fund that can be used by ICE Trust in the event of a member default (Forrester et al 2009)."

ICE Clear Credit LLC is regulated by the Commodity Futures Trading Commission (CFTC) as a Derivatives Clearing Organization (DCO) and by the Securities and Exchange Commission (SEC) as a Securities Clearing Agency (SCA).

On July 19, 2012, The Financial Stability Oversight Council designated ICE Clear Credit LLC as a Systemically important financial market utility (FMU). (Note: The Dodd-Frank Wall Street Reform and Consumer Protection Act (the Payment, Clearing and Settlement Supervision Act of 2010) mitigate financial risk in the financial system and promoting financial stability by giving the Board of Governors of the Federal Reserve authority to set risk management standards for entities that have been designated as Systemically Important Financial Market Utilities (FMU) by the Financial Stability Oversight Council (FSOC). On July 18, 2012 FSOC designated the eight entities as being systemically important utilities: ICE Clear Credit LLC, The Clearing House Payments Company, L.L.C., on the basis of its role as operator of the Clearing House Interbank Payments System, CLS Bank International, Chicago Mercantile Exchange, Inc., The Depository Trust Company, Fixed Income Clearing Corporation, National Securities Clearing Corporation, The Options Clearing Corporation. It under the FDIC's resolution authority where these entities can be placed into receivership and wound-up by the FDIC rather than reorganizing or liquidating under the supervision of a bankruptcy court.) ICE Clear Credit waived the right to appeal. This subjects this entity to enhanced regulatory oversight.

== See also ==
- Central Counterparty Clearing
- Credit derivatives
- International Swaps and Derivatives Association
- Swap (finance)
