= International Banking Act of 1978 =

The Creating International Banking Act of 1978 was a United States legislative act that brought all American branches of foreign banks and agencies under the jurisdiction of U.S. banking regulations. It granted FDIC insurance to these domestic branches, but also required them to hold the same reserves and auditing schedules as U.S. banks.

Prior to this act, foreign banks operating in the U.S. were subject to varying state laws with no uniformity. Thus for the benefit of both U.S. regulators and foreign institutions seeking uniformity and stability, this act was approved. This act required foreign banks to apply for charters and approvals to operate within the United States from the Federal Reserve. Once approved, they next must meet the required reserve ratios with FDIC standards and are subject to US accounting and regulatory standards. This act allows foreign banks to establish branches within the United States that operate lawfully and under the same rules as domestic banks.
