= MetLife Inc. v. Financial Stability Oversight Council =

- Court: United States District Court for the District of Columbia
- Full case name: MetLife Inc. v. Financial Stability Oversight Council
- Docket nos.: 1:15-cv-00045
- Citation: 177 F. Supp. 3d 219

Case history
- Subsequent actions: Motion to unseal denied, 2016 WL 3024015 (D.D.C. May 25, 2016); reversed and remanded, 865 F.3d 661 (D.C. Cir. 2017).

Court membership
- Judge sitting: Rosemary M. Collyer

MetLife Inc. v. Financial Stability Oversight Council, 177 F. Supp. 3d 219 (D.D.C. 2016), is a case that challenged the systemically important financial institution, or SIFI rules in Dodd-Frank. U.S. District Judge Rosemary Collyer ruled that MetLife could shed its SIFI designation, after concluding Financial Stability Oversight Council, or FSOC's designation was "arbitrary and capricious". FSOC subsequently launched an appeal but decided to settle the case in January 2018 during the Trump administration, ensuring that MetLife would not face stricter rules. This had the effect of releasing nearly all non-bank SIFI organizations that were under Dodd-Frank at the time, prior to the deregulation of Prudential Financial.
