= Economic Growth and Regulatory Paperwork Reduction Act =

The Economic Growth and Regulatory Paperwork Reduction Act of 1996 or EGRPRA (passed as part of Omnibus Consolidated Appropriations Act of 1997 Pub. L. 104–208 (text) (PDF)) is a United States federal law that requires the Federal Financial Institutions Examination Council and its member agencies to review their regulations at least once every 10 years to identify any outdated, unnecessary or unduly burdensome regulatory requirements imposed on insured depository institutions.

The first EGRPRA review was completed with a report submitted to Congress in July 2007 and the second EGRPRA review was completed with a report submitted to Congress in March 2017.
