= Graduate School of International Business =

Moscow-based business school

The Graduate School of International Business (GSIB) of the Academy of National Economy under the Government of the Russian Federation is a Moscow-based graduate business school awarding MBA degrees. The school was founded in 1988 and was the first in Russia to start MBA programs in 1992. GSIB in 2010 had the largest MBA student body in Russia, accounting for 10% of all MBA students in the country. GSIB's dean is Leonid Evenko.

== MBA programs and accreditation ==
GSIB teaches all modes of MBA programs: full-time, part-time and modular. GSIB has national accreditation from the Russian Ministry of Education. It is internationally accredited by the London-based Association of MBAs (AMBA).
