= PaperWorks =

PaperWorks was a computer program introduced by Xerox Corporation in 1992, which allowed a business traveler to communicate with his or her personal computer while away from the office.

PaperWorks could be used to send and retrieve documents between the fixed computer system and the business traveler, by using fax machines.

The software created special machine-readable forms, similar to the type of forms used to score standardized tests. (Related topic: OMR)

The user would then fax the form back to the central computer, commanding one of several tasks to be performed. For example:

- the user could attach a document to the form which would be stored at the home office (for possible later processing), or
- the user could request that a particular document, stored on the computer's hard drive, be sent to the user.
- the user could request that a particular document be distributed to other users, also by fax.

The underlying technology for PaperWorks, called "DataGlyphs", was developed at Xerox PARC.
