= Financial Institutions Regulatory and Interest Rate Control Act of 1978 =

US federal law

- Long title: An act To extend the authority for the flexible regulation of interest rates on deposits and accounts in depository institutions.
- Enacted by: the 95th United States Congress

Citations
- Public law: Pub. L. 95–630
- Statutes at Large: 92 Stat. 3641

Legislative history
- Introduced in the House as H.R.14279 by Henry Reuss (D–WI) and Frank Annunzio (D–IL) on October 10, 1978; Committee consideration by House Committee on Banking, Currency, and Housing, Senate Committee on Banking, Housing and Urban Affairs; Passed the House on October 11, 1978; Passed the Senate on October 12, 1978; Agreed to by the House on October 14, 1978 and by the Senate on October 14, 1978; Signed into law by President Jimmy Carter on November 10, 1978

The Financial Institutions Regulatory and Interest Rate Control Act of 1978 is a United States federal law. Among other measures, it established the Federal Financial Institutions Examination Council (FFIEC, under Title X of the act) and authorized national security letters (NSLs, under the Right to Financial Privacy Act, Title XI of the act).
