= Systemically important financial institution =

Entity whose failure may trigger a crisis

A systemically important financial institution (SIFI) is a bank, insurance company, or other financial institution whose failure might trigger a financial crisis. They are colloquially referred to as "too big to fail".

As the 2008 financial crisis unfolded, the international community moved to protect the global financial system through preventing the failure of SIFIs, or, if one did fail, limiting the adverse effects of its failure. In November 2011, the Financial Stability Board (FSB) published a list of global systemically important financial institutions (G-SIFIs).

In November 2010, the Basel Committee on Banking Supervision (BCBS) introduced new guidance (known as Basel III) that specifically targets SIFIs. The focus of the Basel III guidance is to increase bank capital requirements and to introduce capital surcharges for G-SIFIs. However, some economists warned in 2012 that the tighter Basel III capital regulation, which is primarily based on risk-weighted assets, may further negatively affect the stability of the financial system.

The FSB and the BCBS develop international financial policies and standards, but their decisions do not have direct legal force. They do not establish laws, regulations or rules for any financial institution directly. They merely act in an advisory or guidance capacity when it comes to non G-SIFIs. It is up to each country's specific lawmakers and regulators to enact whatever portions of the recommendations they deem appropriate for their own domestic systemically important banks (D-SIBs) or national SIFIs (N-SIFIs). Each country's internal financial regulators make their own determination of what is a SIFI. Once those regulators make that determination, they may set specific laws, regulations and rules that would apply to those entities.

Virtually every SIFI operates at the top level as a holding company made up of numerous subsidiaries. It is not unusual for the subsidiaries to number in the hundreds. Even though the uppermost holding company is located in the home country, where it is subject, at that level, to that home regulator, the subsidiaries may be organized and operating in several different countries. Each subsidiary is then subject to potential regulation by every country where it actually conducts business.

At present (and for the likely foreseeable future) there is no such thing as a global regulator. Likewise there is no such thing as global insolvency, global bankruptcy, or the legal requirement for a global bail out. Each legal entity is treated separately. Each country is responsible (in theory) for containing a financial crisis that starts in their country from spreading across borders. Looking up from a country perspective as to what is a SIFI may be different than when looking down on the entire globe and attempting to determine what entities are significant. The FSB hired Mark Carney to write the report that coined the term G-SIFI for this reason in 2011.

== Definition ==
As of November 2011 when the G-SIFI paper was released by the FSB, a standard definition of N-SIFI had not been decided. However, the BCBS identified factors for assessing whether a financial institution is systemically important: its size, its complexity, its interconnectedness, the lack of readily available substitutes for the financial market infrastructure it provides, and its global (cross-jurisdictional) activity. In some cases, the assessments of experts, independent of the indicators, will be able to move an institution into the N-SIFI category or remove it from N-SIFI status.

== Banks ==
Global systemically important banks (G-SIBs) are assessed using five equally weighted categories: size, cross-jurisdictional activity, interconnectedness, substitutability/financial institution infrastructure, and complexity. The list of G-SIBs is published annually by the Financial Stability Board (FSB). G-SIBs are subject to a higher loss-absorbency requirement.

As of November 2025, the FSB updated the list of G-SIBs, and the following 29 major banks (or banking groups) were included (with 8 in the United States, 7 in the European Union, 5 in China, 3 in the United Kingdom, 3 in Japan, 2 in Canada and 1 in Switzerland):

- Agricultural Bank of China
- (United States) Bank of America
- Bank of China
- (China) Bank of Communications
- (United States) The Bank of New York Mellon
- (United Kingdom) Barclays
- (France) BNP Paribas
- China Construction Bank
- (United States) Citigroup Inc.
- (Germany) Deutsche Bank AG
- (United States) Goldman Sachs
- (France) Groupe BPCE
- (France) Groupe Crédit Agricole
- (United Kingdom) HSBC Holdings plc
- Industrial and Commercial Bank of China Limited
- (Netherlands) ING Group
- (United States) JPMorgan Chase
- (Japan) Mitsubishi UFJ Financial Group, Inc
- (Japan) Mizuho Financial Group, Inc.
- (United States) Morgan Stanley
- Royal Bank of Canada
- (Spain) Banco Santander, S.A.
- (France) Société Générale S.A.
- (United Kingdom) Standard Chartered plc
- (United States) State Street
- (Japan) SMBC Group
- (Canada) Toronto-Dominion Bank
- (Switzerland) UBS Group AG
- (United States) Wells Fargo

The following 8 banks were removed as a result of a decline in their global systemic importance:

- (Spain) Banco Bilbao Vizcaya Argentaria, S.A.
- (Germany) Commerzbank AG
- (Switzerland) Credit Suisse Group AG (acquired by UBS)
- (Belgium) (France) Dexia N.V./S.A. (undergoing an orderly resolution process)
- (United Kingdom) Lloyds Banking Group plc
- (United Kingdom) NatWest Group (previously named Royal Bank of Scotland Group)
- (Finland) Nordea Bank Abp
- (Italy) UniCredit S.p.A.

=== Asia ===
Banks in Japan deemed systemically important are stress tested by the International Monetary Fund (IMF). Banks in China are mostly state run and are stress tested by the national banking authority.

=== United States ===
==== Stress testing ====
In the United States, the largest banks are regulated by the Federal Reserve (FRB) and the Office of the Comptroller of the Currency (OCC). These regulators set the selection criteria, establish hypothetical adverse scenarios and oversee the annual tests. 19 banks operating in the U.S. (at the top tier) have been subject to such testing since 2009. Banks showing difficulty under the stress tests are required to postpone share buybacks, curtail dividend plans and if necessary raise additional capital financing.

==== G-SIB capital requirements ====
In December 2014, the Federal Reserve Board (FRB) issued a long-awaited proposal to impose additional capital requirements on the U.S.’s global systemically important banks (G-SIBs). The proposal implements the Basel Committee on Banking Supervision’s (BCBS) G-SIB capital surcharge framework that was finalized in 2011, but also proposes changes to BCBS’s calculation methodology resulting in significantly higher surcharges for US G-SIBs compared with their global peers. The proposal has not been finalized, and leading experts such a PwC believe it will be finalized in 2015.CN

The proposal, which industry experts expect will be finalized in 2015, requires U.S. G-SIBs to hold additional capital (Common Equity Tier 1 (CET1) as a percentage of risk-weighted assets (RWA)) equal to the greater of the amount calculated under two methods. The first method is consistent with BCBS’s framework, and calculates the amount of extra capital to be held based on the G-SIB’s size, interconnectedness, cross-jurisdictional activity, substitutability, and complexity. The second method is introduced by the U.S. proposal, and uses similar inputs but replaces the substitutability element with a measure based on a G-SIB’s reliance on short-term wholesale funding (STWF).

=== Market-based bank capital regulation ERNs ===
Stress testing has limited effectiveness in risk management. Dexia passed the European stress tests in 2011. Two months later it requested a €90 billion bailout guarantee.(Goldfield, Klemperer & Bulow 2013) Goldfield, a former Senior Partner of Goldman Sachs and Economics Professors, Jeremy Bulow at Stanford and Paul Klemperer at Oxford, argue that Equity Recourse Notes' (ERNs), similar in some ways to contingent convertible debt, (CoCos), should be used by all banks rated SIFI, to replace non-deposit existing unsecured debt. "ERNs would be long-term bonds with the feature that any interest or principal payable on a date when the stock price is lower than a pre-specified price would be paid in stock at that pre-specified price."(Goldfield, Klemperer & Bulow 2013) Through ERNs, distressed banks would have access to much-needed equity as willing investors purchase tranches of ERNs similar to pooling tranches of subprime mortgages. In this case, however, the market, not the public takes the risks. Banking can be pro-cyclical by contributing to booms and busts. Stressed banks become reluctant to lend since they are often unable to raise capital equity through new investors. (Goldfield, Klemperer & Bulow 2013) claim that ERNs would provide a "counterweight against pro-cyclicality".

==== Resolution plans ====
The Dodd–Frank Wall Street Reform and Consumer Protection Act requires that bank holding companies with total consolidated assets of $50 billion or more and nonbank financial companies designated by the Financial Stability Oversight Council for supervision by the Federal Reserve submit resolution plans annually to the Federal Reserve (FRB) and the Federal Deposit Insurance Corporation (FDIC). Each plan, commonly known as a living will, must describe the company's strategy for rapid and orderly resolution under the Bankruptcy Code in the event of material financial distress or failure of the company.

Starting in 2014, category 2 firms will be required to submit resolution plans while category 1 firms will submit their third resolution plans.

The resolution plan requirement under the Dodd Frank Act in Section 165(d), is in addition to the FDIC's requirement of a separate covered insured depository institution ("CIDI") plan for CIDIs of large bank holding companies. The FDIC requires a separate CIDI resolution plan for US insured depositories with assets of $50 billion or more. Most of the largest, most complex BHCs are subject to both rules, requiring them to file a 165(d) resolution plan for the BHC that includes the BHC’s core businesses and its most significant subsidiaries (i.e., “material entities”), as well as one or more CIDI plans depending on the number of US bank subsidiaries of the BHC that meet the $50 billion asset threshold. Similar to the assumptions made for resolution plans, the FDIC recently issued assumptions to be made in CIDI plans including the assumption that the CIDI will fail.

===== Qualified financial contracts =====
When a company enters insolvency (either through bankruptcy or FDIC receivership), an automatic stay is triggered that generally prohibits creditors and counterparties from terminating, offsetting against collateral, or taking any other mitigating action with respect to their outstanding contracts with the insolvent company. However, under US law counterparties to qualified financial contracts (QFCs) are exempt from this stay and may usually begin to exercise their contractual rights after the close of business the next day. In case of receivership, the FDIC must decide within this time period whether to transfer the QFC to another institution, retain the QFC and allow the counterparty to terminate it, or repudiate the QFC and pay out the counterparty.

In January 2015, the US Secretary of the Treasury issued a notice of proposed rulemaking (NPR) that would establish new recordkeeping requirements for QFCs. The NPR requires US systemically important financial institutions and certain of their affiliates to maintain specific information electronically on end-of-day QFC positions and to be able to provide this information to regulators within 24 hours if requested. The NPR is intended to help the FDIC with decision-making by making available detailed information on a failed company’s QFCs, given the FDIC’s expanded receivership powers under Dodd–Frank’s Orderly Liquidation Authority (OLA).

== Non-bank entities ==
The concept of a systemically important financial institution in the U.S. extends well beyond traditional banks and is often included under the term Non-banking financial company. It includes large hedge funds and traders, large insurance companies, and various and sundry systemically important financial market utilities. For historical background see Arguments for a systemic risk regulator.

Regarding which entities will be so designated the Dodd–Frank Act of 2010 contains the following in Title I—Financial Stability, Subtitle A—Financial Stability Oversight Council, Sec. 113. Authority to require supervision and regulation of certain nonbank financial companies (2) considerations:

- the extent of the leverage of the company;
- the extent and nature of the off-balance-sheet exposures of the company;
- the extent and nature of the transactions and relationships of the company with other significant nonbank financial companies and significant bank holding companies;
- the importance of the company as a source of credit for households, businesses, and State and local governments and as a source of liquidity for the United States financial system;
- the importance of the company as a source of credit for low-income, minority, or underserved communities, and the impact that the failure of such company would have on the availability of credit in such communities;
- the extent to which assets are managed rather than owned by the company, and the extent to which ownership of assets under management is diffuse;
- the nature, scope, size, scale, concentration, interconnectedness, and mix of the activities of the company;
- the degree to which the company is already regulated by 1 or more primary financial regulatory agencies;
- the amount and nature of the financial assets of the company;
- the amount and types of the liabilities of the company, including the degree of reliance on short-term funding; and
- any other risk-related factors that the Council deems appropriate.

FSOC subsequently issued clarification under Final Rule on Authority to Designate Financial Market Utilities as Systemically Important, which includes the following chart recasting the above statutory requirements into a six-category FSOC analytical framework including:

- size
- interconnectedness
- lack of substitutes
- leverage
- liquidity risk and maturity mismatch
- existing regulatory scrutiny

Statutory considerations:	Category or categories in which this consideration would be addressed:
(A) The extent of the leverage of the company	Leverage
(B) The extent and nature of the off-balance-sheet exposures of the company	Size; interconnectedness
(C) The extent and nature of the transactions and relationships of the company with other significant nonbank financial companies and significant bank holding companies	Interconnectedness
(D) The importance of the company as a source of credit for households, businesses, and State and local governments and as a source of liquidity for the United States financial system	Size; substitutability
(E) The importance of the company as a source of credit for low-income, minority, or underserved communities, and the impact that the failure of suchcompany would have on the availability of credit in such communities	Substitutability
(F) The extent to which assets are managed rather than owned by the company, and the extent to which ownership of assets under management is diffuse	Size; interconnectedness; substitutability
(G) The nature, scope, size, scale, concentration, interconnectedness, and mix of the activities of the company	Size; interconnectedness; substitutability
(H) The degree to which the company is already regulated by 1 or more primary financial regulatory agencies	Existing regulatory scrutiny
(I) The amount and nature of the financial assets of the company	Size; interconnectedness
(J) The amount and types of the liabilities of the company, including the degree of reliance on short- term funding	Liquidity risk and maturity mismatch; size; interconnectedness
(K) Any other risk-related factors that the Council deems appropriate	Appropriate category or categories based on the nature of the additional risk-related factor

The following are quotes from the FSOC final rule regarding each element of the six factor framework.

Interconnectedness Interconnectedness captures direct or indirect linkages between financial companies that may be conduits for the transmission of the effects resulting from a nonbank financial company's material financial distress or activities.

Substitutability Substitutability captures the extent to which other firms could provide similar financial services in a timely manner at a similar price and quantity if a nonbank financial company withdraws from a particular market. Substitutability also captures situations in which a nonbank financial company is the primary or dominant provider of services in a market that the Council determines to be essential to U.S. financial stability.

Size Size captures the amount of financial services or financial intermediation that a nonbank financial company provides. Size also may affect the extent to which the effects of a nonbank financial company's financial distress are transmitted to other firms and to the financial system.

Leverage Leverage captures a company's exposure or risk in relation to its equity capital. Leverage amplifies a company's risk of financial distress in two ways. First, by increasing a company's exposure relative to capital, leverage raises the likelihood that a company will suffer losses exceeding its capital. Second, by increasing the size of a company's liabilities, leverage raises a company's dependence on its creditors' willingness and ability to fund its balance sheet. Leverage can also amplify the impact of a company's distress on other companies, both directly, by increasing the amount of exposure that other firms have to the company, and indirectly, by increasing the size of any asset liquidation that the company is forced to undertake as it comes under financial pressure. Leverage can be measured by the ratio of assets to capital, but it can also be defined in terms of risk, as a measure of economic risk relative to capital. The latter measurement can better capture the effect of derivatives and other products with embedded leverage on the risk undertaken by a nonbank financial company.

Liquidity risk and maturity mismatch Liquidity risk generally refers to the risk that a company may not have sufficient funding to satisfy its short-term needs, either through its cash flows, maturing assets, or assets salable at prices equivalent to book value, or through its ability to access funding markets. For example, if a company holds assets that are illiquid or that are subject to significant decreases in market value during times of market stress, the company may be unable to liquidate its assets effectively in response to a loss of funding. In order to assess liquidity, the Council may examine a nonbank financial company's assets to determine if it possesses cash instruments or readily marketable securities, such as Treasury securities, which could reasonably be expected to have a liquid market in times of distress. The Council may also review a nonbank financial company's debt profile to determine if it has adequate long-term funding, or can otherwise mitigate liquidity risk. Liquidity problems also can arise from a company's inability to roll maturing debt or to satisfy margin calls, and from demands for additional collateral, depositor withdrawals, draws on committed lines, and other potential draws on liquidity.

A maturity mismatch generally refers to the difference between the maturities of a company's assets and liabilities. A maturity mismatch affects a company's ability to survive a period of stress that may limit its access to funding and to withstand shocks in the yield curve. For example, if a company relies on short-term funding to finance longer-term positions, it will be subject to significant refunding risk that may force it to sell assets at low market prices or potentially suffer through significant margin pressure. However, maturity mismatches are not confined to the use of short-term liabilities and can exist at any point in the maturity schedule of a nonbank financial company's assets and liabilities.

Existing regulatory scrutiny The Council will consider the extent to which nonbank financial companies are already subject to regulation, including the consistency of that regulation across nonbank financial companies within a sector, across different sectors, and providing similar services, and the statutory authority of those regulators.

=== Global systemically important insurers ===
- (Germany) Allianz
- (United States) AIG
- (Netherlands) Aegon
- (United Kingdom) Aviva
- (France) Axa
- (United States) MetLife
- (China) Ping An
- (United Kingdom) Prudential

Aegon replaced Assicurazioni Generali on the list in November 2015.

FSB plan to expand the above list also to include G-SII status for the world's largest reinsurers, pending a further development of the G-SII assessment methodology, to be finalized by IAIS in November 2015. The revised G-SII assessment methodology will be applied from 2016.

In October 2014, IAIS published the first-ever global insurance capital standard entitled Basic Capital Requirements (BCR), to apply to all group activities (incl. non-insurance activities) of G-SIIs, as a foundation for the higher loss absorbency (HLA) requirements. Beginning in 2015, the BCR ratio (Note: The BCR Ratio is calculated by dividing "Total Qualifying Capital Resources" by "Required Capital", both of which are initially derived from a comparable market adjusted valuation approach using current estimates of insurance liabilities - and both are determined on a consolidated group-wide basis for all financial and material non-financial activities (including all holding companies, insurance legal entities, banking legal entities and any other companies within the group). BCR Total Qualifying Capital Resources are classified as either core or additional capital. BCR Required Capital is determined by using a "factor-based" approach with 15 factors applying to defined segments and their specified exposure measures within the main categories of a G-SII’s activity - traditional life insurance, traditional non-life insurance, non-traditional insurance, assets and non-insurance.) will be reported on a confidential basis to group-wide supervisors - and be shared with the IAIS for purposes of refining the BCR as necessary. IAIS currently work to develop the methodology for the introduction of HLA requirements, to be published by end-2015, and to be applied starting from January 2019 towards those G-SIIs being identified in November 2017. From January 2019, all G-SIIs will be required to hold capital no lower than the BCR plus HLA. Subjecting insurers to enhanced supervisory oversight is not up to FSB/IAIS, but up to individual jurisdictions.

When MetLife—the United States’s largest life insurer—was designated as a systemically important institution in late 2014 by the Financial Stability Oversight Council (FSOC) which had been established by the Dodd–Frank Act, they challenged the designation as "arbitrary and capricious" in federal court and won. In April 2016 when judge Rosemary Collyer, found in favor of Metlife in a federal district court decision, the value of MetLife stocks rose sharply. On January 23, 2018 a panel of judges on the US Court of Appeals dropped the appeal after the Financial Stability Oversight Council dropped the appeal at the request of the Trump administration.

==== Americas ====
The U.S. government legislation defines the term financial market utilities (FMU) for other organizations that play a key part in financial markets such as clearing houses settlement systems. They are entities whose failure or disruption could threaten the stability of the financial system.

=== Asset managers ===
==== United States ====
In 2013, PricewaterhouseCoopers published a bulletin which predicted that the Financial Stability Oversight Council would eventually designate certain significant asset managers as nonbank systematically important financial institutions (nonbank SIFIs). The FSOC recently asked the U.S. Treasury Department’s Office of Financial Research (OFR) to undertake a study that provides data and analysis on the asset management industry. The study analyzed the industry and describes potential threats to U.S. financial stability from vulnerabilities of asset managers. The study suggested the industry’s activities as a whole make it systemically important and may pose a risk to financial stability. Furthermore, it identified the extent of assets managed by the major industry players. This request for the study is considered by some as a first step in by the FSOC in reviewing the industry and individual player to determine which are systematically important. Once designated as systematically important those entities will be subject to additional oversight and regulatory requirements.

In 2013, the Treasury Department's Office of Financial Research released its report on Asset Management and Financial Stability, the central conclusion was that the activities of the asset management industry as a whole make it systemically important and may pose a risk to US financial stability. Furthermore, in 2014 the Financial Stability Board and the International Organization of Securities Commissions issued the Consultative Document which proposed methodologies for identifying globally active systemically important investment funds. Both reports further the conclusion that it is likely the U.S. Financial Stability Oversight Council will designate a few large US asset managers as systemically important.

== See also ==
- International lender of last resort
- List of systemically important banks
- List of bank stress tests
- Federal Deposit Insurance Corporation#Resolution of insolvent banks
- Systemically important financial market utility
- Systemic risk
- Category:Systemic risk
- Too connected to fail
- MetLife Inc. v. Financial Stability Oversight Council
