= Michael E. Fryzel =

American lawyer

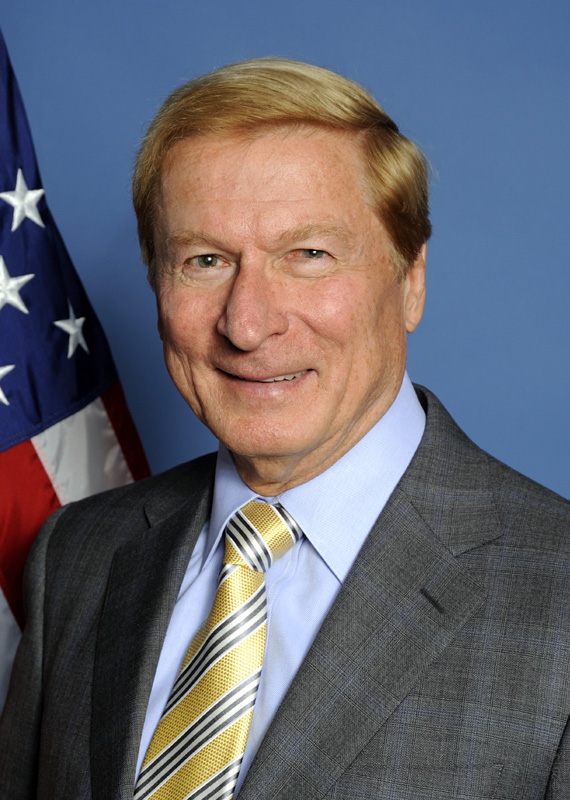
Michael E. Fryzel, Attorney, Financial Services Consultant

Michael E. Fryzel is an American attorney with offices in Chicago, Illinois. Following the 2016 general election, Fryzel served on President-elect Donald Trump's transition team and developed the Agency Action Plan for the National Credit Union Administration.

He served as Chairman of the National Credit Union Administration from 2008 - 2009. Fryzel was sworn in as the seventh Chairman of NCUA on July 29, 2008 and served in that position until August 24, 2009. From August 24, 2009 until August 26, 2014 he was a Board Member of the National Credit Union Administration, an independent federal agency that oversees the United States' credit union industry, which has more than $1 trillion in assets.

Fryzel was nominated by President George W. Bush in 2007. Prior to his NCUA service, Fryzel was an attorney in private practice specializing in financial, regulatory and real estate law. A former director of the Illinois Department of Financial Institutions, Fryzel served on the Illinois Governor's Board of Credit Union Advisors from 1992 until his NCUA appointment.

== Education ==
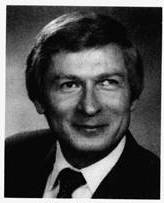
Fryzel, circa 1987

Fryzel holds a Bachelor of Science degree in Business Administration from Valparaiso University where he was a member of Sigma Pi fraternity. He also holds a Master of Business Administration degree from the University of Chicago Executive Program, and a Juris Doctor from Loyola University School of Law.

== NCUA Board Chairman (July 29, 2008 - August 23, 2009) ==
Immediately after being sworn in as Chairman of the NCUA Board, Fryzel was faced with the 2008 financial crisis. Fryzel was challenged with fixing the problems in the corporate credit union sector following the collapse of five of the largest corporate credit unions, costing the U.S. credit union system more than $12 billion through 2013. In addition, he was tasked with keeping the entire credit union system stable so that retail credit unions, and the nearly 88 million consumers they served at the time, would remain safe, sound and viable.

In response to the corporate crisis, Fryzel proposed the creation of the Temporary Corporate Credit Union Stabilization Fund to Congress to manage the costs of paying for the corporate credit union failures over time. Fryzel also addressed the severe liquidity challenges facing the credit union industry by requesting and receiving from Congress the authority to increase the borrowing authority of the Central Liquidity Facility from $1.5 billion to $41.5billion. Fryzel worked with staff to develop programs to stabilize the corporate system and prepare extensive contingency plans. In November 2008, Chairman Fryzel and the NCUA Board determined that extensions of credit by the Central Liquidity Facility (CLF) for "other than liquidity needs" were of national economic interest and obtained the concurrence of the Board of Governors of the Federal Reserve System and the Secretary of the Treasury to invoke NCUA's non-liquidity-needs lending authority through December 31, 2009. On December 9, 2008, Fryzel provided details on the Credit Union Homeowners Affordability Relief Program (CU HARP), unveiled in November, and a complementary program to provide contingent liquidity for the corporate credit union system, the Credit Union System Investment Program (CU SIP). These were new temporary initiatives for CLF extensions of credit to credit unions made to meet system liquidity needs.

Internally, Fryzel overhauled the agency's supervision of credit unions with a new hiring and training program for examiner staff. The new program required NCUA to contact all credit unions on a 12-month cycle to prevent the potential of additional losses to the system as a result of failing to find problems and put solutions in place sooner. As Chairman, Fryzel mandated the Federal Credit Union Act and all regulations be applied uniformly across all regional offices to ensure fair and consistent examination and supervision. In addition, he introduced the National Exam Team to focus on large, troubled credit unions due to their growing complexity and potential risk to the Share Insurance Fund. He also worked to increase NCUA examination staff levels to provide the required manpower to properly examine and regulate a financial network of 7,806 institutions holding more than $800 billion in assets at the time.

In June 2009, the Obama Administration issued a regulatory restructuring plan entitled Financial Regulatory Reform: A New Foundation. The creation of a new, independent agency devoted to consumer financial protection was a major aspect of the regulatory restructuring. A key reason cited for separating consumer protection from other supervision was the prudential financial institution regulators' "potentially conflicting mission to promote safe and sound banking practices."

Consistent with this philosophy, Fryzel worked with NCUA staff in designing the NCUA Office of Consumer Protection to segregate consumer compliance and consumer protection responsibilities from those involving safety and soundness Fryzel further saw the need to have a direct liaison between credit unions and the proposed Bureau of Consumer Protection in order to coordinate regulations and ensure an understanding of how credit unions function. The NCUA Board approved the funds to create the Office of Consumer Protection in November 2009 and the new office became fully functional in 2010.

== NCUA Board Member (July 29, 2008– August 26, 2014) ==
Michael E. Fryzel was appointed by President George W. Bush to a seat on the NCUA Board on November 30, 2007. He was confirmed by the U.S. Senate on June 26, 2008, and took the oath of office as NCUA Chairman on July 29, 2008. Fryzel served as NCUA Chairman for just over a year before assuming his seat as one of three voting members on the NCUA Board.

Serving as the agency liaison to the National Association of State Credit Union Supervisors (NASCUS), a professional regulators' association promoting the safety and soundness of state-charted credit unions, Board Member Fryzel worked with the association to keep state supervisors abreast of changing rules and policies at NCUA and to continue the strong working relationship between NCUA and state regulators. Having served as Director of the Illinois Department of Financial Institutions, whose responsibility included the regulation of state chartered credit unions, Fryzel utilized his understanding of the importance of state credit unions supervisors to work with NCUA to ensure an open line of communication existed between all parties and facilitate the sharing of best practices that would ensure effective regulation and supervision for the credit union industry. During his time on the NCUA Board, Fryzel encouraged a move toward less government and reduced regulations for credit unions across the country. As economic conditions improved, he vocalized for removal of the many stringent regulations placed on credit unions during the 2008 financial crisis.

== Prior Service ==
Prior to his NCUA appointment, Fryzel served in various capacities in Illinois state government. He was Director of the Illinois Department of Financial Institutions (DFI); Supervisor/Administrator of three of the four DFI divisions; Director of Administration and Fiscal Manager in the Governor's Office of Human Resources; Staff Assistant to the Illinois Speaker of the House and the House Minority Leader; DUI Prosecutor for the Illinois Secretary of State; Hearing Officer for the Illinois Motor Vehicle Review Board; and a Commissioner for the Illinois Court of Claims. He also served as Chairman and a Board Member of the Governor's Board of Credit Union Advisors for over 16 years during the administrations of three Illinois Governors.
