= Financial Stability Oversight Council =

United States systemic risk agency

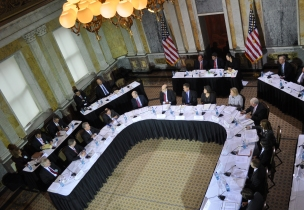
- 3rd FSOC Meeting (January 18, 2011)

Agency overview
- Formed: July 21, 2010
- Jurisdiction: United States Government
- Website: home.treasury.gov/policy-issues/financial-markets-financial-institutions-and-fiscal-service/fsoc

The Financial Stability Oversight Council (FSOC) is a United States federal government organization, established by Title I of the Dodd–Frank Wall Street Reform and Consumer Protection Act, which was signed into law by President Barack Obama on July 21, 2010. The Office of Financial Research is intended to provide support to the council.

The Dodd-Frank Act provides the Council with broad authorities to identify and monitor excessive risks to the U.S. financial system arising from the distress or failure of large, interconnected bank holding companies or non-bank financial companies, or from risks that could arise outside the financial system; to eliminate expectations that any American financial firm is "too big to fail"; and to respond to emerging threats to U.S. financial stability.

== Purpose and duties ==
At minimum, it must meet quarterly.

Specifically, there are three purposes assigned to the Council:

1. identify the risks to the financial stability of the United States from both financial and non-financial organizations;
2. promote market discipline, by eliminating expectations that the Government will shield them from losses in the event of failure; and
3. respond to emerging threats to the stability of the US financial system

== Activities ==
On July 26, 2011, the First Annual Financial Stability Oversight Council Report was issued by the Council fulfilling the Congressional mandate to report on the activities of the Council. The Report is intended to describe significant financial market and regulatory developments, analyze potential emerging threats, and make certain recommendations. The July 26, 2011 report warned that the United States faces potential losses connected with the European debt crisis.

In September 2014, a group of Republican lawmakers accused U.S. regulators of "disparate treatment" of nonbank financial firms currently considered for tougher oversight. The lawmakers stated that the regulators should conduct the same level of analysis and due diligence for the insurance industry as it has for the asset management industry before formally considering whether to designate another insurance company.

After much anticipation and debate about whether FSOC would and should designate individual asset managers (a nonbank financial firm) as systemically important financial institutions (SIFIs) which would subject them to greater oversight, FSOC announced in August, 2014, that rather than designating individual asset managers as SIFIs, it would focus on examining systemic risk posed by asset managers' products, and activities. As a result of FSOC's announcement the Securities and Exchange Commission is now expected and assumed to take a prudential supervisory role of individual asset managers, in addition to exercising its traditional mandate of investor protection.

Since the inception of FSOC, the Council has designated select financial market utilities (FMUs) as "systemically important." The designation of systemically important subjects the FMU to enhanced regulatory oversight. The three supervisory agencies charged with regulating systemically important FMUs are: the Federal Reserve Board, Securities and Exchange Commission, and Commodity Futures Trading Commission.

== Resources ==
The Federal Advisory Committee Act, which limits the powers of advisory committees, does not apply to the council. The council has an almost unlimited budget in that the Council may draw on virtually any resource of any department or agency of the federal government. Any employee of the federal government may be detailed to the Council without reimbursement and without interruption or loss of civil service status or privilege. Any member of the Council who is an employee of the federal government serves without additional compensation. In addition, "An employee of the Federal Government detailed to the Council shall report to and be subject to oversight by the Council during the assignment to the Council, and shall be compensated by the department or agency from which the employee was detailed." Additionally, "Any expenses of the Council shall be treated as expenses of, and paid by, the Office of Financial Research".

== Authority ==
The Council has very broad powers to monitor, investigate and assess any risks to the US financial system. The Council has the authority to collect information from any state or federal financial regulatory agency, and may direct the Office of Financial Research, which supports the work of the Council, "to collect information from bank holding companies and nonbank financial companies". The Council monitors domestic and international regulatory proposals, including insurance and accounting issues, and advises Congress and the Federal Reserve on ways to enhance the integrity, efficiency, competitiveness and stability of the US financial markets. On a regular basis, the Council is required to make a report to Congress describing the state of the U.S. financial system. Each voting member of the Council is required to either affirm that the federal government is taking all reasonable steps to assure financial stability and mitigate systemic risk, or describe additional steps that need to be taken. Under specific circumstances, the Chairman of the Council (who is also the Secretary of the Treasury), with the concurrence of 2/3 voting members, may place nonbank financial companies or domestic subsidiaries of international banks under the supervision of the Federal Reserve if it appears that these companies could pose a threat to the financial stability of the US. The Federal Reserve may promulgate safe harbor regulations to exempt certain types of foreign banks from regulation, with approval of the Council. Under certain circumstances, the Council may provide for more stringent regulation of a financial activity by issuing recommendations to the primary financial regulatory agency, which the primary financial agency is obliged to implement – the Council reports to Congress on the implementation or failure to implement such recommendations.

=== Financial reporting to the Council ===
The Council may require any bank or non-bank financial institution with assets over $50 billion to submit certified reports as to the company's:

- financial condition
- systems in place to monitor and control any risks
- transactions with subsidiaries that are regulated banks
- the extent to which any of the company's activities could have a potential disruptive impact on financial markets or the overall financial stability of the country

The Comptroller General of the United States may audit the Council or anyone working for the Council, and may have access to any information under the control of or used by the Council.

=== 2017 review ===
On April 21, 2017, President Donald Trump signed one Executive Order: 13789; and two Presidential memoranda: Orderly Liquidation Authority Review and Financial Stability Oversight Council to review the Council and parts of the Dodd–Frank Wall Street Reform and Consumer Protection Act.

== Organization ==
=== Voting members ===
The Financial Stability Oversight Council has ten voting members:

1. Secretary of the Treasury (chairs the Council)
2. Chairman of the Federal Reserve
3. Comptroller of the Currency
4. Director of the Consumer Financial Protection Bureau
5. Chairman of the U.S. Securities and Exchange Commission
6. Chairman of the Federal Deposit Insurance Corporation
7. Chairman of the Commodity Futures Trading Commission
8. Director of the Federal Housing Finance Agency
9. Chairman of the National Credit Union Administration Board
10. an independent member, with insurance expertise, appointed by the President

=== Current voters ===
Current voters as of 2026
Agency	Currently	Since	Appointed	Removable	Notes
Treasury	Scott Bessent	2025	Directly	Any time	
Fed	Kevin Warsh	2026	From 7 Board Members	After 4-year term	
OCC	Jonathan Gould	2025	Directly	Any time	
CFPB	Russell Vought, Acting	2025	Directly	Any time	
SEC	Paul S. Atkins	2025	From 5 Board Members	After 5-year term	
FDIC	Travis Hill	2025	From 3 Board Members	Any time	
CFTC	Michael Selig	2025	From 5 Board Members	After 5-year term	
FHFA	Bill Pulte	2025	Directly	Any time	
NCUA	Kyle S. Hauptman	2025	From 3 Board Members	Any time	
Insurance	Thomas E. Workman	2025	Directly	After 6-year term	

=== Non-voting Members ===
There are five non-voting members:

1. Director of the Office of Financial Research (an independent agency within the Treasury Department and established by the Dodd-Frank Act): Dino Falaschetti
2. Director of the Federal Insurance Office (part of the Treasury Department and established in this Act): Steven E. Seitz
3. a state insurance commissioner, to be designated by a selection process determined by the state insurance commissioners (2-year term): Maine Superintendent Eric Cioppa delegate to the FSOC.
4. a state banking supervisor, to be designated by a selection process determined by the state banking supervisors (2-year term): Charles G. Cooper, Commissioner of the Texas Department of Banking.
5. a state securities commissioner (or officer performing like function) to be designated by a selection process determined by such state security commissioners (2-year term): Melanie Senter Lubin, Maryland Securities Commissioner.

== See also ==
- Dodd-Frank Wall Street Reform and Consumer Protection Act
- Federal Financial Institutions Examination Council
- Office of Financial Research
- Systemic risk
- Title 12 of the Code of Federal Regulations
- Volcker Rule
- MetLife Inc. v. Financial Stability Oversight Council
