= Cuna =

Cuna may refer to:

- Credit Union National Association
- CUNA Credit Union, a defunct credit union based in Madison, Wisconsin
- CUNA Mutual Group, a mutual insurance company based in Madison, Wisconsin
- Guna people, of Panama and Colombia
- Guna language, spoken by the Guna people
- Cuna (bivalve), a genus of bivalve mollusc
- CUNA, a content creator specializing in sleep-focused music

== See also ==
- Guna (disambiguation)
- kuna (disambiguation)
