= Dan Berger =

Dan Berger may refer to:

- B. Dan Berger (born 1966), American lobbyist and artist
- Dan Berger (American academic), American author, historian and professor
