= Svadharma =

Sanskrit term

Svadharma (Sanskrit: स्वधर्म) is a term (from sva: proper, and dharma: law, duty) which, in Hinduism, designates the duties of an individual, according to his modes of material nature or natural disposition, which he must follow.

== Bhagavad-Gita ==
The term is used in the Bhagavad Gita: 3:35 "Better is one's own law of works, swadharma, though in itself faulty than an alien law well-wrought out; death in one's own law of being is better, perilous is it to follow an alien law." and 18:47 "Better is one's own law of works, though in itself faulty, than an alien law well-wrought out. One does not incur sin when one acts in agreement with the law of one's own nature [svabhāva]."

According to Sri Aurobindo, "in Nature each of us has a principle and will of our own becoming; each soul is a force of self-consciousness that formulates an idea of the Divine in it and guides by that its action and evolution, its progressive self-finding, its constant varying self-expression, its apparently uncertain but secretly inevitable growth to fullness. That is our Swabhava, our own real nature; that is our truth of being which is finding now only a constant partial expression in our various becoming in the world. The law of action determined by this Swabhava is our right law of self-shaping, function, working, our Swadharma."

== See also ==
- Dharma
- Guna
- Karma
