= Association of Vermont Credit Unions =

- Type: Trade association
- Industry: Financial Services - Credit Unions
- Predecessor: Vermont Credit Union League, Inc.
- Founded: 1947
- Founders: Roy F. Bergengren
- Headquarters: Colchester, Vermont, United States
- Area served: Vermont
- Key people: Joseph G. Bergeron, President
- Subsidiaries: Association of Vermont Credit Unions Services Corporation
- Website: vermontcreditunions.coop

The Association of Vermont Credit Unions is a federated trade association composed of twenty state and federally chartered credit unions that is itself a member of the Credit Union National Association. Founded as the "Vermont Credit Union League" in 1947, the Association's responsibilities include lobbying the state legislators in Montpelier on behalf of its member credit unions, representing credit union interest to pertinent regulators, administering statewide marketing and youth financial education programs, providing education and information sharing among credit union employees and officials, and delivering certain back-office operational support programs to credit unions including a cooperative ATM/debit card program to a majority of credit unions throughout Vermont. It is headquartered in Colchester.

== Founding ==
While the first credit union in Vermont was established among the employees of the Burlington Rendering Company in 1935, organized cooperation between the state's slowly expanding number of credit unions did not emerge for more than a decade. In 1945, however, Credit Union National Association co-founder Roy F. Bergengren retired from that organization and moved to Vermont, where he soon became active as a volunteer organizer with the Vermont Cooperative Council. On October 26, 1946, the Council sponsored a special meeting of credit union people from around the state, which laid the groundwork for the official founding of the Vermont Credit Union League on May 24, 1947, in White River Junction.
