= National Association of State Credit Union Supervisors =

American organization

National Association of State Credit Union Supervisors (NASCUS)
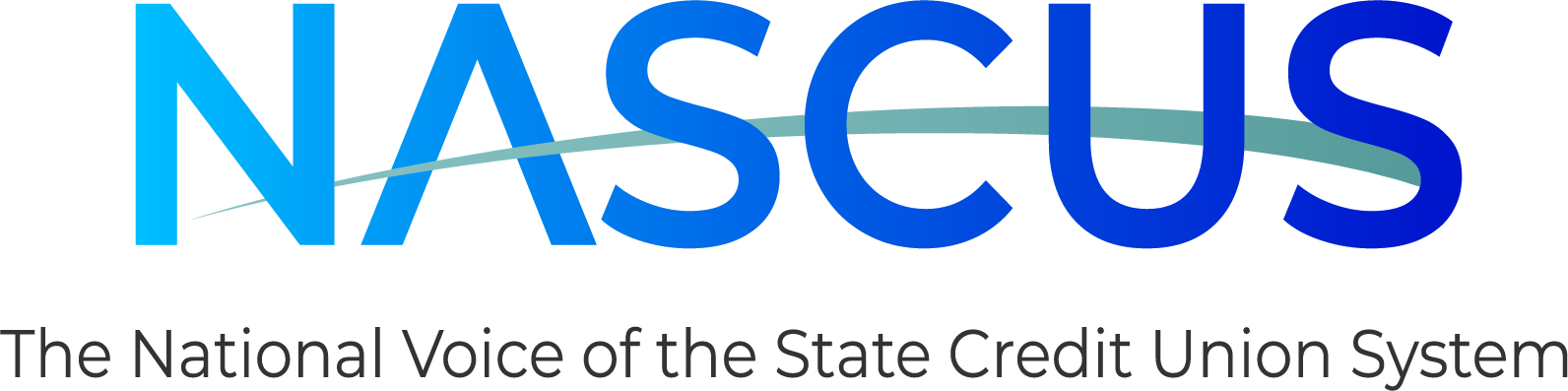
- Formation: 1965
- Headquarters: Arlington, Virginia
- Location: United States
- Website: www.nascus.org

The National Association of State Credit Union Supervisors (NASCUS) is an American organization that was formed in 1965 to serve as the primary resource and voice of the state governmental agencies that charter, regulate and examine the nation's state-chartered credit unions. NASCUS membership is made up of state regulators, state-chartered credit unions, and other supporters of the state credit union system. The organization operates out of its headquarters in Arlington, Virginia.

NASCUS also represents the interests of state agencies before Congress and is the liaison to federal agencies, including the National Credit Union Administration, Department of the Treasury and Consumer Financial Protection Bureau.

== Organization ==
NASCUS' current president and chief executive officer, as of January 1, 2022, is Brian Knight, who formerly served as executive vice president and general counsel for the organization since 2007. In 2005, Mr. Knight developed a Bank Secrecy Act/Anti-Money Laundering compliance conference for examiners and credit unions. Held in partnership with CUNA, the conference today remains the largest credit union specific BSA training in the country.

Knight replaced Lucy Ito, who announced in May 2021 that she would retire from NASCUS on December 31, 2021. NASCUS is governed by a board of directors, which consists of eight state credit union regulators—seven of whom are elected by the regulator membership and one of whom is appointed by the chair of the board.

NASCUS' credit union membership consists of state- and federally-chartered credit unions in the United States. The membership is governed by the NASCUS Credit Union Advisory Council (CUAC)—a group of eight credit union executives—seven of whom are elected by the credit union membership and one of whom is appointed by the Chair of the CUAC. The Credit Union Advisory Council works to protect state authority, promote regulatory innovation, and to promote diversity within the state-chartered system. Credit union members serve in an advisory capacity on some of NASCUS' standing committees.

== See also ==
- National Association of Federally-Insured Credit Unions
- Credit Union National Association
