= Great Wisconsin Credit Union =

- Company type: Credit union
- Industry: Financial services
- Founded: September 14, 1935
- Defunct: 2008
- Fate: Merged
- Successor: Summit Credit Union
- Headquarters: Madison, Wisconsin, United States
- Number of locations: 9 (until merger)
- Website: greatwisconsincu.org

Great Wisconsin Credit Union, formerly known as CUNA Credit Union until 2005, was a credit union that was founded on September 17, 1935, in Madison, Wisconsin. The credit union had been started to serve employees of the CUNA Mutual Group and the local community. By 2007, Great Wisconsin Credit Union had approximately 46,000 members and 428 million dollars in assets. As of 2008, the credit union had a total of nine locations throughout Wisconsin. The credit union became defunct in 2008, after a merger with Summit Credit Union.

== History ==
=== Summit Credit Union merger ===
On November 29, 2007, Great Wisconsin Credit Union announced a merger with Summit Credit Union under the Summit name. Several months later, on March 17, 2008, Great Wisconsin Credit Union and Summit announced that the merger was cleared by the National Credit Union Administration and the Wisconsin Department of Financial Institutions. The merger was finalized, and took place in the Fall of 2008. This resulted in the creation of the largest credit union in the state of Wisconsin with over 1.1 billion dollars in assets.

== See also ==
- CUNA Mutual Group
