= Ed Royce (politician) =

American politician (born 1951)

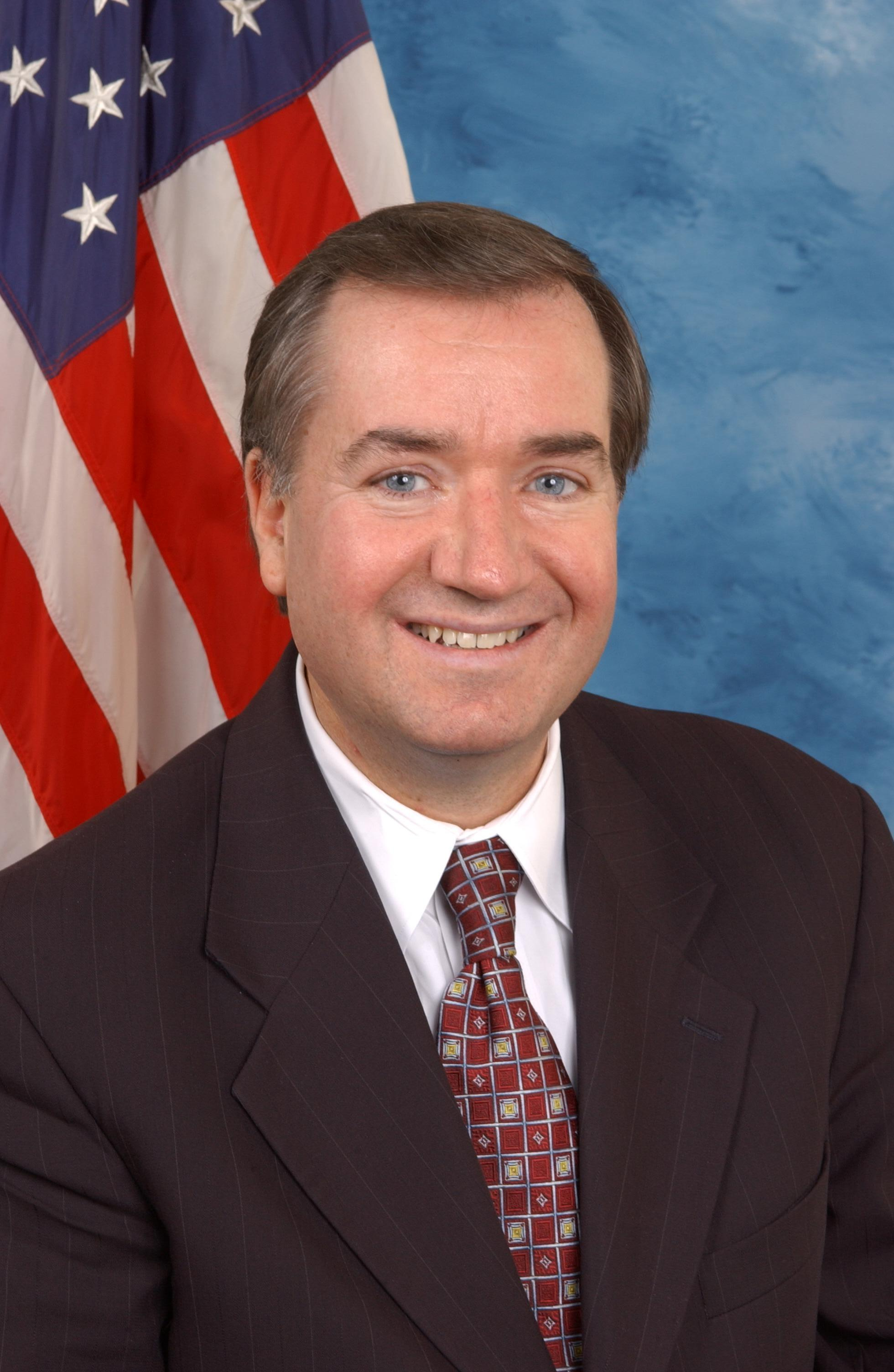

Chair of the House Foreign Affairs Committee
- In office January 3, 2013 – January 3, 2019
- Preceded by: Ileana Ros-Lehtinen
- Succeeded by: Eliot Engel

Member of the U.S. House of Representatives from California
- In office January 3, 1993 – January 3, 2019
- Preceded by: William Dannemeyer
- Succeeded by: Gil Cisneros
- Constituency: 39th district (1993–2003); 40th district (2003–2013); 39th district (2013–2019)

Member of the California Senate from the 32nd district
- In office December 6, 1982 – January 2, 1993
- Preceded by: Ruben Ayala
- Succeeded by: Rob Hurtt

Personal details
- Born: Edward Randall Royce; October 12, 1951 (age 75) Los Angeles, California, U.S.
- Party: Republican
- Spouse: Marie Therese Porter (m. 1985)
- Education: California State University, Fullerton (BA)
- Royce's voice Royce supporting the PEPFAR Extension Act of 2018. Recorded November 13, 2018

Edward Randall Royce (born October 12, 1951) is an American retired politician and lobbyist. He served as a member of the United States House of Representatives from California from 1993 to 2019. A member of the Republican Party, Royce served as Chairman of the United States House Committee on Foreign Affairs from 2013 to 2019. He previously served as a member of the California Senate from 1982 to 1993.

He was reelected to his seat in 2016, having spent over $3.5 million on his campaign. On January 8, 2018, Royce announced that he would retire from Congress at the end of his term and not run for reelection in 2018.

In September 2020, Royce became a lobbyist at the law firm Brownstein Hyatt Farber Schreck.

== Early life and education ==
Royce was born in Los Angeles, California. He graduated from Katella High School in Anaheim, California. He earned his Bachelor of Arts degree in Accounting and Finance in 1977 from California State University, Fullerton.

== Early career ==
Royce was a business owner and corporate tax manager for a Portland cement company before becoming a California State Senator in 1983, serving in that post until his election to the U.S. House of Representatives.

== U.S. House of Representatives ==
=== Elections ===
After redistricting following the 1990 United States census, incumbent Republican U.S. Representative William Dannemeyer decided to retire and run for the 1992 U.S. Senate election. Royce won the Republican primary for what was then California's 39th congressional district, which included most of northern Orange County and southern Los Angeles County.

He defeated Democrat Molly McClanahan in the general election with 57% of the vote.

He won re-election to the 39th district four more times with at least 63% of the vote. After redistricting after the 2000 United States census, his district was renumbered the 40th and cut back to northern Orange County. He won re-election from this district five more times with at least 63% of the vote.

2012

After redistricting, Royce's home in Fullerton was drawn into the 39th district. That district had previously been the 42nd District, represented by fellow Republican Gary Miller. Although it was geographically more Miller's district than Royce's, Royce would have been favored in a primary battle with Miller–which would have been the real contest in this heavily Republican district. Ultimately, Miller opted to move to the neighboring 31st District, effectively handing the seat to Royce.

Royce defeated Jay Chen in the general election.

=== Tenure ===
In 2012 he was endorsed by 11 of 14 Republicans as chairman of the House Foreign Affairs Committee and has served as chairman since January 2013.

Royce voted in favor of the Tax Cuts and Jobs Act of 2017.

=== Committee assignments ===
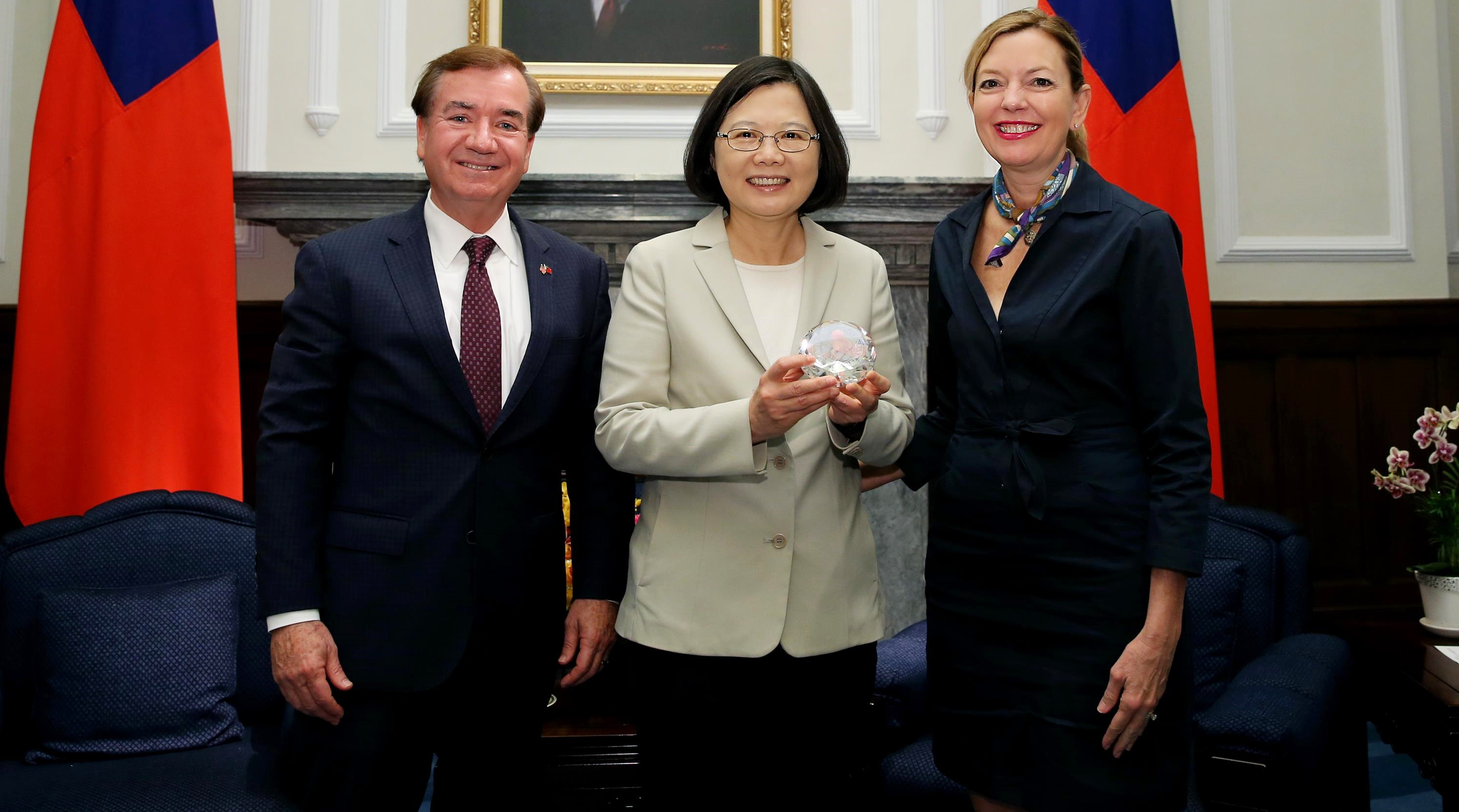
U.S. House Foreign Affairs Committee Chairman Ed Royce and wife Marie meet Taiwanese President Tsai Ing-wen at the Presidential Office in Taipei, Taiwan in 2016

- Committee on Financial Services
  - Subcommittee on Capital Markets, Insurance and Government-Sponsored Enterprises
  - Subcommittee on Financial Institutions and Consumer Credit
- Committee on Foreign Affairs (Chair)

=== Caucus memberships ===
- Human Rights Caucus
- Congressional Military Family Caucus
- Congressional Internet Caucus
- House Recycling Caucus
- Victim's Rights Caucus
- International Conservation Caucus
- Congressional Caucus on Korea
- Congressional Caucus on India and Indian Americans
- Congressional Caucus on Vietnam
- U.S. Philippines Friendship Caucus
- Congressional Cement Caucus
- Climate Solutions Caucus
- House Baltic Caucus
- Republican Study Committee
- Co-chair United States Congressional International Conservation Caucus

=== Retirement ===
Situated in a district that supported Hillary Clinton in the 2016 Presidential election by a margin of eight points, Royce was widely viewed as one of the most vulnerable members of Congress. In December 2017, polling in the 39th District showed a 36% approval rating for Royce and a 60% disapproval rating for President Trump. Additionally, the data showed that a large majority of voters disapproved of Royce's public support and vote in favor of the Republican Tax Cuts and Jobs Act of 2017. Acknowledging the difficult campaign ahead and the end of his six-year term as Chairman of the House Foreign Relations Committee, Royce decided to announce his retirement and decision to not run for reelection in 2018 via Twitter on January 8, 2018.

Thirty minutes following his announcement, President Trump formally nominated Royce's wife Marie Royce to be Assistant Secretary of State for Educational and Cultural Affairs. In retiring, Royce joined the "casualty list" of 36 Republican members of the 115th Congress who have left or announced their intention to leave the House of Representatives.

== Post-congressional career ==
In September 2020, it was announced that Royce would join law firm Brownstein Hyatt Farber Schreck as a lobbyist. In this role, he has worked as a registered foreign agent on behalf of the government of Saudi Arabia. In 2025, it was reported that Royce would lobby on behalf of technology firm Nvidia.

== Political positions and PACs ==
Royce voted in line with President Trump's position in 97.9% of the votes in the 115th United States Congress. For the 114th United States Congress, Royce was ranked as the 27th most bipartisan member of the U.S. House of Representatives (and the most bipartisan member of the U.S. House of Representatives from California) in the Bipartisan Index created by The Lugar Center and the McCourt School of Public Policy that ranks members of the United States Congress by their degree of bipartisanship (by measuring the frequency each member's bills attract co-sponsors from the opposite party and each member's co-sponsorship of bills by members of the opposite party). Over his career, Royce has received nearly $7 million from PACs. In the 2016 race, he raised over $4.2 million and spent over $3.5 million.

His campaign committee received funds from Northwest Excavating, Deutsche Bank, Morgan Stanley and NorPac. The Sunlight Foundation gave Royce's web site a 24 percent rating for transparency, with 40 percent being considered a passing score. Royce's website highlights support from conservative groups such as 60 Plus and business organizations such as the National Taxpayers Union and Citizens Against Government Waste. He received praise from the American Share Holders Association, Citizens for a Sound Economy, and the Small Business Survival Committee.

For the 113th Congress, the Washington Post named Royce as one of the “10 most effective lawmakers in the U.S. Congress”, citing his authorship of the Global Anti-Poaching Act (H.R. 2494) and the Hizballah International Financing Prevention Act of 2015 (H.R. 2297).

=== Domestic policy ===
Royce's voting record, his scores on VoteMatch, and ratings by the Cato Institute indicate mixed or moderate positions on free trade, privatization of social security, campaign finance, and tax reform.

==== Abortion ====
Royce is pro-life.

==== Banking deregulation, business issues ====
One of Royce's early signature issues was banking deregulation. He has sponsored legislation on tax policy, small businesses, and credit. Many of his biggest campaign contributors have been banks: his five top contributors in 2006 were Credit Union National Assn, Irvine Co., Wells Fargo, Orange County Teachers Fed Credit Union, and GUS plc. He is among the representatives receiving the largest percentage of their campaign contributions from the banking industry.

On November 13, 2013, Royce introduced the Credit Union Share Insurance Fund Parity Act (H.R. 3468; 113th Congress) into the House. The bill would expand federal deposit insurance to include Interest on Lawyer Trust Accounts (IOLTAs) and similar escrow accounts housed within credit unions.

==== Cannabis ====
Royce has a "C" rating from NORML regarding his voting record on cannabis-related matters. He voted against allowing veterans access to medical marijuana, if legal in their state, per their Veterans Health Administration doctor's recommendation.

==== Guns ====
Royce had a "A" rating from the NRA Political Victory Fund regarding his voting record on gun-related matters.

In the wake of the 2016 Orlando nightclub shooting, Royce posted on Facebook: "We need to defeat the terrorists and make it our top national security priority to prevail in the war against radical Islamic extremism."

==== Taxes and budgets ====
He has received 14 "Taxpayer Friend Awards" from the National Taxpayers' Union. Royce opposes funding for the Overseas Private Investment Corporation (OPIC). Royce has posited that these overseas investments expose taxpayers to a serious potential liability, just like the S&L crisis did.

==== Victims' rights ====
Royce sponsored anti-stalking legislation signed into law by President Bill Clinton, which was based on legislation Royce had authored as a California State Senator. In 2003, he sponsored another bill as US representative related to victims.

==== Health care ====
On May 4, 2017, he voted to repeal the Patient Protection and Affordable Care Act (Obamacare) and pass the American Health Care Act.

=== Foreign policy ===
In foreign policy, Royce's voting record has earned a 0% rating from the peace organization SANE. In 2011, Royce voted against the National Defense Authorization Act for Fiscal Year 2012 as part of a controversial provision that allows the government and the military to indefinitely detain American citizens and others without trial.

==== Iran nuclear agreement ====
In 2016, Royce criticized the Iran nuclear agreement and Obama administration harshly, saying the deal was "a financial windfall” for Iran and a "a cash bonanza, a boost to its international standing, and a lighted path toward nuclear weapons." He called for re-introducing sanctions on Iran. Later, in 2017, after Donald Trump had become president, Royce said that he was in favor of staying in the Iran nuclear agreement.

==== North Korea ====
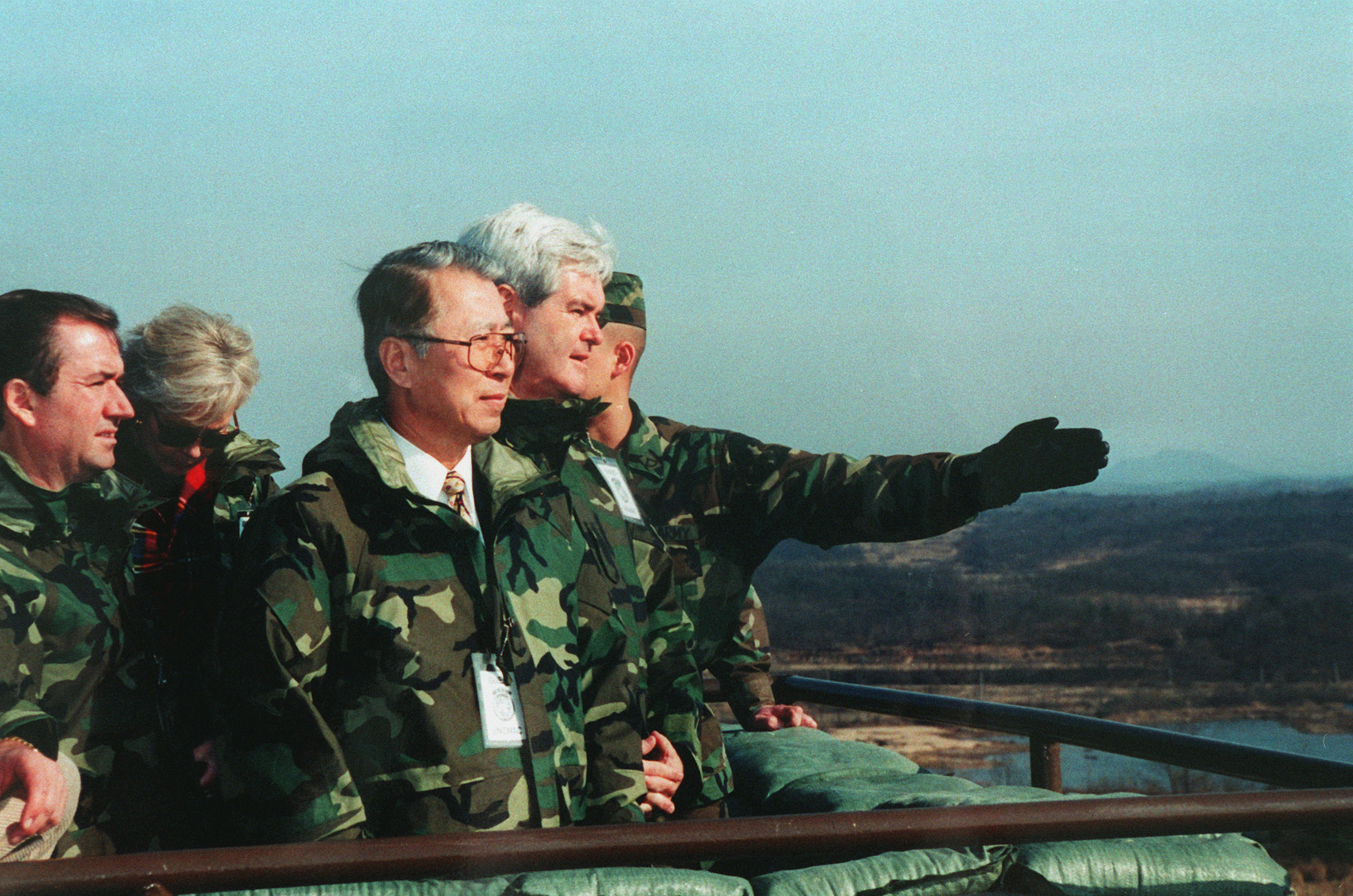
Congressmen Royce, Jay Kim and House Speaker Newt Gingrich face North Korea from the Joint Security Area in 1997

Royce serves as a senior member of the Foreign Affairs Subcommittee on Asia. He and has been especially involved in policy regarding North Korea, working on issues such as human rights, counterfeiting of U.S. currency, nuclear proliferation, and stopping repatriation of refugees. Royce's district includes Fullerton, which has a large population of Korean immigrants. During a slow-rolling crisis in 2017 between the US and North Korea, Royce introduced legislation expanding sanctions against North Korea and requiring that its designation as a state sponsor of terror be reinstated.

==== Conflicts in Iraq, Afghanistan, Libya, and Yemen ====
Royce was a supporter of the US wars in Iraq and Afghanistan. In 2002, he voted in favor of authorizing President George W. Bush to use force in Iraq. In 2003, he voted yes on an emergency appropriation of $78 billion for the wars in Iraq and Afghanistan. From 2003 to 2006, he voted in favor of the annual supplemental spending bill to continue funding for the Iraq war. In 2005, he voted against Amendment 214 to HR 1815, which called on Bush to develop a plan for withdrawing U.S. troops from Iraq; in favor of Amendment 488 to HR 2601 to keep troops in Iraq; and in favor of HR 612 opposing a timetable for withdrawal of troops from Iraq. In 2006, he voted for HR 861, a resolution labeling the war in Iraq as part of a global war against terrorism.

He has supported U.S. broadcasting efforts in Asia, initiating legislation to create Radio Free Asia and Radio Free Afghanistan on the model of Radio Free Europe/Radio Liberty. Royce had a mixed voting record on the 2011 US involvement in Libya. In 2015, he supported the Saudi Arabian-led intervention in Yemen.

==== Genocide in Myanmar ====
In 2018, Royce condemned the genocide of the Rohingya Muslim minority in Myanmar and called for a stronger response to the crisis, saying that "Defining these atrocities for what they are is critical to building international public awareness – and support – to stop them."

==== Africa ====
Royce was formerly chair of the Africa Subcommittee. He co-led, with Colin Powell, a delegation to observe Nigeria's historic elections in 1999 and led a delegation to Darfur to bring attention to the ongoing genocide in 2005 and led efforts in the House to bring Charles Taylor, the former President of Liberia, to stand trial before the Special Court of Sierra Leone.

=== Legislation ===
On April 26, 2013, Royce introduced the North Korea Sanctions Enforcement Act of 2013 (H.R. 1771; 113th Congress), a bill that would increase U.S. sanctions on North Korea. Royce said that "by shutting down North Korea's illicit activities, we deprive the Kim regime of the money he needs to pay his generals and to conduct nuclear weapons research." Royce also argued that "North Korea is undoubtedly one of the most significant security threats that we here face and our allies face."

On June 27, 2013, Royce introduced the Electrify Africa Act of 2013 (H.R. 2548; 113th Congress), a bill that would direct the President to establish a multiyear strategy to assist countries in sub-Saharan Africa develop an appropriate mix of power solutions to provide sufficient electricity access to people living in rural and urban areas in order to alleviate poverty and drive economic growth.

On November 13, 2013, Royce introduced the Taiwan Relations Act Affirmation and Naval Vessel Transfer Act of 2014 (H.R. 3470; 113th Congress) into the House. The bill would allow the sale of several Oliver Hazard Perry-class frigates to Mexico, Thailand, and Taiwan. Four naval vessels would be sold to Taiwan for about $10 million each. Mexico and Thailand would each receive two vessels as a grant. Royce argued in favor of the bill saying that "these ships would bolster Taiwan's defense." Royce also said that "these transfers help support the priorities of the U.S. Navy while strengthening the capability of allies and our close partners to meet our share maritime security objectives."

In January 2017, Royce introduced a House resolution condemning the UN Security Council Resolution 2334, which condemned Israeli settlement building in the occupied Palestinian territories as a violation of international law.

== Awards and honors ==
- Order of Brilliant Star with Grand Cordon – Taiwan-Republic of China
- Order of Brilliant Star with Special Grand Cordon – Taiwan-Republic of China
- Ellis Island Medal of Honor, 2014

== Personal life ==
Royce is married to Marie Therese Porter, a businesswoman, former professor at California State Polytechnic University, Pomona, and the Assistant Secretary of State for Educational and Cultural Affairs.

Royce is Roman Catholic.

U.S. House of Representatives
Preceded by William Dannemeyer	Member of the U.S. House of Representatives from California's 39th congressional district 1993–2003	Succeeded by Linda Sánchez
Preceded by Jerry Lewis	Member of the U.S. House of Representatives from California's 40th congressional district 2003–2013	Succeeded by Lucille Roybal-Allard
Preceded by Linda Sánchez	Member of the U.S. House of Representatives from California's 39th congressional district 2013–2019	Succeeded by Gil Cisneros
Preceded by Ileana Ros-Lehtinen	Chair of the House Foreign Affairs Committee; 2013–2019	Succeeded by Eliot Engel
U.S. order of precedence (ceremonial)
Preceded by Wally Herger as Former U.S. Representative	Order of precedence of the United States as Former U.S. Representative	Succeeded by Barbara Lee as Former U.S. Representative
