= Roy Bergengren =

American lawyer (1879–1955)

- Born: June 14, 1879; Gloucester, Massachusetts
- Died: November 11, 1955 (aged 76); Montpelier, Vermont
- Occupations: Businessman; philanthropist
- Spouse: Gladys Bergengren
- Children: Dorothy Bergengren Hartman Dr. Roy Bergengren, Jr. (b. 1915)

Roy F. Bergengren (June 14, 1879 – November 11, 1955) was an American attorney and pioneer of the United States credit union movement. Hired by Edward Filene in July 1921 to head the Credit Union National Extension Bureau, Bergengren carried out an ambitious legislative agenda that resulted in the enactment of the Federal Credit Union Act, the creation of the Credit Union National Association (CUNA), and the foundation of thousands of credit unions across the United States.

== Early career ==
Bergengren was trained as an attorney and in 1914 was elected the Commissioner of Finance in Lynn, Massachusetts. He participated in World War I and was largely unsatisfied with his poverty law practice prior to meeting Edward Filene, a successful Massachusetts businessman and champion of credit unions. In 1920, Bergengren was hired to manage the Massachusetts Credit Union Association where he promoted the development of credit unions. Massachusetts chartered 19 new credit unions in the following year. Filene found in Roy Bergengren the key organizer he needed to spearhead the credit union movement in the United States. Together with Filene, Bergengren founded the Credit Union National Extension Bureau in 1921 to work towards establishing credit union laws in all states and at the federal level. Filene poured more than $1 million of his own money into the project.

== Credit Union National Extension Bureau ==
Many ordinary American workers did not have access to loans when they needed them and fell victim to usury and loan sharks. Bergengren and Filene proposed credit unions as the solution. The Extension Bureau, of which Bergengren was the executive secretary, had four goals:

1. to bring about the laws needed for credit union development in the various states,
2. subsequently, to organize some credit unions in each state that could serve as examples to others,
3. to expand the number of credit unions to the point that they could create self-sustaining state federations, and
4. to combine the federations into a self-sustaining national association.

In June 1924, the Extension Bureau began publishing The Bridge, a precursor to Credit Union Magazine of which Bergengren was the editor. Bergengren travelled the country and attended the meetings of credit union organizers. Bergengren appeared before state legislators and recruited volunteer organizers. He was a gifted orator and gave passionate speeches.

The real job of a credit union is to prove, in modest measure, the practicality of the brotherhood of man.

Laws were passed and the Extension Bureau began to realize its goals. When Bergengren started what he referred to as his "crusade," there were only 199 credit unions in the U.S. By 1925, 15 states had passed credit union laws and 419 credit unions were serving 108,000 members.

The collaboration between Bergengren and Filene, and the work of the Extension Bureau, proved very effective. It brought state laws to fruition in 26 states and substantially revised flawed legal frameworks in 5 others. In 1934 the Roosevelt Administration passed the Federal Credit Union Act, making it possible to form a credit union anywhere in the United States.

The Extension Bureau has been a model for many projects related to international development and microfinance since. Foreshadowing debates that still rage however, the views of Filene and Bergengren diverged on two key issues.

First, Bergengren believed that the Extension Bureau should attempt to secure federal legislation first, rather than work state by state. Filene prevailed in this debate, maintaining that a national law should be based on a sound understanding of the diverse circumstances of people across America—from shrimp fishermen in Louisiana, to factory workers in Massachusetts or farmers in the mid-West. Only by developing many state laws first would such a sound national understanding be possible.

Second, as the Great Depression set in the Reconstruction Finance Corporation under President Hoover sought to stimulate the economy with soft loans targeted to banks, railways and large companies. Filene favoured asking for $100 million in reconstruction credits to be pumped into credit unions. Bergengren strongly opposed this position, and his view prevailed this time. "To him, it meant destroying the vital principle of the whole movement by converting a community enterprise into an agency of the government. To teach people how to help themselves was more important by far in times of depression than at any other time."

== Credit Union National Association ==
With the work of the Bureau essentially completed, a national meeting of credit union leaders was called at Estes Park, Colorado. In a letter to Edward Filene, Bergengren wrote "I sincerely believe that what we are going to do at Estes Park will have extraordinary consequences." On August 11, 1934, the Credit Union National Association (CUNA) – a national federation funded by the nation's credit unions – was formed to replace the Bureau.

Bergengren was named managing director of the newly formed CUNA and by 1937, 6400 credit unions with 1.5 million members were active in 45 states.

Bergengren was forced to resign from CUNA in 1945 after a bitter internal struggle, and subsequently moved to Vermont, where he directed that state's League until his death. He was especially interested in international credit unions and, one year before his death, Bergengren convinced CUNA directors to establish a world extension department.

== Legacy ==
Bergengren's tenacity and dedication resulted in the proliferation of credit unions across the United States. By the end of 2008, U.S. credit unions had 89 million members. This is the largest membership of any country in the world, and one of the highest levels of market penetration in the world. Bergengren was inducted to the Cooperative Hall of Fame in 1979. A credit union in Nova Scotia is named for him as is an award from the CUNA Mutual Group.

== Bibliography ==
- Credit Union, The Beekman Hill Press, 1931
- We the People, The Stratford Company, 1932
- CUNA Emerges, Credit Union National Association, 1935
- Soul, The Cantwell Press, 1938
- The War and After, Straus Printing Company, 1942
- I Speak for Joe Doakes, Harper & Brothers, 1945
- Crusade; The Fight for Economic Democracy in North America, 1921-1945, Exposition Press, 1952

== See also ==
- Credit unions in the United States
- Edward Filene
- History of credit unions
- National Credit Union Administration
