= America's Credit Unions =

U.S. trade association for the credit union industry

- Founded: 2024; 2 years ago
- Merger of: Credit Union National Association, National Association of Federally-Insured Credit Unions
- Type: 501(c)(6)
- Purpose: Trade association
- Headquarters: 99 M Street SE #300, Washington, D.C., U.S.
- President and CEO: Scott Simpson
- Website: www.americascreditunions.org

America's Credit Unions is a national trade association for both state- and federally chartered credit unions located in the United States. It was launched in 2024 as part of the merger between the Credit Union National Association (CUNA) and the National Association of Federally-Insured Credit Unions (NAFCU). Once fully operational in 2025, America's Credit Unions will provide its member credit unions with trade association services, such as lobbying, regulatory advocacy, professional development, and professional services management. The organization is headquartered in Washington, D.C.

== History ==
On August 1, 2023, the CUNA and NAFCU boards of directors announced their intent to merge, forming a new entity called America's Credit Unions. The merger was approved by CUNA and NAFCU members and became effective on January 1, 2024, when CUNA and longtime CUNA CEO Jim Nussle is the president and CEO of the new association.

CUNA and NAFCU will continue to operate as distinct organizations under the America's Credit Unions brand while they combine their operations throughout 2024. In March 2024, the organization announced plans to lay off about a quarter of CUNA's Madison, Wisconsin-based workforce.

On December 12, 2024, America's Credit Unions joined other banking trade groups to block the Consumer Financial Protection Bureau's proposed rule limiting overdraft fees to $5 for banks and credit unions with over $10 billion in assets.

Scott Simpson was announced as the president and CEO of America’s Credit Unions, effective November 3, 2025, succeeding Jim Nussle.

== See also ==
- Credit Union National Association
- National Association of Federal Credit Unions
- National Credit Union Foundation
