= Credit Union Share Insurance Fund Parity Act =

- Long title: To amend the Federal Credit Union Act to extend insurance coverage to amounts held in a member account on behalf of another person, and for other purposes.
- Announced in: the 113th United States Congress
- Sponsored by: Rep. Edward R. Royce (R, CA-39)
- Number of co-sponsors: 3

Codification
- Acts affected: Federal Credit Union Act
- U.S.C. sections affected: 12 U.S.C. § 1787
- Agencies affected: Federal Deposit Insurance Corporation

Legislative history
- Introduced in the House as H.R. 3468 by Rep. Edward R. Royce (R, CA-39) on November 13, 2013; Committee consideration by United States House Committee on Financial Services

The Credit Union Share Insurance Fund Parity Act (H.R. 3468) is a bill that would expand federal deposit insurance to include Interest on Lawyer Trust Accounts (IOLTAs) and similar escrow accounts housed within credit unions.

The bill was introduced into the United States House of Representatives during the 113th United States Congress.

== Provisions of the bill ==
This summary is based largely on the summary provided by the Congressional Research Service, a public domain source.

The Credit Union Share Insurance Fund Parity Act would amend the Federal Credit Union Act to include in the net amount of share insurance payable to any member at an insured credit union the total amount of the shares or deposits held in the member's account on behalf of another person, after making certain offsets and deductions.

The bill would modify National Credit Union Administration (NCUA) Board authority to define the extent of the share insurance coverage provided where a member holds funds for the use of a nonmember. The bill would require coverage for an account established by a member to be consistent with Federal Deposit Insurance Corporation (FDIC) coverage, regardless of the membership status of the owner of the funds deposited in an account established by a credit union member.

== Congressional Budget Office report ==
This summary is based largely on the summary provided by the Congressional Budget Office, as ordered reported by the House Committee on Financial Services on November 14, 2013. This is a public domain source.

H.R. 3468 would expand federal deposit insurance to include Interest on Lawyer Trust Accounts (IOLTAs) and similar escrow accounts housed within credit unions. Enacting this legislation would increase the cost to the government of resolving some future credit union failures; the Congressional Budget Office (CBO) estimates those costs would be minimal and would generally be offset by other collections, resulting in no significant net impact on direct spending over the next 10 years.

Pay-as-you-go procedures apply because enacting H.R. 3468 would affect direct spending. Enacting the legislation would have no effect on revenues.

Attorneys and law firms use IOLTAs to pool client funds that are small enough in size and expected duration that establishing separate trusts would not benefit the individuals. Interest earned on IOLTA deposits is used to fund legal expenses for low-income individuals and for other justice-related projects. Under current law, IOLTAs are not insured by the National Credit Union Administration (NCUA). H.R. 3468 would extend federal insurance to those accounts.

While, in some cases, increasing insured deposits would raise the cost of resolving a failed credit union, the CBO expects net costs to the federal government in this case would be insignificant. By definition, deposits into IOLTAs are nominal in size and are held for a short period of time; thus, they make up a very small percentage of a credit union’s liabilities. Second, IOLTA deposits already receive federal insurance through the Federal Deposit Insurance Corporation (FDIC). Any deposits insured as a result of this legislation that were previously held by an FDIC-insured institution are not expected to increase net costs to the federal government (in other words, any increase in costs to the NCUA would be offset by a decrease in costs to the FDIC). Finally, except in rare circumstances, the NCUA must keep the balance of its Share Insurance Fund within a specified range, with member credit unions assessed or rebated amounts outside of that range. Under current law, the CBO assumes the fund will operate above that range in most years, resulting in rebates. In those scenarios, any small increase in cost as result of this legislation would result in an equivalent reduction in rebates to member credit unions, with no net change in direct spending.

H.R. 3468 contains no intergovernmental or private-sector mandates as defined in the Unfunded Mandates Reform Act and would impose no costs on state, local, or tribal governments.

== Procedural history ==
The Credit Union Share Insurance Fund Parity Act was introduced into the United States House of Representatives on November 13, 2013 by Rep. Edward R. Royce (R, CA-39). The bill was referred to the United States House Committee on Financial Services. The bill was scheduled to be voted on under suspension of the rules on May 6, 2014.

== Debate and discussion ==
The National Association of Federal Credit Unions (NAFCU) supported H.R. 3468. Vice President of Legislative Affairs Brad Thaler said that "we applaud the committee for taking the steps today to advance regulatory relief for community institutions and hope that this will be the start of an ongoing effort." The NAFCU said that the bill "would advance parity for accounts in credit unions and banks protected by the National Credit Union Share Insurance Fund and FDIC Bank Insurance Fund" which "reflects a key element of NAFCU's five-point plan for credit union regulatory relief."

The Credit Union National Association (CUNA) also supported H.R. 3468. The CUNA said that "this legislation is necessary because the National Credit Union Administration (NCUA) has interpreted that the Federal Credit Union Act does not permit it to extend such coverage." CUNA President Bill Cheney said that the bill "would reduce credit unions regulatory burden and help them better serve their members."

== See also ==
- List of bills in the 113th United States Congress
