= Marie Royce =

American diplomat

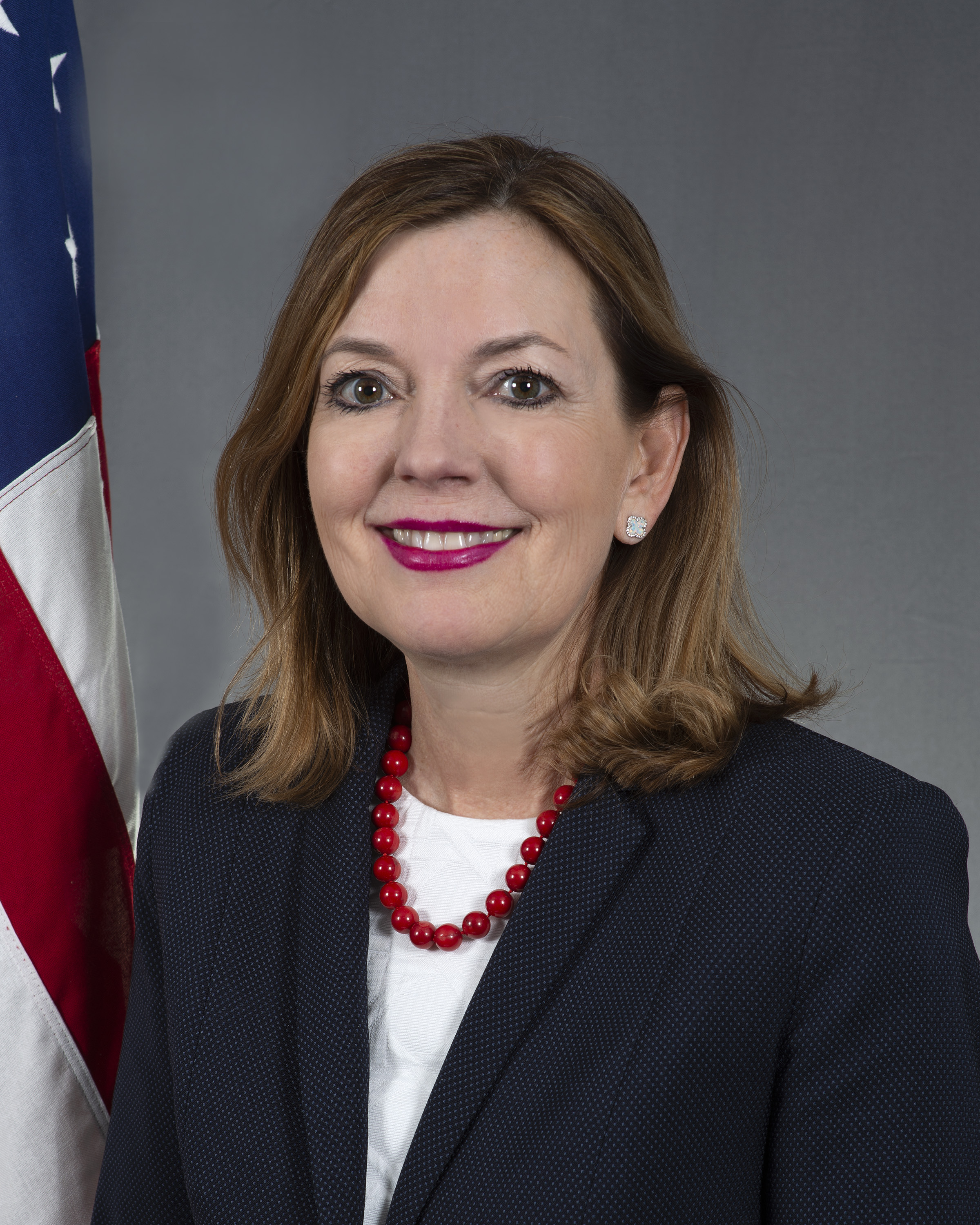
- Official portrait, 2018

15th Assistant Secretary of State for Educational and Cultural Affairs
- In office March 30, 2018 – January 20, 2021
- President: Donald Trump
- Preceded by: Evan Ryan
- Succeeded by: Lee Satterfield

Personal details
- Born: Marie Thérèse Porter California, U.S.
- Spouse: Ed Royce
- Education: California State Polytechnic University, Pomona (BS); Georgetown University (MBA)

Marie Royce (born Marie Thérèse Porter), is an American businesswoman, diplomat, and educator. She was the assistant secretary of state for educational and cultural affairs from 2018 to 2021. She was nominated by President Donald Trump and was unanimously confirmed by the U.S. Senate. Royce was succeeded by Lee Satterfield on November 23, 2021.

== Education ==
Royce graduated from California State Polytechnic University, Pomona, with a bachelor of science degree in marketing management and management human resources. She earned an MBA in international business from Georgetown University in 1996. Royce is a lifetime member of the international honor society Beta Gamma Sigma (BGS), which honors academic achievement.

== Career ==
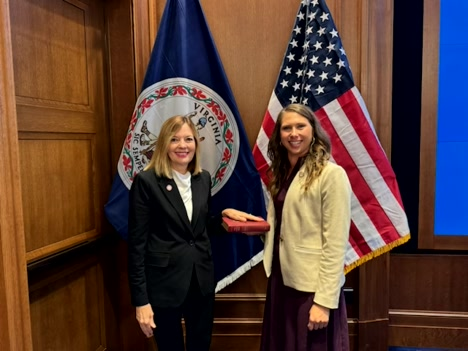
Marie Royce VMFA swearing in ceremony with Kelly Gee

Royce was a faculty member at California State Polytechnic University, Pomona. While working in the private sector for over 30 years, Royce held senior management positions at Marriott International, Choice Hotels International, Procter & Gamble, and Alcatel-Lucent.

Royce served as a private sector appointee on the Advisory Committee on International Communications and Information Policy (ACICIP) at the U.S. Department of State.

While serving as assistant secretary of state, Royce was part of the presidential delegation to the final match of the 2019 FIFA Women's World Cup in Lyon, France.

In August 2024, Governor Glenn Youngkin and Secretary of the Commonwealth Kelly Gee appointed Marie Royce to the Virginia Museum of Fine Arts's board of trustees (VMFA), for a term of five years. The VMFA is a state-supported, privately endowed institution created for the benefit of the citizens of the Commonwealth of Virginia.

=== Awards ===
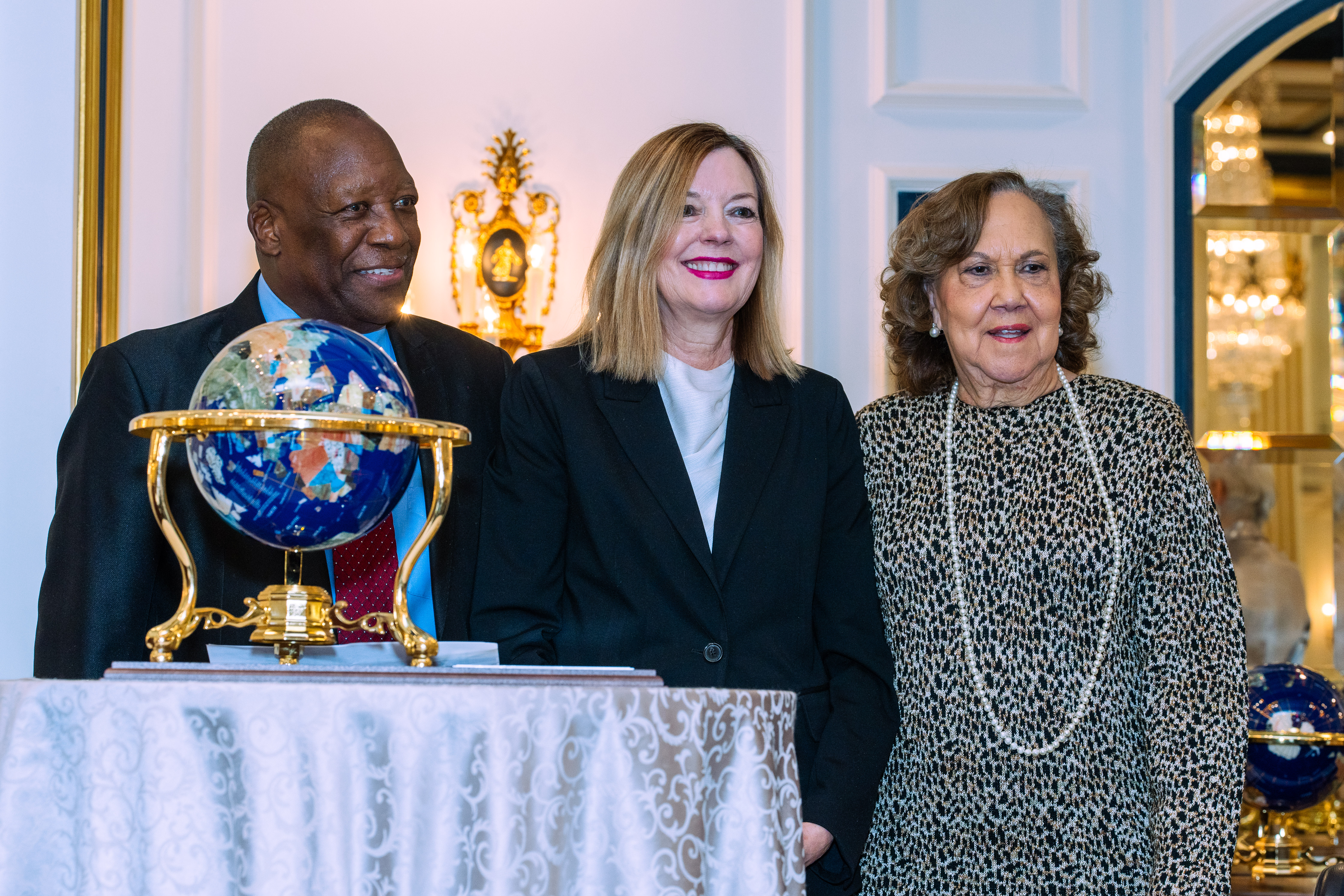
From Left to Right: Ambassador H.E. Denis G. Antoine, Ph.D.; The Honorable Marie Royce; and the CEO of IAMMM, Madeline Y. Lawson.

Royce was selected as an American Council of Young Political Leaders (ACYPL) delegate to Hungary and Poland and received the ACYPL Honors Award in 2018. The American Women for International Understanding (AWIU) recognized her with their Internationalism Award in 2013. In 1994, Royce was Cal Poly Pomona's Distinguished Alumna for the College of Business and their commencement speaker. Royce was named "Legend of International Business and Marketing" by Cal Poly Pomona in 2012. The award honors significant, sustained contributions by an alumnus in the field of international business or marketing.

In 2019, Royce was decorated with the "Order of Civil Merit, Commander by Number," by Felipe VI. In October 2020, Royce was recognized with an Honorary Doctor Causa from the University of Tirana in Albania. In 2021, Royce was honored by her high school alma mater, Pomona Catholic, with their Pillar of Scholarship Distinguished Alumna Award.

In April 2021, Royce joined the University of Southern California Center on Public Diplomacy's board of advisors. Royce was also honored with the Congressional Families Cancer Prevention Program's Leadership Award.

In September 2021, Royce was honored with the Career Achievement Award at the 2021 Professional Fraternity Association Conference in Irving, Texas for her service as the former assistant secretary of state. The Career Achievement Award is the highest level of recognition given by the Professional Fraternity Association, which represents over 100,000 undergraduate and graduate students on over 1,000 college campuses across the nation. Royce has been active with the co-ed professional fraternity Pi Sigma Epsilon, one of the 30 fraternal member groups represented by PFA that has collectively initiated 2.5 million members in professional fields. Royce was selected for her career achievements in the private sector, her philanthropic work at the U.S. Department of State, and her continued involvement over the past 40 years.

In January 2025, Royce was honored with the Dr. Martin Luther King Jr. Legacy Award for "Leadership in Global Education" by the Institute for the Advancement of Multicultural and Minority Medicine (IAMMM). The ceremony was held at the Willard Hotel in Washington, D.C., where Royce was recognized for her accomplishments and contributions over the years.

The Council on International Educational Exchange (CIEE) presented Royce with the CIEE BridgeUSA "Vision and Impact" Award at their 2025 International Exchange Conference in Washington, D.C. Royce was recognized for her leadership in launching the BridgeUSA brand and expanding global exchange initiatives, including the Academy for Women Entrepreneurs—now active in more than 100 countries.

== Personal life ==
Royce is married to Ed Royce, a former member of the U.S. House of Representatives.
