= Lee Satterfield =

American diplomat

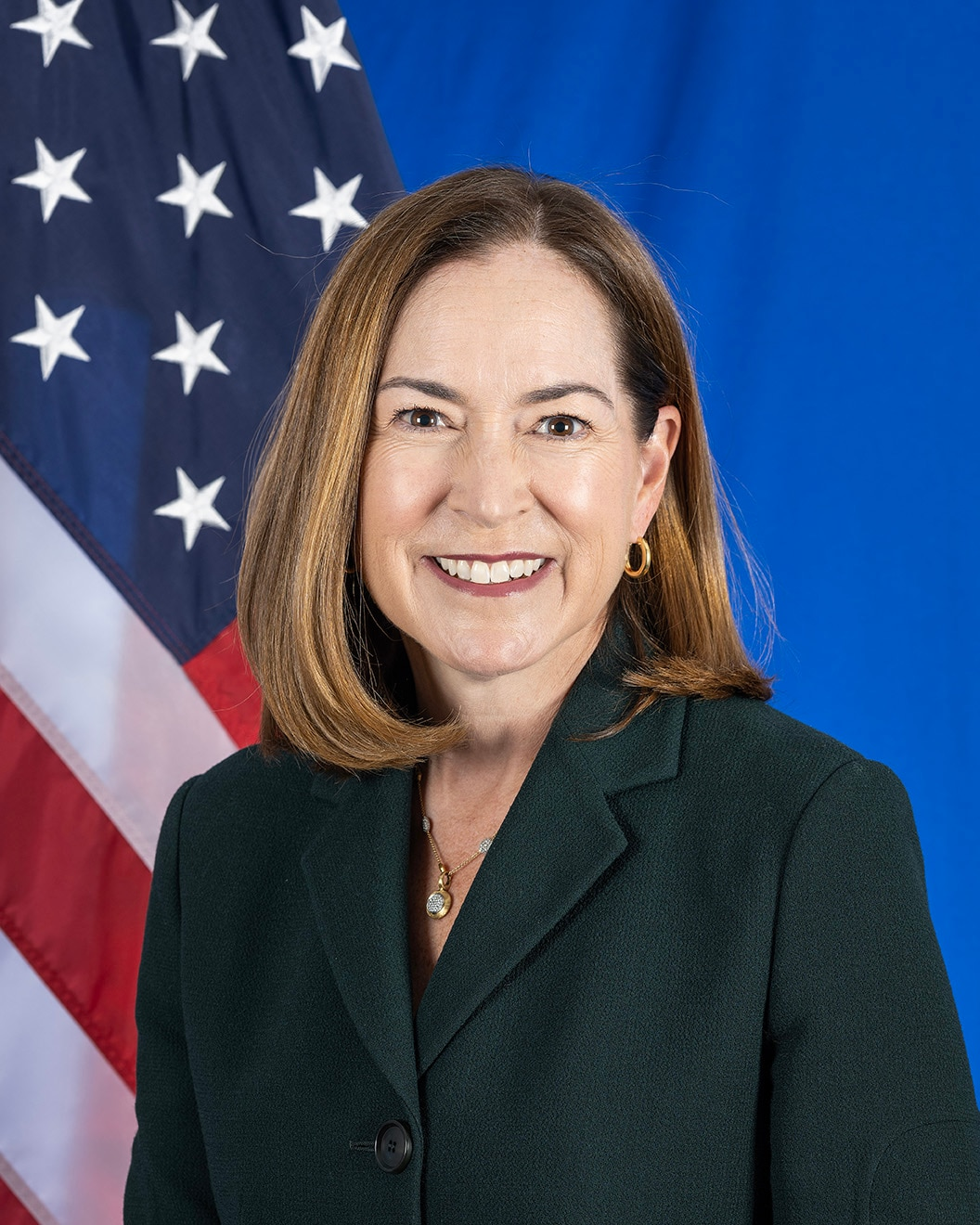

Under Secretary of State for Public Diplomacy and Public Affairs
- Acting
- In office August 3, 2024 – January 20, 2025
- President: Joe Biden
- Preceded by: Elizabeth M. Allen
- Succeeded by: Darren Beattie (Acting)

16th Assistant Secretary of State for Educational and Cultural Affairs
- In office November 23, 2021 – January 20, 2025
- President: Joe Biden
- Preceded by: Marie Royce
- Succeeded by: Catherine Dillon

Personal details
- Born: Lee Ann Satterfield South Carolina, U.S.
- Spouse: Patrick Steel (m. 1997)
- Education: University of South Carolina (BA)

Lee Satterfield is an American diplomat who had served as Assistant Secretary of State for Educational and Cultural Affairs in the Biden administration.

== Early life and education ==
Satterfield is a native of South Carolina. She earned a Bachelor of Arts degree in journalism from the University of South Carolina.

== Career ==
Satterfield joined the White House Office in 1993, serving as a scheduler for Vice President Al Gore, special assistant to President Bill Clinton, and staff director of the Office of Public Liaison. She then joined the United States Department of Labor, serving as deputy chief of staff from 1997 to 1999 and chief of staff from 1999 to 2001 under Secretary Alexis Herman. In 2001 and 2002, Satterfield worked as deputy COO and chief of staff of the Democratic National Committee. From 2003 to 2004, she was the DNC's director of convention planning. After working as an independent consultant, Satterfield joined the United States Department of State during the Obama administration, serving as the deputy chief of protocol and deputy assistant secretary of the Bureau of Educational and Cultural Affairs. Satterfield became president and CEO of Meridian International Center in 2015.

=== Biden administration ===
On April 27, 2021, President Joe Biden nominated Satterfield to be an Assistant Secretary for the Bureau of Educational and Cultural Affairs at the U.S. State Department. Hearings were held on Satterfield's nomination before the Senate Foreign Relations Committee on July 27, 2021. The committee favorably reported her nomination to the Senate floor on August 4, 2021. The entire Senate confirmed Satterfield on November 18, 2021, by voice vote.

Satterfield assumed office on November 23, 2021. She was appointed acting Under Secretary for Public Diplomacy and Public Affairs on August 3, 2024.

== Personal life ==
Satterfield married Patrick Steel in 1997.
