= Mortgage Choice Act of 2013 =

- Long title: To amend the Truth in Lending Act to improve upon the definitions provided for points and fees in connection with a mortgage transaction.
- Announced in: the 113th United States Congress
- Sponsored by: Rep. Bill Huizenga (R, MI-2)
- Number of co-sponsors: 9

Codification
- Acts affected: Truth in Lending Act, Real Estate Settlement Procedures Act of 1974
- U.S.C. sections affected: 15 U.S.C. § 1639c, 12 U.S.C. § 2602, 15 U.S.C. § 1602
- Agencies affected: Bureau of Consumer Financial Protection

Legislative history
- Introduced in the House as H.R. 3211 by Rep. Bill Huizenga (R, MI-2) on September 28, 2013; Committee consideration by United States House Committee on Financial Services; Passed the House on June 9, 2014 (voice vote)

The Mortgage Choice Act of 2013 (H.R. 3211) is a bill that would direct the Consumer Financial Protection Bureau (CFPB) to amend its regulations related to qualified mortgages to reflect new exclusions made by this bill. The CFPB released new regulations regarding the definition of a Qualified Mortgage that took effect in January 2014, a definition that this bill would modify.

The bill was introduced and passed in the United States House of Representatives during the 113th United States Congress.

== Background ==
The U.S. subprime mortgage crisis was a nationwide banking emergency that triggered the recession of 2008, through subprime mortgage delinquencies and foreclosures, resulting in the devaluation of the attendant securities.

These mortgage-backed securities (MBS) and collateralized debt obligations (CDO) initially offered attractive rates of return due to the higher interest rates on the mortgages; however, the lower credit quality ultimately caused massive defaults. While elements of the crisis first became more visible during 2007, several major financial institutions collapsed in September 2008, with significant disruption in the flow of credit to businesses and consumers and the onset of a severe global recession.

There were many causes of the crisis, with commentators assigning different levels of blame to financial institutions, regulators, credit agencies, government housing policies, and consumers, among others. A proximate cause was the rise in subprime lending. The percentage of lower-quality subprime mortgages originated during a given year rose from the historical 8% or lower range to approximately 20% from 2004 to 2006, with much higher ratios in some parts of the U.S. A high percentage of these subprime mortgages, over 90% in 2006 for example, were adjustable-rate mortgages. These two changes were part of a broader trend of lowered lending standards and higher-risk mortgage products. Further, U.S. households had become increasingly indebted, with the ratio of debt to disposable personal income rising from 77% in 1990 to 127% at the end of 2007, much of this increase mortgage-related.

When U.S. home prices declined steeply after peaking in mid-2006, it became more difficult for borrowers to refinance their loans. As adjustable-rate mortgages began to reset at higher interest rates (causing higher monthly payments), mortgage delinquencies soared. Securities backed with mortgages, including subprime mortgages, widely held by financial firms globally, lost most of their value. Global investors also drastically reduced purchases of mortgage-backed debt and other securities as part of a decline in the capacity and willingness of the private financial system to support lending. Concerns about the soundness of U.S. credit and financial markets led to tightening credit around the world and slowing economic growth in the U.S. and Europe.

The Dodd–Frank Wall Street Reform and Consumer Protection Act was passed in 2010 was a legislative response to the 2008 financial crisis (which the subprime mortgage crisis was a major part of) and the subsequent Great Recession. Dodd-Frank created the Consumer Financial Protection Bureau (CFPB), an independent agency of the United States government responsible for consumer protection in the financial sector. Its jurisdiction includes banks, credit unions, securities firms, payday lenders, mortgage-servicing operations, foreclosure relief services, debt collectors and other financial companies operating in the United States.

== Provisions of the bill ==
This summary is based largely on the summary provided by the Congressional Research Service, a public domain source.

The Mortgage Choice Act of 2013 would amend the Truth in Lending Act with respect to requirements for disclosure to a consumer of points and fees information about a consumer credit transaction, secured by the consumer's principal dwelling, but which is not a residential mortgage transaction, a reverse mortgage transaction, or a transaction under an open end credit plan, when the total points and fees the consumer must pay at or before closing will exceed 8% of the total loan amount or $400, whichever is greater. (Such consumer credit transactions might include an equity credit line to which consumer purchases or leases may be charged.)

The bill would exclude from the computation of such points and fees any escrow for future payment of insurance.

The bill would modify the criteria for exclusion from the computation of points and fees of certain reasonable charges elsewhere exempted from the computation of the finance charge in extensions of credit secured by an interest in real property. Excludes from points and fees any such reasonable charges even though a creditor receives compensation, but only in so far as the creditor or its affiliate retains the compensation as a result of their participation in an affiliated business arrangement.

(An "affiliated business arrangement" is one in which: (1) a person who is in a position to refer business incident to or a part of a real estate settlement service involving a federally related mortgage loan, or an associate of such person, has either an affiliate relationship with or a direct or beneficial ownership interest of more than 1% in a provider of settlement services; and (2) either of such persons directly or indirectly refers such business to that provider or affirmatively influences the provider's selection.)

The bill would revise the additional requirement that such a reasonable charge be paid to a third party unaffiliated with the creditor. Requires the charge to be: (1) a bona fide third party charge not retained by the mortgage originator, creditor, or an affiliate; or (2) a fee or premium for title examination, title insurance, or similar purposes.

The bill would modify the conditions under which federal departments and agencies may exempt refinancings under a streamlined refinancing from an income verification requirement that, at the time a refinancing is consummated, the consumer has a reasonable ability to repay the loan and all applicable taxes, insurance, and assessments. Repeals the exception for bona fide third party charges not retained by the mortgage originator, creditor, or an affiliate from the requirement that total points and fees not exceed 3% of the total new loan amount. (Thus subjects such charges to the same 3% ceiling.)

== Congressional Budget Office report ==
This summary is based largely on the summary provided by the Congressional Budget Office, as ordered reported by the House Committee on Financial Services on May 5, 2014. This is a public domain source.

The Congressional Budget Office (CBO) estimates that enacting H.R. 3211 would affect direct spending; therefore, pay-as-you-go procedures apply. However, we expect those effects would be insignificant. Enacting H.R. 3211 would not affect revenues or discretionary spending.

Under new rules issued by the Consumer Financial Protection Bureau (CFPB) for qualified mortgages, certain costs that are incidental to the loan amount and paid by the borrower—for example, title insurance fees, guarantee fees, and service charges—are limited to no more than 3 percent of the total loan amount. (A qualified mortgage must meet certain requirements with regard to the borrower’s ability to repay the loan and the loan terms.) H.R. 3211 would exclude insurance held in escrow and, under certain circumstances, fees paid to companies affiliated with the creditor from the costs that would be considered in calculating the 3 percent limitation. H.R. 3211 would direct the CFPB to amend its regulations related to qualified mortgages to reflect the new exclusions. Based on information from the agency, CBO does not expect that meeting the new requirement would have a significant effect on the agency’s workload.

H.R. 3211 contains no intergovernmental or private-sector mandates as defined in the Unfunded Mandates Reform Act and would impose no costs on state, local, or tribal governments.

== Procedural history ==
The Mortgage Choice Act of 2013 was introduced into the United States House of Representatives on September 28, 2013 by Rep. Bill Huizenga (R, MI-2). It was referred to the United States House Committee on Financial Services. The House voted on June 9, 2014 to pass the bill in a voice vote.

== Debate and discussion ==
The National Association of Federal Credit Unions (NAFCU) supported the bill calling it "bipartisan commonsense legislation." According to the NAFCU, the bill would make changes to a "troublesome definition" found in the Dodd–Frank Wall Street Reform and Consumer Protection Act that currently results in many affiliated loans not qualifying as Qualified Mortgages. According to the NAFCU, this leads to credit unions not offering such loans which causes consumers to "lose the ability to choose to take advantage of the convenience and market efficiencies offered by one-stop shopping."

== See also ==
- List of bills in the 113th United States Congress
- Real estate bubble
- 2008 financial crisis
