= Electrify Africa Act of 2013 =

- Long title: To establish a comprehensive United States Government policy to assist countries in sub-Saharan Africa to develop an appropriate mix of power solutions for more broadly distributed electricity access in order to support poverty alleviation and drive economic growth, and for other purposes.
- Announced in: the 113th United States Congress
- Sponsored by: Rep. Edward R. Royce (R, CA-39)
- Number of co-sponsors: 3

Codification
- Acts affected: Foreign Assistance Act of 1961, Inspector General Act of 1978
- U.S.C. sections affected: 22 U.S.C. § 2193, 22 U.S.C. § 2195, 22 U.S.C. § 2194, 22 U.S.C. § 2199, 5 U.S.C., and others.
- Agencies affected: Overseas Private Investment Corporation, United States Trade and Development Agency, United States Agency for International Development, Executive Office of the President, Millennium Challenge Corporation, United States Congress, United States Department of the Treasury

Legislative history
- Introduced in the House as H.R. 2548 by Rep. Edward R. Royce (R, CA-39) on June 27, 2013; Committee consideration by United States House Committee on Foreign Affairs, United States House Committee on Financial Services

The Electrify Africa Act of 2013 (H.R. 2548) is a bill that would direct the President to establish a multiyear strategy to assist countries in sub-Saharan Africa develop an appropriate mix of power solutions to provide sufficient electricity access to people living in rural and urban areas in order to alleviate poverty and drive economic growth.

The bill was introduced into the United States House of Representatives during the 113th United States Congress.

== Background ==
According to the ONE Campaign, 589 million people in sub-Saharan Africa lack access to electricity. The lack of electricity makes it difficult or impossible for some healthcare facilities to store drugs (that need to be chilled to certain temperatures, for example) or use life-saving equipment. The lack of electricity also limits business growth, forces people to spend time looking for fuel sources, exposes people to harmful fumes from indoor fires used for cooking, heating, and lighting, and limits safety (due to a lack of night time lighting and telephones).

The lack of electricity in sub-Saharan Africa is considered the "main constraint that hampers both growth and development."

The bill is considered complementary to the "Power Africa" project of President Barack Obama.

== Provisions of the bill ==
This summary is based largely on the summary provided by the Congressional Research Service, a public domain source.

The Electrify Africa Act of 2013 would direct the President to establish a multiyear strategy to assist countries in sub-Saharan Africa develop an appropriate mix of power solutions to provide sufficient electricity access to people living in rural and urban areas in order to alleviate poverty and drive economic growth.

The bill would express the sense of Congress that the U.S. Agency for International Development (USAID) should: (1) prioritize where loan guarantees to African financial institutions would facilitate involvement in African power projects, and where partnerships and grants would increase access to electricity; and (2) consider providing grants to develop national, regional, and local energy and electricity policy plans, and expand electricity access to the poorest.

The bill would urge: (1) the United States Secretary of the Treasury to use U.S. influence at each institution in the World Bank Group and the African Development Bank to encourage power sector and electrification investments in sub-Saharan Africa, (2) the Overseas Private Investment Corporation (OPIC) to prioritize investment in the electricity sector of sub-Saharan Africa, and (3) the Trade and Development Agency to promote U.S. private sector participation in energy sector development projects in sub-Saharan Africa.

== Congressional Budget Office report ==
This summary is based largely on the summary provided by the Congressional Budget Office, a public domain source.

H.R. 2548 would extend through 2017 the authority of the Overseas Private Investment Corporation (OPIC) to provide loans and insurance to help U.S. companies invest and expand in overseas markets. It also would require the Administration to encourage the private sector, other nations, international organizations, and nonprofits to increase access to electricity in sub-Saharan Africa. The Congressional Budget Office (CBO) estimates that implementing the legislation would save $86 million over the 2014-2019 period, assuming appropriation actions consistent with the bill. Pay-as-you-go procedures do not apply because enacting this legislation would not affect direct spending or revenues.

== Procedural history ==
The Electrify Africa Act of 2013 was introduced into the United States House of Representatives on June 27, 2013, by Rep. Edward R. Royce (R, CA-39). The bill was referred to the United States House Committee on Foreign Affairs and the United States House Committee on Financial Services. On May 2, 2014, the bill was reported (amended) alongside House Report 113-433 part 1. The bill was scheduled to be voted on under suspension of the rules on May 7, 2014.

== Debate and discussion ==
The international non-profit and advocacy group the ONE Campaign supported the bill, saying that "this legislation is a bold vision for U.S. engagement in the energy sector in Africa." Representative Mo Brooks (R-AL) opposed the bill. At a meeting of the House Foreign Affairs Committee, Brooks said "American taxpayers spend more than $40 billion per year on foreign aid... Given America's out-of-control deficits and accumulated debt that threaten our economic future, I cannot justify American taxpayers building power plants and transmission lines in Africa with money we do not have, will have to borrow to get, and cannot afford to pay back."

When the legislation was introduced in 2015, some criticism centered around the bill's failure to provide specifics on a plan to prioritize renewable energy and off-grid projects most affected by energy poverty. Anhvinh Doanvo of the Huffington Post, after noting what he claimed were the issues associated with proliferating fossil fuels throughout Africa and the likely outcomes of the plan, said "Instead of demonstrating Congress's resolve, the Electrify Africa Act has merely demonstrated that Congressmen neither know much about nor have a plan for Africa's energy industries."

== See also ==
- List of bills in the 113th United States Congress
- Rural electrification
