= Andy Barr =

American politician (born 1973)

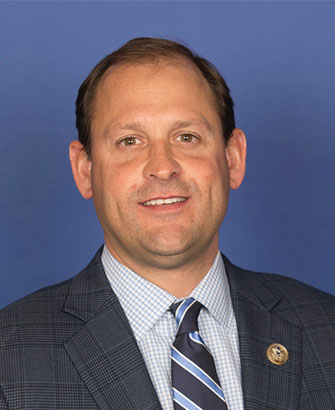
- Official portrait, 2018

United States Senator-elect from Kentucky
- Assuming office January 3, 2027
- Succeeding: Mitch McConnell

Member of the U.S. House of Representatives from Kentucky's 6th district
- Incumbent
- Assumed office January 3, 2013
- Preceded by: Ben Chandler

Personal details
- Born: Garland Hale Barr IV; July 24, 1973 (age 53) Lexington, Kentucky, U.S.
- Party: Republican
- Spouses: Eleanor Leavell (m. 2008; died 2020); Davis Huffman (m. 2023)
- Children: 4
- Education: University of Virginia (BA); University of Kentucky (JD)
- Website: House website Campaign website
- Barr's voice Barr supporting the Uyghur Forced Labor Prevention Act. Recorded December 14, 2021.

Garland Hale "Andy" Barr IV (born July 24, 1973) is an American attorney and politician who is a United States senator-elect from Kentucky. A member of the Republican Party, he has served as the U.S. representative for Kentucky's 6th congressional district since 2013.

Barr was first elected to Congress in 2012. Barr ran for Senate in 2026, winning the election and succeeding retiring incumbent Mitch McConnell.

== Early life and education ==
Barr was born in Lexington, Kentucky, the son of Garland Hale Barr III and Rev. Donna R. (Faulconer) Barr. The Barr family has been in Lexington for generations, and Barr Street in that city is reportedly named for one of Barr's ancestors. His father founded two companies in Lexington: the accounting firm Barr, Anderson and Roberts PLLC, and Merrick Management, Inc., a physician practice firm. His mother is a deacon in the Episcopal Diocese of Lexington. Barr graduated from Henry Clay High School in Lexington, Kentucky, in 1992. In 1993, Barr was charged by police with possession of a fake Mississippi driver's license in Key West, Florida. He pleaded guilty and was ordered to do community service, according to court records. Ten years later, when Barr applied for state jobs under Governor Ernie Fletcher, he checked "No" on the sections asking whether he had "ever been convicted of violating any law."

Barr graduated magna cum laude, Phi Beta Kappa from the University of Virginia in 1996 with a B.A. in government and philosophy. As a contributor to the conservative campus publication The Virginia Advocate, he was highly critical of then-President Bill Clinton for allegedly evading the draft. While in college, he was also an intern for U.S. senator Mitch McConnell, the Republican National Committee, and the Heritage Foundation; he called McConnell a 'mentor'. He was also a member of Sigma Alpha Epsilon.

From 1996 until 1998, he worked as a legislative assistant to Jim Talent, then a U.S. representative from Missouri, where he staffed Talent's service on the Speaker's Health Care Reform Task Force. In 2001, Barr earned a J.D. degree from the University of Kentucky College of Law. He was president of the Federalist Society at UK Law and was chosen to compete on the Moot Court National Team.

== Law career ==
Commencing practice in Lexington, Barr joined the Fayette County Bar Association Young Lawyers Section and co-founded the Lexington Charity Club, a nonprofit organization of young men raising money for charitable causes, with Lee Greer and Rob Lewis. In 2002, he joined the liability defense service group and the business litigation service group at the Lexington law firm Stites & Harbison. While there, he worked for former Democratic Kentucky attorney general and future governor of Kentucky Steve Beshear, who urged him to get involved in state politics. Barr and colleague Brad Cowgill were employed by Republican gubernatorial candidate Ernie Fletcher in 2003 to fight charges that Fletcher's running mate, Hunter Bates, did not meet the state's residency requirements for eligibility for the office of lieutenant governor. A judge ruled against Bates, and he was dropped from the ticket.

=== Fletcher administration ===
After Fletcher won the election, Barr was named to Fletcher's transition team in the Public Protection and Regulation Cabinet. Fletcher chose Barr as general counsel for the governor's office of local development. When Fletcher declared April Child Abuse Prevention Month in Kentucky, Barr wrote Fletcher's speech for the occasion. While researching the speech, he made contact with the nonprofit group Prevent Child Abuse in Kentucky. He became interested in the organization's mission and was elected to its board of directors in 2004; he served as its vice president in 2007 and president in 2008 and 2009.

Fletcher's term in office was marred by a hiring scandal that involved violations of the state merit system. Barr was not implicated in the scandal; he told the Lexington Herald-Leader that Fletcher's Local Initiatives for a New Kentucky (LINK) outreach program, a sub-unit of the office of local development, stopped recruiting and vetting individuals for merit positions in the executive branch after he briefed officials about an opinion issued by the Executive Branch Ethics Commission during the administration of Fletcher's predecessor, Paul E. Patton, regarding acceptable and unacceptable hiring under the merit system. The Herald-Leader later requested copies of any employment recommendations made by LINK employees, but Barr refused the request, citing an exemption in Kentucky's Open Records Act that provides exemptions for "preliminary drafts, notes and correspondence" of state employees.

In 2007, Fletcher's general counsel resigned to become executive director of the Kentucky Bar Association; deputy general counsel David E. Fleenor was elevated to general counsel, and Barr replaced Fleenor as deputy general counsel. In this capacity, he authored a defense of Fletcher's executive order that the Ten Commandments be posted in the rotunda of the state capitol alongside other historical documents. Fletcher was defeated for reelection in 2007 and before his term expired, he named Barr to the state Public Advocacy Commission.

=== Post-Fletcher administration ===
In April 2008, Barr returned to private practice as an associate at the law firm Kinkead and Stilz; he also worked as a part-time instructor of constitutional law at the University of Kentucky. He was chosen as an alternate delegate to the 2008 Republican National Convention and served as vice president of the Fayette County Republican Party.

== U.S House of Representatives ==
=== Elections ===
==== 2010 ====
On November 10, 2009, Barr became the first Republican to formally announce that he would seek his party's nomination to challenge incumbent 6th district Democratic congressman Ben Chandler. In the announcement, he touted his opposition to the Patient Protection and Affordable Care Act (which Chandler had also opposed) and the American Clean Energy and Security Act (which Chandler supported). Barr's campaign raised far more money than those of any of his five opponents in the Republican primary. Barr garnered 31,255 votes in the primary, while his opponents' totals ranged from 4,789 to 1,880.

In an interview with WKYT-TV in July, Barr denounced the recently signed Dodd–Frank Act that enacted new regulations on the banking industry. He called for an end to the practice of politicians earmarking funds for special projects in their districts, a position that put him at odds with state party leaders such as McConnell and long-time 5th district congressman Hal Rogers. He has supported strengthening security along the U.S. border with Mexico and has taken varying positions on birthright citizenship, at one point criticizing fellow Republican Senate candidate Rand Paul’s proposal as unconstitutional, and later introducing a constitutional amendment seeking to end birthright citizenship for children of undocumented immigrants.

The National Republican Congressional Committee targeted Barr's race against Chandler as part of its strategy to gain control of the House of Representatives during the 2010 midterm elections, and Ohio congressman John Boehner, who stood to become Speaker of the House if the Republicans gained a majority, visited the state to campaign for Barr. Substantial amounts of money from political groups outside the state aided both candidates and spawned a number of negative campaign ads. Chandler aired ads in August alluding to Barr's arrest in Florida for using a fake ID and seeking to tie him to the Fletcher administration's wrongdoing. Barr countered with ads criticizing Chandler's support of cap-and-trade legislation, an unpopular vote in coal-dependent Kentucky, and his vote in favor of the American Recovery and Reinvestment Act of 2009, which Barr characterized as a waste of taxpayer money that did little to stimulate an economic recovery.

Unofficial election day results showed Chandler narrowly defeating Barr, but the race was so close that Barr did not concede. When the official results were released, Chandler had received 119,812 (50.1%) votes to Barr's 119,163 (49.8%). Barr petitioned Kentucky secretary of state Trey Grayson for a recanvassing of the voting machines in the district, but this yielded only one additional vote for Barr. On November 12, ten days after the election, Barr announced that he would concede the election to Chandler rather than request a full recount.

==== 2012 ====
On June 9, 2011, Barr announced that he would again challenge Chandler for his seat in the 2012 elections. Chandler responded to the announcement by declaring, "Next year, voters will have a very simple choice to make: whether to protect and save Social Security and Medicare, or to end them," an allusion to Barr's publicly expressed support for Representative Paul Ryan's budget proposal.

In July 2012, Roll Call reported that "a wide swath of influential Republicans in Kentucky see Barr's campaign as something of a lost cause...In the eyes of those who know Kentucky best, from Washington, D.C., to Frankfort, this isn't much of a race right now."

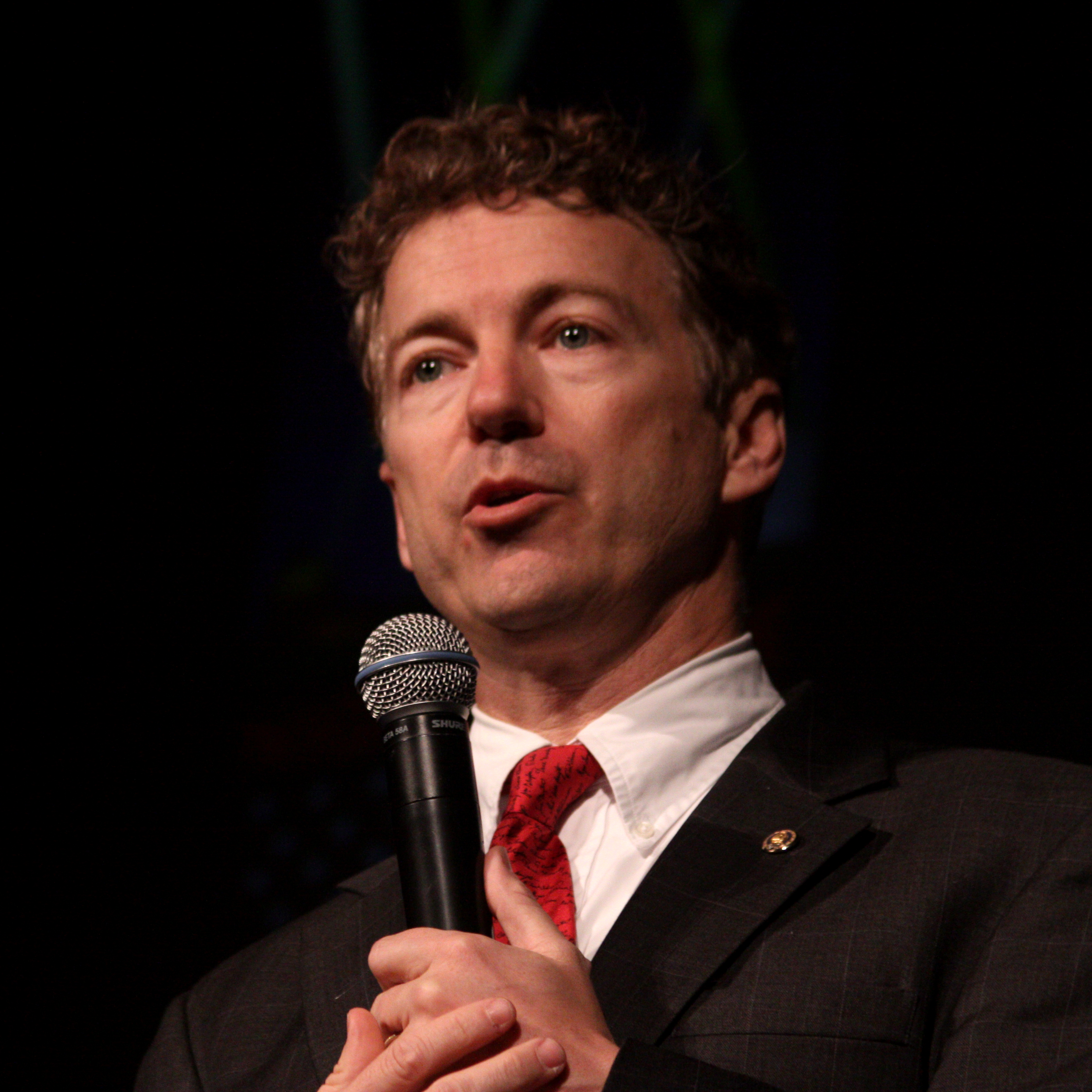
Rand Paul endorsed Barr in 2012 despite their differences on issues such as the Patriot Act.

Barr won the Republican primary and again received financial support from the National Republican Campaign Committee in his general election campaign. When Chandler decided not to attend the 2012 Democratic National Convention, Barr charged that he was trying to avoid association with President Barack Obama, who was seeking a second term and was unpopular in Kentucky. A spokesperson for Chandler maintained that Chandler had previous engagements in his home district that week, but that he supported Obama's reelection. Barr was chosen to give a brief address at the 2012 Republican National Convention, during which he decried Obama's perceived hostility toward the coal industry. Chandler campaign staffers criticized Barr's decision to attend the convention, saying that he should spend the time in his district, getting to know the people there better. They also mocked the fact that the backdrop for Barr's speech was a picture of the city of Louisville, which is not in the 6th district; Barr's campaign countered that they had no part in choosing the backdrop.

Both candidates began their TV ad campaigns with more positive ads; Barr's wife appeared in his first ad, touting him as a "family man", while Chandler tried to combat Barr's charges of fiscal liberalism by releasing an ad criticizing excessive government spending. Tea Party-backed Kentucky senator Rand Paul endorsed Barr despite their differences on some policy matters, including Barr's support for the Patriot Act. The positive tone did not hold as the race tightened. Chandler's campaign attacked Barr for using a mining executive from Morganfield, which is well outside the 6th district, as a coal miner from Estill County, which is in the district. The campaign's charges that the man depicted was "not a miner" prompted him to threaten a suit for defamation, and he produced copies of his certified miner credentials in rebuttal to the charge. The Democratic Congressional Campaign Committee also bought adverts that again raised the issue of Barr's previous conviction and his association with Fletcher.

Barr won the election by a vote of 153,222 (51%) to 141,436 (47%).

==== 2014 ====
Barr defeated Democratic nominee Elisabeth Jensen in the 2014 general election, by a vote of 147,404 (60%) to 98,290 (40%). Barr garnered wide support and raised substantial funds for the race.

==== 2016 ====
In the 2016 congressional elections, Democrat Rev. Nancy Jo Kemper, a graduate of Yale Divinity School and former executive director of the Kentucky Council of Churches, challenged Barr in the 6th Congressional District. She ran with the support of former lieutenant governor Crit Luallen, state senator Reggie Thomas, state representative Susan Westrom, and Secretary of State Alison Lundergan Grimes. Barr was reelected with 61.1% of the vote.

==== 2018 ====
Barr won the 2018 Republican primary. Former Marine fighter pilot Amy McGrath defeated Lexington mayor Jim Gray and state senator Reggie Thomas for the Democratic nomination. The race was considered potentially competitive by some observers. Barr defeated McGrath in the general election, 51% to 48%.

==== 2020 ====
Barr faced attorney and U.S. Marine veteran Josh Hicks. Barr defeated Hicks in the general election, 57.3% to 41%.

==== 2022 ====
Barr faced Democrat Geoff Young in the general election. Young came under fire for using Kremlin talking points while campaigning, most notably accusing the Ukrainian government of being run by "Nazis" following the Russian invasion of Ukraine. Young failed to receive the endorsement of the Kentucky Democratic Party after winning the Democratic primary. Barr won the general election 62.7% to 33.6%.

==== 2024 ====
Barr faced Democrat Randy Cravens, an IT professional and former write-in candidate for the 6th district in 2022. Barr defeated Cravens in the general election, 63% to 37%.

=== Tenure ===
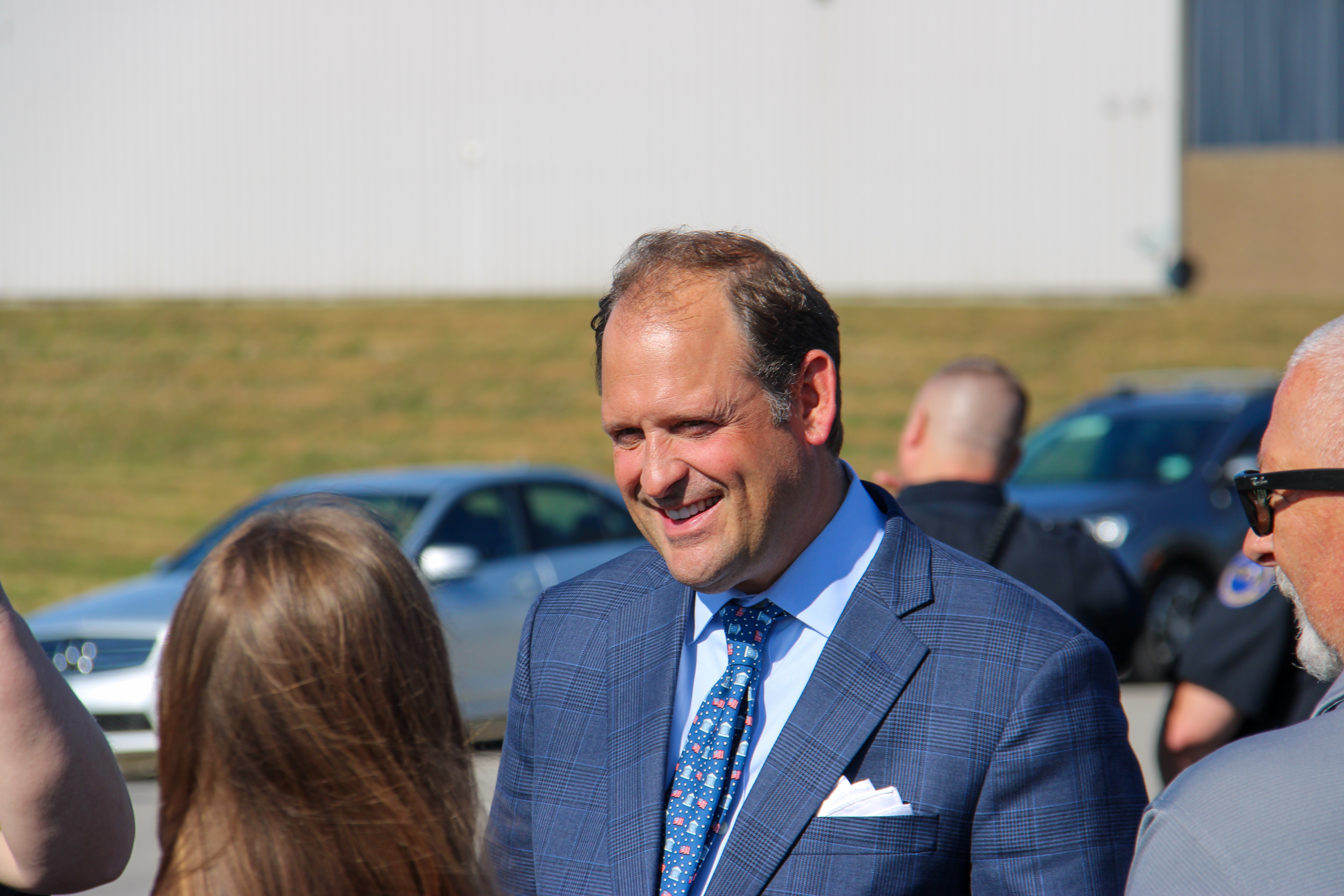
Congressman Andy Barr in Bourbon County, Kentucky, on October 30, 2024

Barr serves on the House Committee on Financial Services, and was the ranking member of the Subcommittee on National Security, International Development, and Monetary Policy. He also serves on the Republican Study Committee's (RSC) leadership team and chairs the RSC American Worker Task Force (AWTF). The RSC is the largest conservative caucus in Congress.

On July 11, 2013, Barr introduced the CFPB Rural Designation Petition and Correction Act (H.R. 2672; 113th Congress), a bill that would amend the Dodd-Frank Wall Street Reform and Consumer Protection Act to direct the Consumer Financial Protection Bureau (CFPB) to establish an application process that would allow a person to get their county designated as "rural" for purposes of a federal consumer financial law. One practical effect of having a county designated "rural" is that people can qualify for some types of mortgages by getting them exempted from the CFPB's qualified mortgage rule.

On March 6, 2014, Barr introduced the Restoring Proven Financing for American Employers Act (H.R. 4167; 113th Congress), a bill that would "exempt existing collateralized loan obligations from the so-called Volcker Rule, which bars banks from making risky trades with their own money and limits their investments in certain funds." The bill passed the House on April 29, 2014, in a voice vote.

In December 2017, Barr voted for the Tax Cuts and Jobs Act. He introduced the Preserving Access to Manufactured Housing Act, which passed and states that sellers of mobile homes are not loan or mortgage originators and are therefore not subject to the Truth in Lending Act.

Barr has taken part in legislation targeted at the opioid epidemic. In May 2018, he sponsored the CAREER Act, aimed at providing transitional housing for those recovering from opioid addiction. Barr also helped enact legislation to provide targeted response block grants to states suffering from the opioid epidemic. The grants would provide $500 million in funds for the epidemic up to fiscal year 2021. Barr was also key to the University of Kentucky being awarded $87 million by the Department of Health and Human Services as part of a HEAL (Helping to End Addiction Long-term) grant to provide help to Kentucky communities hit hardest by the opioid epidemic.

In April 2019, Barr introduced H.R. 2196, an amendment to change the required hours for the Edith Nourse Rogers STEM Scholarship program from 128 to 120. The bill passed and was signed into law by President Donald Trump in July 2019.

In April 2020, Barr was one of the first members of Congress to call for an investigation into the origins of COVID-19. He then introduced legislation to create a select committee to investigate the virus's origin. Barr reintroduced the bill in May 2021.

In May 2020, House Republican leader Kevin McCarthy appointed Barr to serve on the House of Representatives China Task Force. The task force was created to provide recommendations to the U.S. to better position itself against the emerging economic, political, military, and technological threat from the Chinese Communist Party (CCP). Barr was appointed co-chair of the subgroup on Competitiveness along with the subgroup on Economics and Energy.

In September 2020, Barr's Horseracing and Safety Act passed both the Senate and the House. The bill created the Horseracing Integrity and Safety Authority (HISA) for purposes of developing and implementing a horseracing anti-doping and medication control program and a racetrack safety program to ensure the sport's safety and integrity. The bill sets forth other provisions regarding funding, conflicts of interest, and jurisdiction; registration with the authority; program enforcement; rule violations and civil sanctions; testing laboratories; review of final decisions of the authority by an administrative law judge; unfair or deceptive acts or practices; and agreements with state racing commissions. Barr had been an author and advocate for the bill for over six years on the House side with Mitch McConnell advocating for the bill on the Senate side. In December 2022, Congress approved an amendment to the HISA Act that gave the bill legal grounds to be enacted after court challenges stalled its implementation. This amendment was signed into law on December 29, 2022.

In February 2021, Barr introduced the Cardiovascular Advances in Research and Opportunities Legacy (CAROL) Act. The bill was named in honor of Barr's late wife, Carol, who died in June 2020 of cardiac arrest caused by a ventricular arrhythmia. The bill authorizes a grant program administered by the National Heart, Lung, and Blood Institute (NHLBI), supporting research on valvular heart disease and encouraging the use of technological imaging and precision medicine to generate data on people with valvular disease. The bill also directs the NHLBI to conduct a workshop on mitral valve prolapse (MVP) in an effort to develop prescriptive guidelines for treatment of people with MVP. The American Heart Association and the American College of Cardiology endorsed the CAROL Act. On December 20, 2022, it was signed into law.

In November 2021, Barr introduced the Equine Tax Fairness Act. This bill modifies the tax treatment of gains and losses from the sale of depreciable property used in a trade or business to eliminate horses from the definition of livestock. This would reduce the holding period for equine assets to be considered long-term capital gains, putting them on a level playing field with other similar assets. The bill also makes permanent the three-year recovery period for the depreciation of racehorses. It has been endorsed by the National Thoroughbred Racing Association, the Kentucky Thoroughbred Association, the Jockey Club, the Thoroughbred Owners and Breeders Association, Keeneland, and the American Horse Council.

In February 2023, Barr introduced H.J. Res 30, which would have disapproved the Department of Labor's final rule titled "Prudence and Loyalty in Selecting Plan Investments and Exercising Shareholder Rights". The bill would have blocked environmental, social, and governance (ESG) investing in employer-sponsored retirement plans. On March 20, 2023, after passing the House and the Senate, the bill was vetoed by President Joe Biden, the first veto of Biden's tenure. Biden said he vetoed the bill because it did not "take into consideration investments that would be impacted by climate impacted by overpaying executives".

In March 2026, it was reported that Barr had expressed support for a statue of Mitch McConnell in the Kentucky Capitol rotunda in recognition of his long service in Kentucky.

=== Committee assignments ===
For the 118th Congress:

- Committee on Financial Services
  - Subcommittee on Financial Institutions and Monetary Policy (chairman)
  - Subcommittee on National Security, Illicit Finance and International Financial Institutions
- Committee on Foreign Affairs
  - Subcommittee on the Indo-Pacific
- Select Committee on Strategic Competition between the United States and the Chinese Communist Party

=== Caucus memberships ===
- Republican Study Committee
  - Chairman of the RSC American Worker Task Force
- Congressional Horse Caucus (co-chair)
- Congressional Bourbon Caucus (co-chair)

== 2026 U.S. Senate campaign ==
On April 22, 2025, Barr announced his intention to run for the U.S. Senate seat being vacated by Mitch McConnell in 2026. On November 7, 2025, he filed his candidacy paperwork for the race.

In February 2026, Barr's campaign released a television advertisement criticizing DEI. In the ad Barr said "It's not a sin to be White, it's not against the law to be male and it shouldn't be disqualifying to be a Christian." In February 2026, Barr's Senate campaign office in Lexington was damaged by a person being sought by local police, according to a statement from his team and law enforcement.

Barr later received endorsements from President Donald Trump and former Senate candidate Nate Morris, who withdrew from the race after being appointed an ambassador. Barr won the Republican nomination, defeating former state attorney general and 2023 Republican gubernatorial nominee Daniel Cameron with 283,720 votes (60.5%).

== Political positions ==
=== Health care ===
Barr supports the repeal of the Patient Protection and Affordable Care Act (also known as Obamacare).

=== Abortion ===
Barr is anti-abortion. He believes that abortion should be illegal in all cases except for if the mother's life is threatened. Barr opposes using federal funding to support organizations that offer abortions. In a 2012 interview, he said, "I think the vast majority of people of this country have come to the conclusion that wherever you are on this issue, we shouldn't have taxpayer funding for abortion."

=== LGBT rights ===
In the 114th Congress, Barr had a zero score from LGBT rights advocacy organization the Human Rights Campaign. In 2015, he opposed the Supreme Court ruling Obergefell v. Hodges, which held that same-sex marriage bans violate the Constitution.

=== Donald Trump ===
Barr said President Donald Trump's comments in the wake of the 2017 Unite the Right rally in Charlottesville, Virginia, were filled with "too much ambiguity."

Amid the Trump–Ukraine scandal, where an impeachment inquiry was launched into Trump after he requested that the Ukrainian president investigate 2020 Democratic presidential candidate Joe Biden, Barr defended Trump's actions, characterizing his request of the Ukrainian president as "routine diplomacy".

On December 18, 2019, Barr voted against both articles of impeachment against Trump.

On January 13, 2021, Barr voted against Trump's second impeachment, although Barr described Trump's rhetoric prior to the Capitol riots as "regrettable and irresponsible". He also said the president "bears some responsibility" in the matter and that he is "not blameless."

=== Environment and energy ===
Of climate change, Barr said in 2019, "Some say the science is settled. That's not true. There are scientists who dispute the level of warming, the extent to which humans are contributing to that." In 2013, Barr said, "Coal does contribute to climate change." Barr opposes a carbon tax.

In 2019, Barr invited Alexandria Ocasio-Cortez to his district to hear how the Green New Deal, of which Ocasio-Cortez is a leading proponent, would affect coal miners. Ocasio-Cortez accepted the invitation. Shortly thereafter, Barr withdrew his invitation, citing her "lack of civility" toward Dan Crenshaw. Ocasio-Cortez responded that Barr was waffling.

=== Israel ===
Barr has generally been supportive of Israel, particularly following the October 7 attacks and the subsequent Gaza war. In the war's first months, he voted for a motion that declared the House of Representatives' solidarity with Israel and wrote an op-ed for the Lexington Herald-Leader in which he advocated for Israel's interests over those of Hamas and Palestinian civilians. In 2024, he exhorted Secretary of State Antony Blinken not to accept the International Criminal Court's finding that Israeli security forces had credibly broken international laws and praised Israeli prime minister Benjamin Netanyahu's address to a joint session of Congress, professing the intertwining of American and Israeli interests and the necessity of the countries working together to "defeat Hamas and other Iranian proxies."

== Electoral history ==
Kentucky 6th Congressional District Republican Primary, 2010
Party	Candidate	Votes	%
Republican	Garland "Andy" Barr	31,255	63.93
Republican	Mike Templeman	4,789	9.80
Republican	Matt Lockett	4,070	8.33
Republican	John T. Kemper III	3,454	7.07
Republican	George Pendergrass	3,438	7.03
Republican	Perry Wilson Barnes	1,880	3.85
Total votes		48,886	100.0

Kentucky 6th Congressional District General Election, 2010
Party	Candidate	Votes	%
Democratic	Ben Chandler (incumbent)	119,812	50.08
Republican	Garland "Andy" Barr	119,164	49.81
Write-in votes	C. Wes Collins	225	0.09
Write-in votes	Randolph S. Vance	22	0.01
Total votes		239,223	100.0

Kentucky 6th Congressional District Republican Primary, 2012
Party	Candidate	Votes	%
Republican	Garland "Andy" Barr	20,104	82.80
Republican	Patrick J. Kelly II	2,823	11.63
Republican	Curtis Kenimer	1,354	5.58
Total votes		24,281	100.0

Kentucky 6th Congressional District General Election, 2012
Party	Candidate	Votes	%
Republican	Garland "Andy" Barr	153,222	50.57
Democratic	Ben Chandler (incumbent)	141,438	46.68
Independent	Randolph Vance	8,340	2.75
Total votes		303,000	100.0

Kentucky 6th Congressional District General Election, 2014
Party	Candidate	Votes	%
Republican	Andy Barr (incumbent)	147,404	59.99
Democratic	Elisabeth Jensen	98,290	40.01
Total votes		245,694	100.0

Kentucky 6th Congressional District Republican Primary, 2016
Party	Candidate	Votes	%
Republican	Andy Barr (incumbent)	25,212	84.55
Republican	Roger Q. Brill	4,608	15.45
Total votes		29,820	100.0

Kentucky 6th Congressional District General Election, 2016
Party	Candidate	Votes	%
Republican	Andy Barr (incumbent)	202,099	61.09
Democratic	Nancy Jo Kemper	128,728	38.91
Total votes		330,827	100.0

Kentucky 6th Congressional District Republican primary, 2018
Party	Candidate	Votes	%
Republican	Andy Barr (incumbent)	40,514	83.76
Republican	Chuck Eddy	7,858	16.24
Total votes		48,372	100.0

Kentucky 6th Congressional District general election, 2018
Party	Candidate	Votes	%
Republican	Andy Barr (incumbent)	154,468	51.00
Democratic	Amy McGrath	144,736	47.79
Libertarian	Frank Harris	2,150	0.71
Independent	Rikka L. Wallin	1,011	0.33
Independent	James Germalic	523	0.17
Total votes		302,888	100.0

Kentucky 6th Congressional District Republican Primary, 2020
Party	Candidate	Votes	%
Republican	Andy Barr (incumbent)	62,706	90.7
Republican	Chuck Eddy	3,636	5.3
Republican	Geoff Young	2,765	4.0
Total votes		69,107	100.0

Kentucky's 6th Congressional District, 2020
Party	Candidate	Votes	%
Republican	Andy Barr (incumbent)	216,948	57.3
Democratic	Josh Hicks	155,011	41.0
Libertarian	Frank Harris	6,491	1.7
Total votes		378,450	100.0

Kentucky 6th Congressional District Republican Primary, 2022
Party	Candidate	Votes	%
Republican	Andy Barr (incumbent)	47,659	87.8
Republican	Derek Petteys	6,593	12.2
Total votes		54,252	100.0

Kentucky's 6th Congressional District General Election, 2022
Party	Candidate	Votes	%
Republican	Andy Barr (incumbent)	154,539	62.9
Democratic	Geoff Young	82,897	33.7
Democratic	Randy Cravens	8,340	3.4
Total votes		245,844	100.0

Kentucky's 6th Congressional District General Election, 2024
Party	Candidate	Votes	%
Republican	Andy Barr (incumbent)	222,293	63.0
Democratic	Randy Cravens	130,345	37.0
Total votes		352,638	100.0
Republican hold			

== Personal life ==
In 2008, Barr married Eleanor Carol Leavell of Georgetown, Kentucky, who previously served as the executive director of the Henry Clay Center for Statesmanship. They had two daughters. Barr's wife died unexpectedly on June 16, 2020, at age 39, from ventricular arrhythmia caused by a heart condition known as mitral valve prolapse, at the family's home in Lexington.

In April 2023, Barr married Davis Huffman. Together, they share a son and a daughter.

Barr is an Episcopalian.

U.S. House of Representatives
Preceded by Ben Chandler	Member of the U.S. House of Representatives from Kentucky's 6th congressional district 2013–present	Incumbent
Party political offices
Preceded by Mitch McConnell	Republican nominee for U.S. Senator from Kentucky (Class 2); 2026	Most recent
U.S. Senate
Preceded by Mitch McConnell	U.S. Senator (Class 2) from Kentucky; Taking office 2027; Served alongside: Rand Paul	Elect
U.S. order of precedence (ceremonial)
Preceded by Dina Titus	United States representatives by seniority 98th	Succeeded by Joyce Beatty
