= Credit Union National Extension Bureau =

The Credit Union National Extension Bureau (CUNEB) was the organization that advocated for and fostered credit unions in the United States from 1921 until 1934. CUNEB laid the foundation for the Credit Union National Association (CUNA) and the Federal Credit Union Act. CUNEB was organized and funded by Edward Filene, managed by Roy Bergengren, and was largely responsible for the proliferation of credit unions in the United States.

== History ==
In the early 20th century, many ordinary American workers did not have access to loans when they needed them and fell victim to usury and loan sharks. Inspired by cooperative banks in India, American businessman Edward Filene began advocating for credit union legislation in Massachusetts in 1908. The Massachusetts Credit Union Act of 1909 was signed into law and credit unions were formed throughout the state. Filene organized the National Association of Peoples Banks to advance the credit union cause in the United States. Little progress was made until 1921, when Filene observed in Roy Bergengren the key organizer he needed. Together with Bergengren he founded the Credit Union National Extension Bureau. The Extension Bureau had four goals:

1. to bring about the laws needed for credit union development in the various states,
2. subsequently, to organize some credit unions in each state that could serve as examples to others,
3. to expand the number of credit unions to the point that they could create self-sustaining state federations, and
4. to combine the federations into a self-sustaining national association.

In June 1924, the Extension Bureau began publishing The Bridge, a precursor to Credit Union Magazine of which Bergengren was the editor. Bergengren travelled the country and attended the meetings of credit union organizers. He appeared before state legislators and recruited volunteer organizers. Laws were passed and the Extension Bureau began to realize its goals. When Bergengren started what he referred to as his "crusade" in 1921, there were only 199 credit unions in the U.S. By 1925, 15 states had passed credit union laws and 419 credit unions were serving 108,000 members.

The collaboration between Bergengren and Filene, and the work of the Extension Bureau, proved very effective. It eventually brought state laws to fruition in 26 states and substantially revised flawed legal frameworks in 5 others. In 1934 the Roosevelt Administration passed the Federal Credit Union Act, making it possible to form a credit union anywhere in the United States.

The Extension Bureau has been a model for many projects related to international development and microfinance since. Foreshadowing debates that still rage however, the views of Filene and Bergengren diverged on two key issues.

First, Bergengren believed that the Extension Bureau should attempt to secure federal legislation first, rather than work state by state. Filene prevailed in this debate, maintaining that a national law should be based on a sound understanding of the diverse circumstances of people across America—from shrimp fishermen in Louisiana, to factory workers in Massachusetts or farmers in the mid-West. Only by developing many state laws first would such a sound national understanding be possible.

Second, as the Great Depression set in the Reconstruction Finance Corporation under President Hoover sought to stimulate the economy with soft loans targeted to banks, railways and large companies. Filene favoured asking for $100 million in reconstruction credits to be pumped into credit unions. Bergengren strongly opposed this position, and his view prevailed this time. "To him, it meant destroying the vital principle of the whole movement by converting a community enterprise into an agency of the government. To teach people how to help themselves was more important by far in times of depression than at any other time."

== Credit Union National Association ==
With the work of the Bureau essentially completed, a national meeting of credit union leaders was called at Estes Park, Colorado. In a letter to Edward Filene, Bergengren wrote "I sincerely believe that what we are going to do at Estes Park will have extraordinary consequences." On 11 August 1934 the Credit Union National Association (CUNA) – a national federation funded by the nation's credit unions – was formed to replace the Bureau.
