= National Association of Federally-Insured Credit Unions =

U.S. trade organization

National Association of Federally Insured Credit Unions
- Formation: 1967
- Location: Arlington County, Virginia, U.S.
- Chief executive officer: B. Dan Berger
- Parent organization: America's Credit Unions
- Website: www.nafcu.org

The National Association of Federally-Insured Credit Unions (NAFCU) is a U.S. trade organization representing the nation's federally-insured credit unions. The NAFCU hosts conferences, publishes original research on issues relating to the credit union industry, and provides testimony before the United States Congress on issues relating to credit unions and the financial services industry.

The organization was founded in 1967 and is headquartered in Arlington, Virginia. On August 1, 2023, the association's board of directors announced its intent to merge the association with the Credit Union National Association, forming a new entity called America's Credit Unions. The merger took effect in 2024, and NAFCU will operate under the America's Credit Unions banner until operations are integrated with CUNA's in 2025.

== Advocacy ==
The NAFCU supported the CFPB Rural Designation Petition and Correction Act (H.R. 2672; 113th Congress), a bill that would amend the Dodd–Frank Wall Street Reform and Consumer Protection Act to direct the Consumer Financial Protection Bureau (CFPB) to establish an application process that would allow a person to get their county designated as "rural" for purposes of a federal consumer financial law. One practical effect of having a county designated "rural" is that people can qualify for some types of mortgages by getting them exempted from the CFPB's qualified mortgage rule. The NAFCU argued that the bill "would be helpful to small creditors, including credit unions, offering mortgages with balloon-payment features in underserved areas, because it would allow them to satisfy the rule's 'ability to repay' requirements." The NAFCU thought that the application process described by this bill would make "the process for obtaining a rural designation fairer and more transparent."

The NAFCU supported the Credit Union Share Insurance Fund Parity Act (H.R. 3468; 113th Congress), a bill that would expand federal deposit insurance to include Interest on Lawyer Trust Accounts (IOLTAs) and similar escrow accounts housed within credit unions. Vice President of Legislative Affairs Brad Thaler said that "we applaud the committee for taking the steps today to advance regulatory relief for community institutions and hope that this will be the start of an ongoing effort." The NAFCU said that the bill "would advance parity for accounts in credit unions and banks protected by the National Credit Union Share Insurance Fund and FDIC Bank Insurance Fund," which "reflects a key element of NAFCU's five-point plan for credit union regulatory relief."

The NAFCU supported the Mortgage Choice Act of 2013 (H.R. 3211; 113 Congress), a bill that would direct the Consumer Financial Protection Bureau (CFPB) to amend its regulations related to qualified mortgages to reflect new exclusions made by this bill. The NAFCU called the bill "bipartisan commonsense legislation." According to the NAFCU, the bill would make changes to a "troublesome definition" found in the Dodd-Frank Wall Street Reform and Consumer Protection Act that currently results in many affiliated loans not qualifying as Qualified Mortgages. According to the NAFCU, this leads to credit unions not offering such loans, which causes consumers to "lose the ability to choose to take advantage of the convenience and market efficiencies offered by one-stop shopping."

== See also ==
- Credit Union National Association
- National Credit Union Administration
