= Restoring Proven Financing for American Employers Act =

- Long title: To amend section 13 of the Bank Holding Company Act of 1956, known as the Volcker Rule, to exclude certain debt securities of collateralized loan obligations from the prohibition against acquiring or retaining an ownership interest in a hedge fund or private equity fund.
- Announced in: the 113th United States Congress
- Sponsored by: Rep. Garland "Andy" Barr (R, KY-6)
- Number of co-sponsors: 0

Codification
- U.S.C. sections affected: 15 U.S.C. § 78c, 12 U.S.C. § 1851

Legislative history
- Introduced in the House as H.R. 4167 by Rep. Garland "Andy" Barr (R, KY-6) on March 6, 2014; Committee consideration by United States House Committee on Financial Services, United States Senate Committee on Banking, Housing, and Urban Affairs; Passed the House on April 29, 2014 (voice vote)

The Restoring Proven Financing for American Employers Act (H.R. 4167) is a bill that would "exempt existing collateralized loan obligations from the so-called "Volcker Rule," which bars banks from making risky trades with their own money and limits their investments in certain funds."

The bill passed in the United States House of Representatives during the 113th United States Congress.

== Provisions of the bill ==
This summary is based largely on the summary provided by the Congressional Research Service, a public domain source.

The Restoring Proven Financing for American Employers Act would amend the Bank Holding Company Act of 1956 with respect to certain prohibitions on proprietary trading by banking entities and certain relationships with hedge funds and private equity funds (Volcker Rule).

The bill would prohibit the Volcker Rule from being construed to require divestiture of any debt securities of collateralized loan obligations issued before January 31, 2014.

The bill would declare that a banking entity shall not be considered to have an ownership interest in a collateralized loan obligation because it acquires or retains a debt security in it if the debt security has no indicia of ownership other than the right of the banking entity to participate in the removal for cause, or in the selection of a replacement after removal for cause or resignation, of an investment manager or investment adviser of the collateralized loan obligation.

The bill would define "collateralized loan obligation" as any issuing entity of an asset-backed security composed primarily of commercial loans.

== Procedural history ==
The Restoring Proven Financing for American Employers Act was introduced into the United States House of Representatives on March 6, 2014 by Rep. Garland "Andy" Barr (R, KY-6). It was referred to the United States House Committee on Financial Services. The House voted on April 29, 2014 to pass the bill in a voice vote. The bill was received in the United States Senate on April 30, 2014 and referred to the United States Senate Committee on Banking, Housing, and Urban Affairs.

== Debate and discussion ==
The bill had "strong support from the banking industry," according to one newspaper. The Securities Industry and Financial Markets Association (SIFMA) supported the bill, applauding House passage. According to SIFMA, "the Fed's recently-announced guidance is far too limited in scope and fails to remediate the negative impact of the Volcker Rule on CLOs." SIFMA thought that H.R. 4167 was a "more comprehensive approach that makes the Volcker Rule workable while minimizing unnecessary disruptions to the market" that would "diminish the unnecessary losses that will be caused by the Fed's approach."

Rep. Barr, who introduced the bill, said that he was "glad that the House has come together to advance this common-sense solution that would ensure American employers are able to obtain affordable financing to expand their businesses and create much-needed jobs for Kentuckians."

According to the House Republican Conference, the collateralized loan obligation (CLO) divestment required by the Volcker Rule will "disrupt a market for business loans that have provided financing to companies such as Sears, JCPenney, DollarGeneral, Rite Aid, Regal Cinema, JCrew, Michael’s Craft Stores, Tempurpedic, Delta Airlines, and American Airlines." This rule would not go into effect if this bill passes. The House Republicans also state that "the historic default for CLOs is less than 1%."

== See also ==
- List of bills in the 113th United States Congress
