= Helping Expand Lending Practices in Rural Communities Act =

United States bill

CFPB Rural Designation Petition and Correction Act
- Long title: To amend the Dodd-Frank Wall Street Reform and Consumer Protection Act to provide for an application process for interested parties to apply for a county to be designated as a rural area, and for other purposes.
- Announced in: the 113th United States Congress
- Sponsored by: Rep. Garland "Andy" Barr (R, KY-6)
- Number of co-sponsors: 0

Codification
- Acts affected: Dodd-Frank Wall Street Reform and Consumer Protection Act
- U.S.C. sections affected: 12 U.S.C. § 5512
- Agencies affected: United States Department of Agriculture, Office of Management and Budget, Bureau of the Census, Bureau of Consumer Financial Protection

Legislative history
- Introduced in the House as H.R. 2672 by Rep. Garland "Andy" Barr (R, KY-6) on July 11, 2013; Committee consideration by United States House Committee on Financial Services, United States House Financial Services Subcommittee on Financial Institutions and Consumer Credit

The Helping Expand Lending Practices in Rural Communities Act (H.R. 2672) is a United States bill that would amend the Dodd-Frank Wall Street Reform and Consumer Protection Act to direct the Consumer Financial Protection Bureau (CFPB) to establish an application process that would allow a person to get their county designated as "rural" for purposes of a federal consumer financial law. One practical effect of having a county designated "rural" is that people can qualify for some types of mortgages by getting them exempted from the CFPB's qualified mortgage rule.

The bill was introduced in the United States House of Representatives during the 113th United States Congress.

== Background ==
The Consumer Financial Protection Bureau (CFPB) is an independent agency of the United States government responsible for consumer protection in the financial sector. Its jurisdiction includes banks, credit unions, securities firms, payday lenders, mortgage-servicing operations, foreclosure relief services, debt collectors and other financial companies operating in the United States.

The CFPB's creation was authorized by the Dodd–Frank Wall Street Reform and Consumer Protection Act, whose passage in 2010 was a legislative response to the 2008 financial crisis and the subsequent Great Recession.

== Provisions of the bill ==
This summary is based largely on the summary provided by the Congressional Research Service, a public domain source.

The CFPB Rural Designation Petition and Correction Act would amend the Dodd-Frank Wall Street Reform and Consumer Protection Act to direct the Consumer Financial Protection Bureau (CFPB) to establish an application process under which a person who lives or does business in a state may apply to have a county designated as a rural area for purposes of a federal consumer financial law.

The bill would prescribe criteria for the CFPB to consider when evaluating such an application.

The bill would require the CFPB to enter each such application into a sortable, downloadable database publicly accessible through its website.

== Procedural history ==
The CFPB Rural Designation Petition and Correction Act was introduced into the United States House of Representatives on July 11, 2013 by Rep. Garland "Andy" Barr (R, KY-6). The bill was referred to the United States House Committee on Financial Services and the United States House Financial Services Subcommittee on Financial Institutions and Consumer Credit. The bill was scheduled to be voted on under suspension of the rules on May 6, 2014.

== Debate and discussion ==
The National Association of Federal Credit Unions (NAFCU) supported the bill, arguing that the bill "would be helpful to small creditors, including credit unions, offering mortgages with balloon-payment features in underserved areas, because it would allow them to satisfy the rule’s 'ability to repay' requirements." The NAFCU thought that the application process described by this bill would make "the process for obtaining a rural designation fairer and more transparent."

The Conference of State Bank Supervisors (CSBS) wrote a letter in support of the bill, arguing that "certain aspects of lending should not be regulated with a nationwide, broad brush approach, and must necessarily provide for local flexibility." According to the CSBS, the current method of designating a county as "rural" is "formulaic" and is "inflexible when applied to counties with atypical population distributions or geographic boundaries" thus necessitating a more nuanced approach.

== See also ==
- List of bills in the 113th United States Congress
