= B. Dan Berger =

American artist and lobbyist

- Born: Allentown, Pennsylvania, U.S.
- Education: Florida State University; Harvard Kennedy School at Harvard University
- Occupations: President and CEO of the National Association of Federally-Insured Credit Unions
- Spouse: Aimee
- Children: Shelby

Brian Daniel (Dan) Berger (born 1966) is an economist and president and chief executive officer of the National Association of Federally-Insured Credit Unions.

== Early life and education ==
Berger was born in Allentown, Pennsylvania in 1966, and grew up in Gainesville, Florida, where he graduated from Buchholz High School. He has a BS degree in economics from Florida State University and a Master of Public Administration from Harvard Kennedy School. He is an adjunct professor of communication at George Washington University.

== Career ==
Berger has represented financial services organizations and companies, including Farm Bureau, Association of Realtors, FCCI Insurance Group (Florida Employers Exchange), Riscorp Insurance Co. and Insurance Data Resources, Inc. He was also co-founder and managing director of eCapital Group, a Sarasota, Florida venture capital fund focusing on financial services related software and technologies.

Berger is a veteran advisor of several local, state and national political campaigns. He served as chief of staff to U.S. Rep. Katherine Harris (R-FL) during the 108th Congress.

In 2004, Berger became vice president of government relations for America's Community Bankers, then executive vice president of government affairs for the National Association of Federally-Insured Credit Unions. Berger took over as president and chief executive officer of NAFCU August 2013.

Berger is an amateur painter specializing in abstract expressionism and has had several gallery shows, including in New York City and Washington, D.C. In addition, he is an avid outdoorsman and is active in several conservation groups and writes and contributes flyfishing and outdoor-related articles for Grant County Press newspaper and conservation publications.

Berger is also a contributing political analyst on Fox News and others.

For 12 years in a row, Berger has been selected by The Hill as one of the most influential lobbyists in Washington, D.C.

Berger and his wife Aimee have one daughter, Shelby.
