= Summit Credit Union =

American credit union

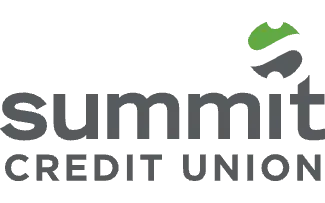
- Summit Credit Union Logo
- Type: Credit union
- Industry: Financial services
- Founded: 1935
- Headquarters: Cottage Grove, Wisconsin, USA
- Key people: Kim Sponem (CEO)
- Total assets: $8.8 billion USD
- Number of employees: 965
- Website: summitcreditunion.com

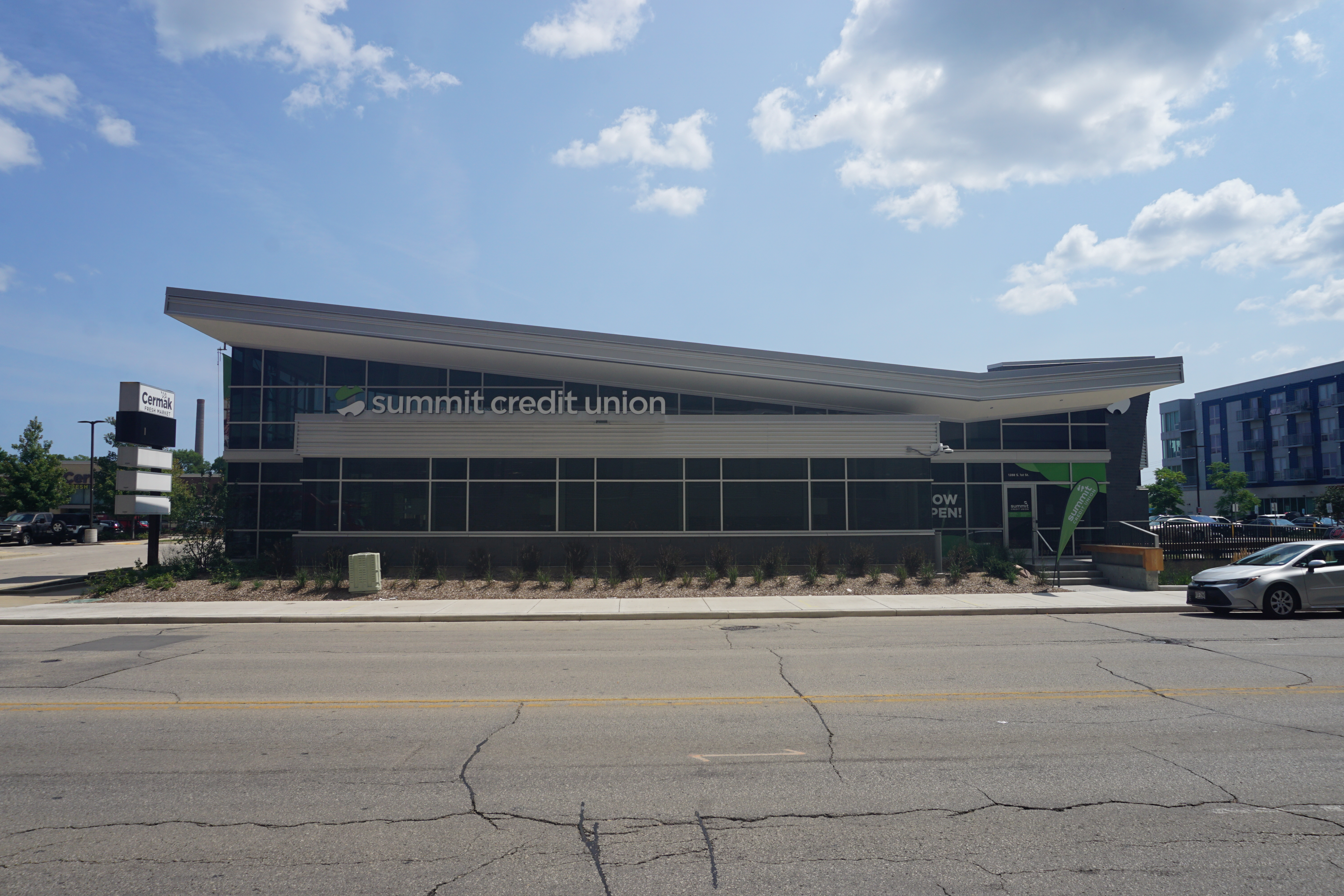
Summit Credit Union in Milwaukee

Summit Credit Union is a member-owned financial cooperative. Established in 1935, Summit holds $8.8 billion in assets and has more than 286,020 members and 965 employees across 58 locations throughout Wisconsin. Since 2002, Kim Sponem has been CEO & President of Summit Credit Union, formerly known as CUNA Credit Union/Great Wisconsin Credit Union.

In 2025, Summit was recognized for continued excellence in employee engagement as a Top Workplace USA by USA Today for the fifth consecutive year and a Top Workplace in the Madison area by the Wisconsin State Journal six years in a row. This marks the third straight year The Milwaukee Journal Sentinel has named Summit a Top Workplace in Milwaukee. Summit was also named to Forbes list of America’s Best-In-State Credit Unions 2025, as well as one of America’s Best Credit Unions by Newsweek. Additionally, and representative of its focus on financial education, Summit received the Governor’s Financial Literacy Award in 2010, 2014 and 2016 and the Governor’s Financial Literacy Award – Legacy in 2019.

== History ==
Kim Sponem, CEO & President of Summit Credit Union, has been a credit union CEO for more than 20 years, including the top job when Summit was named Great Wisconsin Credit Union and, originally, CUNA Credit Union.

CUNA, Inc. founded CUNA Credit Union, known today as Summit Credit Union, on September 17, 1935 in Madison, Wisconsin to serve the credit union movement and anyone else who was in need of credit union services. This unique charter was granted by the Wisconsin bank commissioner in 1935.

The first location was in its sponsor company, in the Filene House. Credit union movement pioneers and organizers Thomas Doig and Roy Bergengren were early advocates for the formation of CUNA Credit Union to ensure all people everywhere had access to credit union membership. Back then, employees of a credit union could not borrow from their credit union. The credit union was there to ensure that employees could still receive their product needs from a credit union and that state leagues across the country had access to a credit union for their banking needs.

Shortly after establishing this credit union, CUNA Mutual was formed to provide insurances and other services to credit unions and became one of its sponsor groups in addition to CUNA, Inc. The credit union expanded to other credit union entities as they were created, including World Council of Credit Unions (WOCCU), Credit Union Executive Society (CUES) and Filene and expanded to serve anyone, anywhere.

In 2005, CUNA Credit Union changed its name to Great Wisconsin Credit Union (GWCU) and then, in 2008, changed its name to Summit Credit Union, merging in the former Summit Credit Union, formerly State Capitol Employees Credit Union, maintaining CUNA/Great Wisconsin's original charter and field of membership.
