= Dan Berger (American academic) =

American historian

Dan Berger is an author, historian and professor at the University of Washington Bothell. His interests are critical race theory, prison studies, and contemporary social movements in the US, focused on prisons and "diverse ways in which imprisonment has shaped social movements, racism, and American politics since World War II." He received his Bachelor of Arts in interdisciplinary studies and Bachelor of Science in journalism from the University of Florida, and a doctorate in communications from the University of Pennsylvania.

Berger has written for Black Perspectives, Boston Review, Dissent, Jacobin, Truthout, Time, Salon.com and The Nation.

His books include:

- Captive Nation: Black Prison Organizing in the Civil Rights Era (2014) ISBN 9781469629797
- The Struggle Within: Prisons, Political Prisoners, and Mass Movements in the United States (2014) ISBN 9781629630113
- Rethinking the American Prison Movement (2017) ISBN 9781317662228
- Remaking Radicalism: A Grassroots Documentary Reader of the United States, 1973-2001 (2020) ISBN 9780820357256
- Stayed on Freedom (2023) ISBN 978-1541675360

Captive Nation was awarded the James A. Rawley Prize from the Organization of American Historians in 2015.
