= National Credit Union Foundation =

American nonprofit organization

- Abbreviation: the Foundation
- Formation: 1980
- Type: 501(c)(3)
- Purpose: "Making financial freedom achievable through credit unions."
- Headquarters: Madison, Wisconsin
- Executive Director: Gigi Hyland
- Budget: $5,809,644
- Website: ncuf.coop

The National Credit Union Foundation (the Foundation) is the charitable arm of America's credit union movement and works as a catalyst to improve people's financial lives through credit unions. The Foundation is an affiliate of the Credit Union National Association (CUNA) and is located in CUNA's offices in Madison, Wisconsin, as well as in Washington, DC. In 2015, the Foundation unveiled a new logo, shorthand ("the Foundation" in place of "NCUF") and website.

The Foundation is a 501(c)(3) tax-exempt charitable organization governed by a volunteer Board of Directors composed of executives from the credit union movement as well as an at-large representative.

Through grants and programs, the Foundation is working to strengthen financial well-being via Biz Kid$ and other programs, instilling knowledge about the credit union difference through the DE Program and other mechanisms, and uniting resources to help credit union people during disaster via CUAid.

== Programs ==
=== Credit Union Development Education (DE) Program ===
DE Training is an intensive program which provides lessons in cooperative principles, credit union philosophy and international development issues while incorporating current credit union challenges. During the week-long DE Training, participants are involved in group exercises, field trips, encouraged to ask questions of visiting speakers, and are required to complete team projects proposing solutions for credit unions to help alleviate or eliminate challenging situations in any given area. Since 1982, more than 1,600 credit union advocates from over 35 countries have graduated from the Foundation's DE Training to become Credit Union Development Educators (CUDEs). The Foundation now holds four trainings a year.

=== Financial Well-being ===
The Foundation works to help credit unions improve the financial well-being of their members through financial education, counseling, tools and other resources.

For example, the Foundation now offers:

- "Retire on Track", a Retirement Fair to assist credit unions with helping their members and staff better prepare for retirement;
- a "Life Simulation" kit, designed to help credit union employees, volunteers and leadership begin to understand what it might be like to live in a typical low-income family trying to survive from month to month;
- financial counseling training for credit union staff to become certified financial counselors via Enhanced FiCEP; and
- a variety of toolkits, including a recent one for credit unions to implement a non-prime auto lending program.

=== Biz Kid$ ===
Biz Kid$ is a PBS television series devoted to financial education for children. The overall objective of Biz Kid$ is to engage young people and help them develop life skills in the areas of financial literacy and entrepreneurship. The initiative includes an Emmy award-winning television series, free classroom curriculum, outreach activities, and a website targeting kids 9–16 years old. It is the first national public television series promoting financial education for elementary through high school students and was created by the same team that produced Bill Nye the Science Guy.

=== Disaster Relief/CU Aid ===
In times of disaster, the Foundation raises and distributes funds to aid credit unions, employees, volunteers and members in the affected region through its National Credit Union Foundation Disaster Relief Fund. For example, the Foundation raised over $3.5 million in the aftermath of Hurricane Katrina, a record for the credit union system. For disaster relief fundraising for the credit union system, the Foundation developed CU Aid, the credit union movement's first online disaster relief fundraising system.

== Fundraising ==
Financial support to the Foundation is provided by "corporate supporters" such as credit unions and credit union vendors, individual donors, and Community Investment Fund (CIF) investors. The Community Investment Fund is a partnership between the National Credit Union Foundation and state credit union leagues and foundations. Credit unions invest in a Community Investment Fund account with either the National Cooperative Bank, MEMBERS Trust Company, or a designated corporate credit union. The return on the investment is split between the credit union, the Foundation, and the investing state's credit union league or foundation. Proceeds from the fund are then used to fund a variety of the National Credit Union Foundation's national programs as well as state credit union league and foundation development initiatives.

== Charity rating ==
According to the BBB Wise Giving Alliance, the National Credit Union Foundation "meets the BBB Standards for Charity Accountability."
