= Credit Union National Association =

U.S. trade association

- Abbreviation: CUNA
- Successor: America's Credit Unions
- Founded: 1934; 92 years ago
- Type: 501(c)(6)
- Tax ID no.: 23-7065623
- Purpose: Professional association
- Headquarters: Washington, D.C., U.S.
- Location: Madison, Wisconsin, U.S.
- Coordinates: 38.876451°N 77.006228°W
- President: Jim Nussle
- Parent organization: America's Credit Unions
- Subsidiaries: CUNA Strategic Services Inc
- Website: www.cuna.org

The Credit Union National Association (CUNA, pronounced "Cue-Nuh"), was a national trade association for both state- and federally chartered credit unions located in the United States. CUNA provided member credit unions with trade association services, such as lobbying, regulatory advocacy, professional development, and professional services management. The organization operated out of its headquarters in Washington, D.C., and an operations center in Madison, Wisconsin. CUNA's president and chief executive officer Jim Nussle led the organization since September 2014 and now leads its successor organization, America's Credit Unions.

CUNA was founded at a meeting in Estes Park, Colorado as a replacement for the Credit Union National Extension Bureau. The first director was Roy F. Bergengren.

== America’s Credit Unions ==
On August 1, 2023, the association’s board of directors announced its intent to merge the association with the National Association of Federally-Insured Credit Unions, forming a new entity called America's Credit Unions. The merger became effective as of 2024 and longtime CUNA CEO Jim Nussle is the president and CEO of the new association.

== Services and support ==
CUNA is supported through dues paid by credit unions through their local league dues and fees generated from services provided. CUNA has previously operated a for-profit "CUNA Services Corp." However, many of the pass-through services, such as credit card processing and individual retirement account (IRA) administration, have been sold to other vendors.

CUNA also houses eight CUNA Councils - national organizations for credit union professionals. Run by and for credit union professionals, Councils target their networking, information and programs to key areas of credit union management.

Prior to 2016, a credit union was required to be a member of its local state credit union league in order to qualify for benefits and services from CUNA, but that is no longer a requirement.

== Employees and locations ==
CUNA employs 295 people in its offices in Washington, D.C., and Madison, Wisconsin. The Madison campus is also the headquarters of CUNA Mutual Group, the World Council of Credit Unions, and the National Credit Union Foundation.

== Advocacy ==
On December 4, 2013, Rose Bartolomucci testified before the United States House Financial Services Subcommittee on Financial Institutions and Consumer Credit on behalf of CUNA in favor of the bill To amend the Federal Home Loan Bank Act to authorize privately insured credit unions to become members of a Federal home loan bank (H.R. 3584; 113th Congress). The bill H.R. 3584 is a bill that would amend the Federal Home Loan Bank Act to treat certain privately insured credit unions as insured depository institutions for purposes of determining eligibility for membership in a federal home loan bank. Bartolomucci emphasized that the bill does not guarantee membership to individual credit unions, but only the right to apply for membership. Bartolomucci argued that being able to join the Federal Home Loan Bank System would allow credit unions to better serve their members by providing them with additional liquidity. Bartolomucci also made historical arguments about why credit unions should be eligible.

CUNA supported the Credit Union Share Insurance Fund Parity Act (H.R. 3468; 113th Congress), a bill that would expand federal deposit insurance to include Interest on Lawyer Trust Accounts (IOLTAs) and similar escrow accounts housed within credit unions. The CUNA said that "this legislation is necessary because the National Credit Union Administration (NCUA) has interpreted that the Federal Credit Union Act does not permit it to extend such coverage." CUNA President Bill Cheney said that the bill "would reduce credit unions regulatory burden and help them better serve their members."

== See also ==
- National Association of Federal Credit Unions
- National Credit Union Administration
- National Association of State Credit Union Supervisors
- National Credit Union Foundation
