= Guna =

Guna may refer to:

== People ==
- Guna people, Indigenous peoples of Panama and Colombia
  - Guna language, their language
- Guna, Latvian female given name

== Philosophy ==
- Guṇa, a Hindu philosophical concept
- Guṇa (Jainism), a philosophical concept

== Places ==
- Guna district, in Madhya Pradesh, India
  - Guna, India, the capital city of the Guna District
  - Guna Junction railway station
  - Guna (Lok Sabha constituency)
  - Guna (Vidhan Sabha constituency)
- Mount Guna, a shield volcano in Ethiopia
- Guna (woreda), a district of Ethiopia

== Other uses ==
- Guna (film) or Gunaa, a 1991 Indian Tamil-language psychological romance
- Guna Airlines, a former airline based in Nepal
- Guna (knife), a Visayan agricultural knife

== See also ==
- Guna Yala, an Indigenous territory in northeast Panama
