= TruStage Financial Group =

American mutual insurance company

- Formerly: CUNA Mutual Group
- Type: Mutual
- Industry: Insurance and finance
- Founded: 1935; 91 years ago (as Credit Union National Association)
- Headquarters: Madison, Wisconsin, U.S.
- Area served: Worldwide
- Key people: Terrance Williams, President and CEO
- Services: financial services commercial & consumer services investment products personal services lending services wealth management and retirement services
- Revenue: ▲6.065 billion USD (2025)
- Net income: ▲312 million USD (2025)
- Total assets: ▲49.708 billion USD (2025)
- Website: www.trustage.com

TruStage Financial Group, Inc., formerly known as CUNA Mutual Group (pronounced /ˈkjuːnə/), is an American mutual insurance company headquartered in Madison, Wisconsin. It provides financial services to cooperatives, credit unions, and their members. TruStage Financial Group sells commercial and consumer insurance and protection products as well as retirement plan services to small businesses and credit union employees. It also provides auto, home, life and loan protection products to credit union members. The company was founded in 1935 as the CUNA Mutual Insurance Society.

== History ==
TruStage Financial Group was founded in 1935 as the CUNA Mutual Insurance Society. Its purpose was to offer financial protection to Americans during the credit union movement. The "CUNA" in the company's name originally stood for "Credit Union National Association". It is headquartered in Madison, Wisconsin.

After World War II, CUNA grew rapidly and expanded many of its services. It began selling insurance products in 1983. The company first registered the TruStage brand trademark in 2010, and it was first used commercially in 2013.

TruStage is the brand name of a group of insurance products provided by TruStage Financial Group. TruStage is the insurance arm of TruStage Financial Group, which is rated "A" (Excellent; 3rd highest out of 16 possible ratings) by credit rating agency A.M. Best as of February 2017. The TruStage brand first sold insurance products commercially in 2013. It exceeded $1 billion in consumer coverage in 2017, and exceeded $6 billion in 2018. TruStage Financial Group is the marketing name for CMFG Life Insurance Company, its subsidiaries, and affiliates.

On July 11, 2026, TruStage detected a cybersecurity incident in their systems. The incident response caused suspension of almost all financial services offered by TruStage starting July 14, 2026. Numerous class action lawsuits were filed as a result. The company described the incident as a "particularly broad attack on our network and system". As of the beginning of October 2026, services remained incompletely operational and the company has stated they are rebuilding parts of their infrastructure. The full scope and impact of the security breach has not been communicated publicly.

== Labor negotiations ==
Since February 2022, TruStage Financial Group and 450 employee members of OPEIU #39 have been negotiating a successor labor agreement to replace the previous agreement that expired March 31, 2022. Talks broke down in January 2023, with the union alleging the company was no longer engaging in good faith bargaining over union member priorities including fair compensation, pay equity, job security assurances against outsourcing, remote work protections, retirement security, and affordable health care.

In February and March 2023, the union filed unfair labor practice (ULP) charges with the National Labor Relations Board (NLRB) against the company asserting refusal to bargain, bad faith bargaining, refusal to furnish information, subcontracting unit work, retaliation against workers for union activity, all of which are prohibited by federal law. All of the ULPs filed during that time were later determined to be without merit and either dismissed or withdrawn, according to NLRB case data. On April 19, 2023, 87% of union members voted on whether to allow the union's bargaining committee to authorize a strike within 30 days if no labor agreement is reached. The measure was approved with 92% member support. Workers ratified a new contract in December 2023 that runs through March 2028 and includes pay raises of 15.5% retroactive to 2022 and a 13.25% pay raise over the four-year contract period.
