= Interest on Lawyers' Trust Accounts =

Method of raising money

Interest on Lawyers' Trust Accounts (IOLTA) is a method of raising money for charitable purposes, primarily the provision of civil legal services to indigent persons, through the use of interest earned on certain lawyer trust accounts. The establishment of IOLTA in the United States followed changes to federal banking laws passed by Congress in 1980 which allowed some checking accounts to bear interest. The Florida Bar Foundation launched the first American IOLTA program in 1981. Today, every state, the District of Columbia and the U.S. Virgin Islands operate IOLTA programs.

== How it works ==
Attorneys routinely receive client funds (commonly referred to as "trust money") to be held in trust for future use. If the amount is large or the funds are to be held for a long period of time, the attorney customarily places these funds in an interest-bearing account for the benefit of the client. However, in the case of amounts that are small or are to be held for a short time, it is impractical for the attorney to establish a separate account for each client since the cost of establishing and administering the account would exceed any interest generated, and result in a net loss for the client. Prior to IOLTA, these nominal and short-term funds were combined and placed into a pooled, non-interest-bearing checking account. The reason the accounts were non-interest-bearing is that prior to 1981, commercial banks were prohibited by federal law from paying interest on demand deposits (e.g. checking accounts). In addition, the lawyer could not earn interest on the account because it is unethical for attorneys to derive any financial benefit from funds that belong to their clients.

With the inception of IOLTA, lawyers who handle nominal or short-term client funds that cannot earn net interest for the client place these funds in pooled, interest-bearing accounts, and the interest earned on these accounts is remitted to the state IOLTA program for charitable purposes. Nearly all IOLTA programs in the United States use IOLTA revenue to provide grants to organizations for the purpose of providing legal aid in civil matters to low-income residents; many also use IOLTA revenue for grants to help improve the administration of justice in their states.

Proper management of a lawyer's IOLTA (also commonly referred to as a "trust account") is highly regulated by each respective state bar. Proper management of a lawyer's IOLTA or client trust account is a key law office management skill, typically following the principles of double-entry bookkeeping with additional safeguards to preserve a clear audit trail. These safeguards are intended to ensure that client funds can be accurately accounted for even if the lawyer is unable or unwilling to cooperate with bar authorities or an inventory attorney. Law firm owners are responsible for obtaining adequate training in the management of client trust accounts. Effective management of client property trust account is required for compliance with bar rules and the efficient and profitable operation of the law firm. States typically require MCLE (Minimum Continuing Legal Education) providers to be accredited by the state's court system.

== History ==
IOLTA programs were first established in Australia and Canada in the late 1960s to generate funds for legal services to the poor and other charitable purposes. In the U.S., IOLTA programs are state-specific, and operate under their own rules and regulations. Most of the U.S. IOLTA programs have been created by Court Rule, while several have been established through state legislatures. In many states the IOLTA program is administered by the charitable arm of the state bar association, whereas some states have created other entities to operate the IOLTA program. IOLTA revenue has become a major source of funding for civil legal services in the United States. It is also, however, an unpredictable revenue stream because IOLTA income is entirely dependent on the current interest rate environment and economic conditions.

== Legality ==
Explicitly, IOLTA applies only to funds that are "nominal in amount or held for a short period of time". So larger amounts of money held for single clients are exempt from the IOLTA program. That means, typically, that client funds eligible for IOLTA involve small amounts of money held for a long time, or significant amounts of money held for a short time. As was the case prior to IOLTA, lawyers must exercise their discretion in determining whether a given client's trust deposit is of sufficient size or will be held for sufficient duration to justify the cost of being individually invested for a client.

Since IOLTA's inception, a number of court cases have arisen in which parties argued that IOLTA programs violated the Fifth Amendment by resulting in an unconstitutional taking. This argument was put to rest by the Supreme Court of the United States when it upheld the constitutionality of IOLTA in Brown v. Legal Foundation of Washington, reasoning that there is no "taking" of client money, because the money being held on behalf of the individual client would not have generated any net interest for the client.

== Canadian practices ==
Over a 15-year period, starting in 1971, law foundations were founded in every Canadian province. For the most part they were all founded with a mandate to support the following five areas:

- Legal aid
- Legal education
- Legal research
- Law reform
- Law libraries

In some instances the provincial legislation and/or regulations which direct the foundations also prescribe specific funding formulas which are applied to the five mandates.

In all provinces IOLTA generated from pooled trust accounts is remitted to the applicable law foundation of the province.
