= History of cooperatives in Canada =

Cooperative movement in Canada
- 1840s–recent
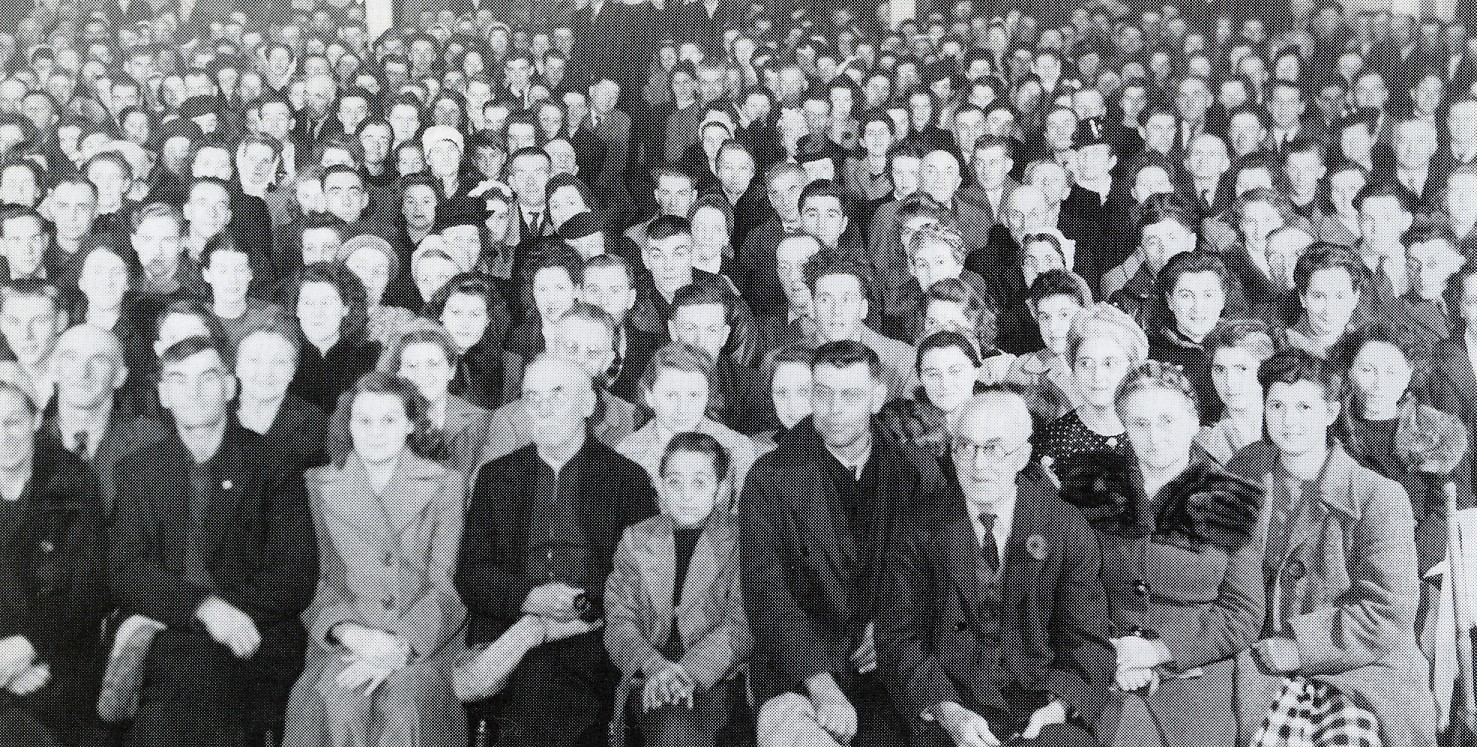
- The conference of the cooperative movement in Chéticamp, Nova Scotia in 1947

The cooperative movement in Canada is a social and economic movement that started in the middle of the 19th century and continues until today.

During the Great Migration of Canada many British people as well as citizens from other European countries immigrated to Canada with new ideas of cooperative enterprises. Starting with unsuccessful attempts but inspired by examples from British cooperative movement as well as fast development of Canada as a state, cooperative movement became one of the important events in Canadian economic history.

== Reasons ==
Industrialization led to the emergence of large centralized factory systems in urban centres. These systems disrupted the existing crafts system and many Canadian craftsmen lost their power in the market very quickly. As a consequence many craftsmen became poor or lost their jobs. This made craftsmen to start to unite in small cooperative enterprises to provide themselves power to control their business and products they couldn't afford otherwise. That's how cooperative movement began:

The crafts system, that was basically located in local homes and villages, was completely undermined and disrupted. The concentration of workers in large centralized factory systems in the urban centres entailed a massive migration of people from the countryside to over-crowded cities... The kind of power that a craftsman might have over his work and how it was sold and the price he got for it was, overnight, undermined by a weight system that really impoverished a huge number of people. It also created an enormous amount of unemployment... So if you put these factors together you had a response and a reaction to that, and part of that was the co-operative movement.

— John Restakis, Executive Director of the British Columbia Co-operatives Association

== History ==
=== Early attempts ===
The British government united Lower and Upper Canada into the united Province of Canada by the Act of Union in 1840, sparking the beginnings of democracy in Canada. Following this,

British ideas of cooperatives emerged and the first attempts of establishing new marketing cooperatives occurred around the 1840s. However, most of them were unstable and failed. The first recorded consumer cooperative was organized at Stellarton, Nova Scotia, in 1864. In the same year there are records that the first cooperative bank was organized in Prince Edward Island in North Rustico. During the 1880s with the support of Knights of Labor trade union, some worker cooperatives emerged.

These early attempts took place before there were any specific cooperative legislation or accepted international principles. This allowed cooperative members to create their own agile company law to follow, which was very important in the early stages of development.

=== Rural cooperatives ===
Agricultural movements were the first successful cooperative movements in Canada. The dairy industry had a lot of opportunities because many farmers had excessive production of milk. Between 1860 and 1900 not without help of Canadian Pacific Railway there were developed over 1200 cooperative creameries and cheese factories in Ontario, Québec and Atlantic Canada. With reefer ships becoming more common cheese became a major export to Great Britain.

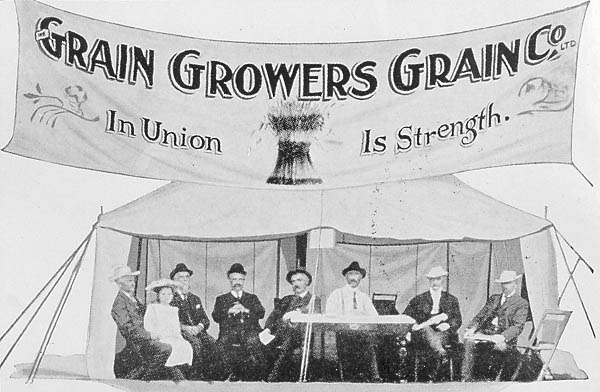
Grain Growers Grain Co circa 1910

In Prairie Canada farmers led by Edward Alexander Partridge organized the Grain Growers' Grain Company in 1906. Their aim was to market directly to millers and European buyers. Patridge had strong beliefs in cooperation as a weapon against "the financial buccaneers" that could bring "an industrial millenium." Before World War I many other farmer cooperatives appeared in different branches of the agricultural industry, such as fruit, livestock, and tobacco. In particular, the Saskatchewan Co-operative Elevator Co. appeared in 1911 and the Alberta Farmers' Co-operative Elevator Co.

Rural cooperatives had a huge influence in political area. Among the main movements were the Patrons of Husbandry (1870s), the Patrons of Industry (1890s), Progressive movement (1914-1930), the western branches of the Co-operative Commonwealth Federation and Social Credit Party of Canada (both in the 1930s)

During World War I rural cooperatives expanded rapidly due to consumer demand for cheaper food. Moreover, farmers explored new ways of marketing and cooperative ways of saving and borrowing money. Cooperatives who experienced bigger growth included the new multipurpose Co-operative Fédérée (established 1910 in Quebec), and United Farmers' Co-operative (established 1914 in Ontario).

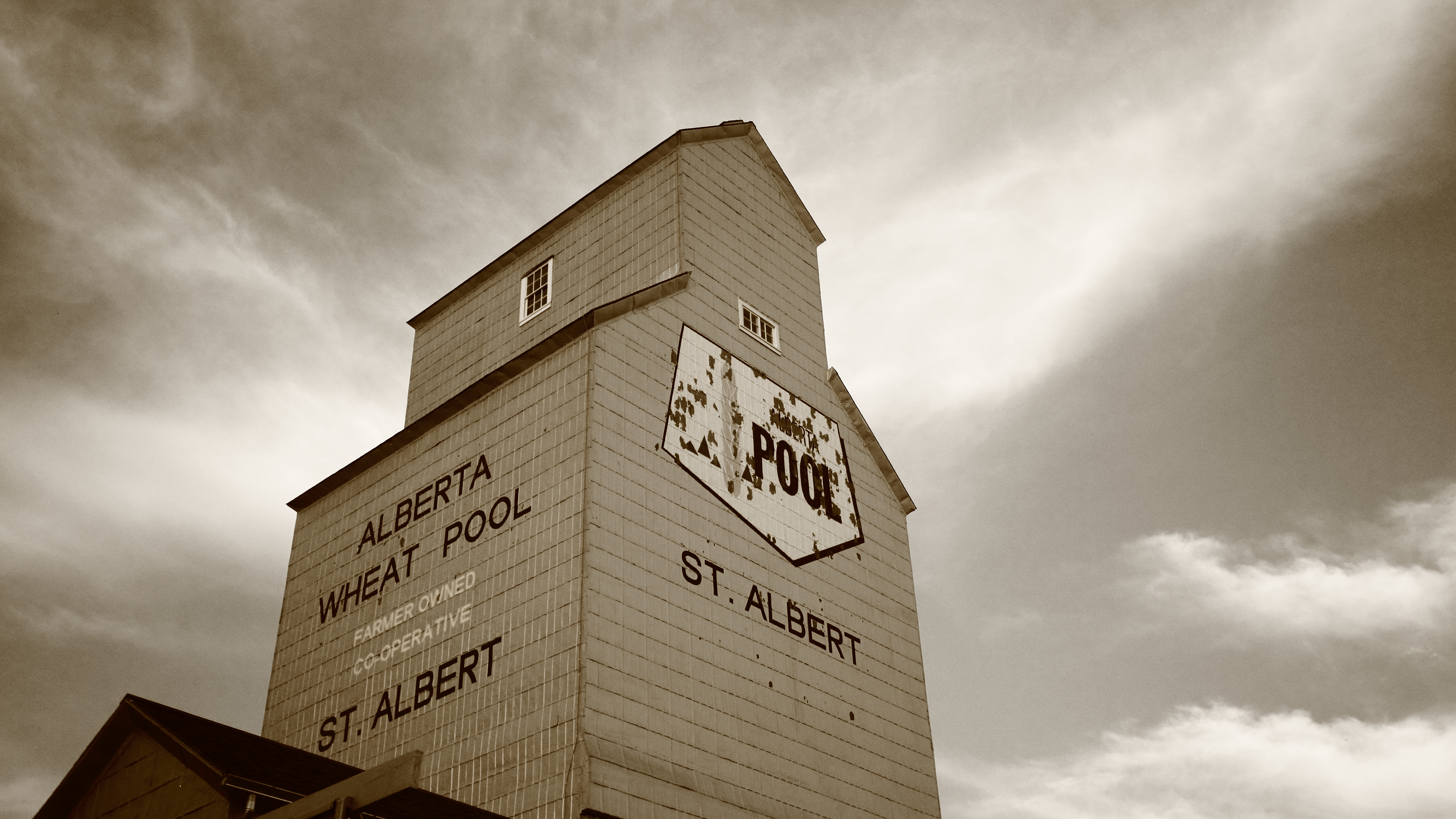
Alberta Grain Company grain elevator

By 1919 as farmers wanted to control the marketing of their products more, they were drawn in a system so-called "cooperative pooling". The principle of the system was to sign contracts with cooperative members to sell all their products through their cooperative. In return members would receive dividends. According to these principles farmers of Prairies organized wheat pools in the 1920s. Similarly, in the Okanagan, the grower-owned BC Tree Fruits Cooperative was established in 1936 to sell, store, and package fruit.

=== Consumer cooperatives ===
Early consumer cooperatives were created by immigrants from Europe who brought new economic ideas with them. They were British, Finnish, Italian, and Ukrainian workers, most commonly in the mining towns of Cape Breton, Northern Ontario, the Rocky Mountains and Vancouver Island. The British consumer theory of cooperation dominated.

The consumer movement was supported by the Cooperative Union of Canada that was organized in 1909 and particularly by its General Secretary, George Keen.

In mining communities one of the most successful stores was the British Canadian Co-operative Society in Sydney Mines. Started by recent arrivals from Britain, it strictly followed the Rochdale system. In 1908 it created an educational fund. Within 30 years the society was prospering; in 1938 it had nearly 3500 members and gross annual sales of 3 million dollars. From 1917 it was one of the largest consumer co-operatives in North America.

There was an adoption of Brotherhood economics, created by Toyohiko Kagawa, within cooperatives in Atlantic Canada from 1910 to 1940. Initiatives were undertaken to establish Women's Co-operative Guilds, recognizing the potential of women to bolster the cooperative movement. While efforts were made to enhance women's participation, including programs like the "Women's Work" Program and "The Woman with the Basket" initiative, aimed at increasing their involvement, women encountered obstacles in attaining formal decision-making roles and equitable authority within cooperatives. Despite some advancements, such as the appointment of female delegates to the Congress of Nova Scotia Co-operative Societies in 1944, women's integration into decision-making processes within cooperative organizations remained challenging overall.

=== Financial cooperatives ===
In 1900 Alphonse Desjardins founded a banking cooperative or his first caisse populaire in Quebec that now is known as Desjardins Group. Using connections within the Roman Catholic Church and with key political figures Alphonse created a foundation for this movement before his death in 1920.

Desjardins was an official reporter of debates in the House of Commons. Pursuing ethical goals of movement, he included, as a condition of membership in his societies, the rules that obligate each member to be "punctual in his payments", "sober", "of good habits", "industrious", and "scrupulously honest". He cooperated with another leader of movement, Frederick Debartzch Monk, a Conservative Member of Parliament from Montreal to introduce seven bills for co-operative legislation between 1906 and 1911. The second bill from these led to the creation of a Parliamentary committee on co-operation. The third bill with the help of newly established committee passed the House of Commons but was defeated on the third reading in the Senate by a margin of one vote. These proceedings encouraged even more interest in co-operation in Canada.

During the 1930s financial cooperatives in particular the credit unions gained huge support from the Antigonish movement through Jimmy Tompkins. In 1931 he made Roy Bergengren of the Credit Union National Association to present the value of co-operative credit societies. Within one year a credit union act had been passed. From 1933 with the first appearance of credit unions in Nova Scotia the wave of cooperative banking spread over Maritimes. By 1939 there were 148 credit unions in Nova Scotia, 68 in New Brunswick, and 37 in Prince Edward Island. The Nova Scotian League with many other credit union leagues emerged in the late 1930s. It later joined the Credit Union National Association in the United States, and as a response to that, the nationalist group from Acadians soon developed their own credit union central and insurance company.

The movement got even more power with the appearance of insurance and trust companies in the 1940s and 1950s in Quebec, Ontario and Saskatchewan.

=== Cooperative housing ===
Ideas of cooperative housing were emerging in the minds of movement leaders before World War I. Governed by high principles and inspired by a 1910 speaking tour of Henry Vivian, a cooperative leader from Britain invited by Earl Grey, George Keen and Samuel Carter advocated cooperative housing as a way to future cities:

The ideal Canadian city is a well thought-out and systematically developed scheme of co-partnership houses, occupied by workers engaged in labor co-partnership factories, buying their merchandise from their own Cooperative store. Then the age of the exploiter will disappear and the reign of a happy, contented and cultured people will begin.

— George Keen

Despite such enlightenment cooperative housing couldn't start until the 1930s when mining families in Nova Scotia had serious housing problems. The Antigonish movement in attempt to develop housing coops invited Mary Arnold, one of the most important housing leaders in New York, to come to Cape Breton and promote their ideas. As a result, cooperatives of families united to build houses for themselves and over 30,000 houses would be built in Atlantic Canada.

At the same time more conventional housing cooperatives appeared among students at the University of Toronto. Students at Queen's University, Waterloo University and Ottawa University also joined the movement. Today, it is rather small but successful.

After World War II some citizens of the biggest cities in Canada started to independently organize housing cooperatives and sometimes also living communities. This way cooperatives continued to develop during 1960 and 1970s.

=== Worker cooperatives ===
After unsuccessful attempts of the Knights of Labour to develop worker coops in the 1880s, there were several local provincial efforts in the twentieth century. Samuel Carter who became a first president of the Co-operative Union of Canada together with George Keen were impressed by labour co-operatives and tried to create one in Guelph in 1910, where he owned a knitting mill and further was a major in 1913–1914. In spite of his huge power in the city his attempt failed.

George Keen strongly propagated worker cooperatives throughout Southern Ontario, with the following message:

Labour co-partnership is the one remedy for industrial war. It is the only principle which on an equitable basis harmonizes completely and effectually the conflicting interests of labour and capital. It is the one method of production which makes strikes virtually impossible, for no man is anxious to strike against himself and jeopardize the integrity of his own capital in the process.

— George Keen

Only during economic expansion after World War II did ideas of worker cooperatives start to be taken seriously. The largest ones appeared in Quebec forestry industries and they remain this way until today.

In the 1960s and 1970s worker cooperatives began to appear in Montreal, Toronto, Vancouver and Victoria. They helped to develop similar coops in many areas of industry including energy, bakeries, tourism, crafts, restaurants and some social services.

=== Fishing cooperatives ===
East Coast fishing cooperatives were started in the 1920s. These cooperatives found themselves in a difficult marketing situation and were not stable in maintaining an effective united front to their industry competitors. Hardly organized and despite support from Antigonish movement, in the 1970s and 1980s the cooperatives were not able to show the federal government the need to protect the fisheries they were worked in. This led to a rapid decline in fishing stocks and the destruction of these fisheries in the 1980s.

West Coast fishing cooperatives began at about the same time. In contrast, with the help of fishing unions, they had a strong associational spirit.

Father Jimmy Tompkins and Father Moses Coady, leaders of the Antigonish movement, put a huge effort to help fishing communities in the Maritimes, in particular, in Nova Scotia and New Brunswick. Between 1918 and 1933 the marketed value of fish products sold by these communities fell by 50%. By lobbying Tompkins and Coady got attention of government on the situation and soon Coady was employed by the Department of Fisheries as an organizer of fishing co-ops. Having great success due to his prior investigation of international experience and good organizational skill, Coady influenced the establishment of the United Maritimes Fisheries.

Another large fishing cooperative located in Prince Rupert on the northern coast of British Columbia was the Prince Rupert Fishermen's Co-operative Association. Its leaders became important figures in the Canadian movement generally and its general manager, Ken Harding, became an international leader in the cooperative fishing world.

=== Health cooperatives ===
The need for proper health services was common in Canada, especially in lands with low population density. This caused some rural cooperatives to make arrangements with doctors for their members as early as the 1920s. In the 1960s, inspired by the Beveridge report that British government started to implement after World War II, the Canadian government introduced universal health care in Saskatchewan. This led to strikes of the province's doctors, and cooperatives health clinics started to appear in Saskatoon.

Further development of cooperatives began also outside of Saskatchewan, but it was hard to organise cooperative health clinics with a health system financed by the government. In recent years, interest in health cooperatives has increased with rising of health care costs. Now, around 60% of all health coops in Canada are situated in Quebec.

== Women in cooperatives ==
In 1938, Berthe Chaurès-Louard became the first president of a food cooperative in Québec, La Familiale.

== Examples of modern cooperatives in Canada ==
The three major Canadian cooperative organizations are:

- CCA - Canadian Co-operative Association
- DID - Développement international Desjardins
- SOCODEVI - société de coopération pour le développement international

There are also some notable aboriginal cooperatives:

- Akochikan Co-operative: Pukatawagan, Manitoba
- Ikaluktutiak Co-operative: Cambridge Bay, Nunavut
- Neechi Foods Co-operative Limited: Winnipeg, Manitoba

Black and racialized Canadians also have their own form of cooperatives called rotating savings and credit associations (ROSCAs) and also known as the Banker Ladies.
