= Margaree Valley =

Community in Nova Scotia, Canada

Coordinates: 46°21′21″N 60°58′19″W

Margaree Valley in Nova Scotia

Margaree Valley (formerly known as Frizzleton) is a small community in the Canadian province of Nova Scotia, located in Inverness County on Cape Breton Island.

The Margaree valley is about 15 miles long, situated between the Appalachian Mountains, making up the Margaree River Watershed.

The economy of the community is primarily tourism, bringing fly-fishers to the Margaree River to fish for the Atlantic Salmon and Brook Trout. Agriculture, forestry, and construction are also major trades in the community. Among the early settlers of Margaree Valley were James Frizzle, after whom Frizzleton was named, who was a local store-keeper and postmaster. Also, Jacob Ingraham, John Crowdis, John MacCharles, Robert Burton, James G. MacDonald, and Fraser Carmichael. In 1884, Frizzleton District had their first school building, which stood on Egypt Road. The second school was built in 1922 and was known as 'Frizzleton 21' until it was purchased in 1959 by the Margaree Baptist Church to be used as a Church hall. In 1957, the schools were consolidated and students attended the North East Margaree Consolidated School in Margaree Centre (now the home to the Cranton Crossroads Community Centre and the North East Margaree Volunteer Fire Dept.).

The Margaree Baptist Church was officially founded in 1835 by many of the early settlers of Margaree Valley and Margaree Centre. The founding members were John Burton, Rev. William Burton, Murdoch Ross, Caroline Ingraham, John L. and Mary Ingraham, Donald MacPherson. John Ingraham was deacon and Murdoch Ross was clerk. Rev. William Burton was minister. The first Margaree Baptist Church building was constructed in 1837 at Margaree Centre. In the 1860s, that building was abandoned and a new building was constructed at Frizzleton. In 1870-71, the first Baptist parsonage was constructed - 'The Mission House'. It served until 1922, when a new one was built. In 1902-03, the present Church building was built beside the second. In 1922, the Margaree Fish Hatchery began operation on the Margaree River in Portree. Today, the hatchery is home to around 200,000 Atlantic Salmon and 100,000 Brook Trout. The hatchery is one of only three provincially-owned fish hatcheries in Nova Scotia.

The name, Margaree Valley, was adapted officially on 10 April 1961.

The population of Margaree Valley in 1966 was 310.

The population of Margaree Valley in 2016 was 355

== Churches Nearby ==
- Margaree Baptist Church - founded 1835; became Margaree Valley Baptist Church.
- Margaree Congregational Church - founded 1822; begun by the Hart family; joined United Church of Canada in 1925 and became Wilson United Church.
- St. Patrick's Catholic Church - founded 1871.
- Margaree Methodist Circuit - a minister came for a third of a year with the Margaree Methodist congregation. Eventually, the Margaree Methodist Church was founded in the early 1900s, but the assembly joined the United Church of Canada in 1925 and the building was moved to Middle River.
- Margaree Presbyterian Church - founded in 1865; from 1871-1880, Rev. Alexander Grant of Lake Ainslie included this small congregation of Margaree Harbour in his pastoral charge. In 1925, they decided to join the United Church of Canada. The name was changed to Calvin United Church. Another Presbyterian congregation met in Big Intervale as early as 1868, at the headwaters of the Margaree River. This church joined UCC in 1925 and became the Big Intervale United Church.

== Parks Nearby ==
- Margaree River Watershed
- Cape Breton Highlands National Park
- Lake O'Law Provincial Park
- Southwest Margaree Provincial Park

== Notable people ==
- James and 'Granny' Ross - Harriette 'Granny' Ross is known to be the first white woman to settle in the Northeast Margaree.
- Rev. P. R. Foster (1836-1911) - Rev. Paoli R. Foster was from Aylesford, Nova Scotia. He came to Margaree Valley and preached what became known as the '1879 Foster Revival' at the Margaree Baptist Church.
- George Wilson MacPherson - George grew up in the Margaree Valley, where the Normaway Inn is located now. He was converted during the 1879 Foster Revival in the Margaree Baptist Church. He eventually became a "Tent Evangel" with Harry Ironside in New York City.
- Rev. J.J. Tompkins (1870-1953) - J.J. was a Roman Catholic priest from Margaree Valley. He also became known as a founding figure for the Antigonish Movement (adult education), establishing the "People's School" at St. Francis-Xavier University.
- Rt. Rev. Moses Coady (1882-1959) - Moses was a Catholic priest from Northeast Margaree. He was also instrumental in the Antigonish Movement with J.J. Tompkins.
- Ernest Hart (1885-1970) - Ernest was a well-known local carpenter and blacksmith for the Margaree Valley. His story is told in The Chairmaker and the Boys and The Contended Chairmaker of Cape Breton by the National Film Board of Canada.
