= Mary Ellicott Arnold =

American social activist, teacher, and writer

- Born: April 23, 1876; New Brighton, New York City
- Died: 1968 (aged 91–92); Nova Scotia
- Education: Drexel Institute; Cornell University
- Partner: Mabel Reed

Mary Ellicott Arnold (April 23, 1876 – 1968) was an American social activist, teacher and writer best known for In the Land of the Grasshopper Song, the memoir she wrote with Mabel Reed (February 6, 1876 – December, 1962) on their experiences as Bureau of Indian Affairs employees, 1908–1909.

A native of Staten Island, New York, Arnold moved at an early age to Somerville, New Jersey where she began her childhood friendship with Mabel Reed, a companionship that later matured into a life partnership. Arnold studied business at Drexel Institute, Philadelphia, and agriculture at Cornell University in Ithaca, New York. As young women, Arnold and Reed devoted five years (1901–1906) to farming a 55-acre plot. They next gained experience as urban organizers in New York City. Their employer, City and Suburban Homes Company, was a philanthropic organization building affordable, decent housing for the working poor.

When Arnold and Reed accepted positions as so-called field matrons on the Hoopa Valley Indian Reservation in the Klamath River Valley of Northern California, they were charged to exert a "civilizing influence" upon the fewer than eight hundred members of the Karok nation, a vagueness they were to exploit to their own benefit and that of the Karok.

Arnold and Reed lacked the social and racial prejudices of the era. Although the Bureau of Indian Affairs expected them to enforce white cultural values, they instead accepted Karok practices and established a close working friendship with Essie, a native woman with three husbands. They were eager, Arnold said, not to be "ladies—the kind who have Sunday schools, and never say a bad word, and rustle around in a lot of silk petticoats".

In the decades following their breakthrough experience of independent living and community education among the Karok, Arnold and Reed further developed their skills as organizers and activists in cooperative housing, credit unions, adult education, rural development, and American Indian rights. Arnold worked in Nova Scotia, Newfoundland, Maine, New York, and Pennsylvania.

In Reserve Mines, Nova Scotia, Arnold and Reed helped the mining community establish cooperative housing. Arnold conferred with Antigonish Movement elders Moses Coady and Father Jimmy and she and Reed lived among the miners.

In 2016, Nova Scotia playwright Lindsay Kyte illustrated this as a musical true story, Tompkinsville about a community built by the residents themselves, assisted by Arnold and Reed, and the town priest, Jimmy Tompkins and Rev. Dr. Moses Coady (for whom the Coady International Institute is named, in Antigonish, Nova Scotia.) Kyte's great-uncle and aunt were among the residents, struggling for freedom from the Dominion Coal Company in Reserve Mines.

Arnold was an active Quaker and a finance officer with the Women's International League for Peace and Freedom. She was a member of the Providence Monthly Meeting in Media, Pennsylvania. Mary Ellicott Arnold and Mabel Reed are buried together at Providence Friends Meeting Cemetery, Media, Pennsylvania.

Arnold's papers and correspondence are housed at Friends Historical Library, Swarthmore College and the Schlesinger Library, Radcliffe Institute for Advanced Study.

In 2003, playwright Lauren Wilson adapted In the Land of the Grasshopper Song for the stage as a musical comedy, with music by Tim Gray, for production by the Dell'Arte theater troupe.
