= Reserve Mines =

Community in Nova Scotia, Canada

Coordinates: 46°10′48.9″N 60°1′10.3″W

Reserve Mines in Nova Scotia

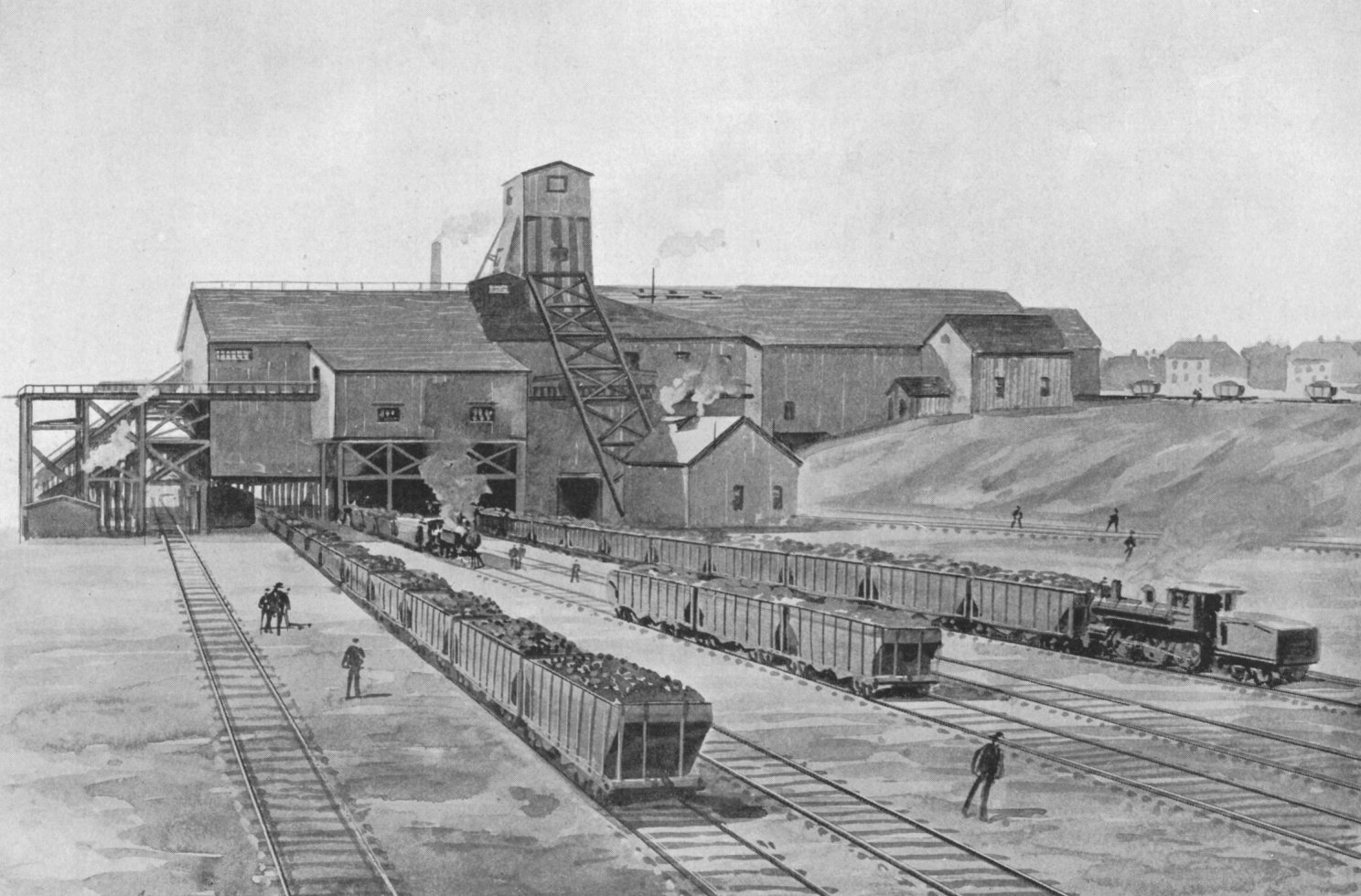
Former coal mine at Reserve Mines, ca 1900. the mine closed in the mid-1950s.

Reserve Mines (2009 pop.: 2,402) is a community in the Canadian province of Nova Scotia, located in Cape Breton Regional Municipality.

It is located immediately west of Glace Bay and 10 kilometres northeast of Sydney. The J.A. Douglas McCurdy Sydney Airport is located in the western part of the community.

The Antigonish Movement aided Reserve Mines in the mid-1930s when Father Jimmy Tompkins, Moses Coady and Mary E. Arnold helped the small town with education, housing and the first credit union. Reserve Mines is known for coal mining from 1860 to mid-1950 and the mines were called Dominion 5 and Dominion 10 Colliery. Later they were used for an airshaft and escape passage from Number 26 Colliery in Glace Bay.

Reserve Mines is also known as the home of harness racing grand circuit winner Lambert Todd with a lifetime mark of 2.02.1 in the early 1920s.

== See also ==
- Gordon United Church, Reserve Mines
