= Building cooperative =

Co-operative housing corporation

A building co-operative is a co-operative housing corporation where individuals or families work together to directly construct their own homes in a cooperative fashion.

Members of this type of co-operative purchase building materials in bulk and co-operate with other members of the co-op during the construction phase of the co-operative. When the housing has been completed, the members usually own their homes directly. In some cases, roads, parkland and community facilities continue to be owned by the co-operative.

== History ==
Building co-ops was extremely popular in many parts of Canada from the 1930s to the 1960s. Father James (Jimmy) Tompkins and Dr. Moses Coady were key organizers in Nova Scotia of the first building co-operatives. Through active local study groups, they began research on co-operatives and developed a concept of how a building co-op could work.

In 1936, Father Tompkins helped found the first self-help building co-operative in North America near Glace Bay (Reserve Mines), Nova Scotia, Canada. A group of coal miners formed a housing cooperative with a loan of CAN $22,000. The housing loan was used to pay for building materials. Each miner's personal contribution consisted of his labor or "sweat equity". The miners worked together to build eleven homes, which they moved into in 1938. These homes continue to be occupied today at Tompkinsville.
