= Jake Siemens =

Canadian activist

Jake Siemens

Jacob (Jake) John Siemens (May 23, 1896 – July 12, 1963) was a Canadian farmer, co-operative leader, social entrepreneur, and adult educator.

Born and raised a Mennonite near Altona, Manitoba, Siemens taught for 10 years before taking over the family farm in 1929. With the onset of the Great Depression, he played a key role in the emergence of the dynamic co-operative movement in southern Manitoba. Since he understood his work as an expression of Christian love, it ignited controversy within the Mennonite community. In his later years he left the Mennonite community and moved to Winnipeg, where he ran for office as a candidate for the New Democratic Party. On his death in 1963 he was buried at a Unitarian church.

== Community self-help ==
By 1931, the farming communities around Altona and Winkler, Manitoba, were in crisis. As a result of the extreme financial pressures of the times, only 159 of the 1,240 farmers in Rhineland district retained clear title to their land. That year Siemens helped organize, then served as vice-president of, the Rhineland Agricultural Society. The Society persuaded farmers to accept government extension services, organized agricultural fairs, and taught better practices through a quarterly journal.

The farmers faced an even more immediate need to reduce their costs for basic supplies like gas, oil, grease and binder twine. At Siemens suggestion they organized the Rhineland Consumers' Co-operative in the same year, electing him president. The directors had to put their farms up as collateral for the $2,500 bank loan. But the co-operative succeeded, paying its first dividend in 1935. By 1939 it had 573 members.

The efforts of Siemens and his fellow co-operators were not appreciated by everyone. A Mennonite commentator observes that "[t]he Bergthal Mennonite leadership rejected his vision as too socialistic and insufficiently orthodox. The resulting pro- and anti-cooperative division in much of the area between Altona and Winkler influenced both church and community very negatively." Peter D. Reimer, an ardent co-operator who published the Rhineland Agricultural Society's quarterly journal, was forced out of his position as a local school teacher in 1934. Two years later Reimer died, at 51, due to a recurrence of tuberculosis.

== Study clubs and a co-operative college ==
Siemens continued catalyzing community action by helping groups to form study clubs similar to those that were organized by the Antigonish Movement and Moses Coady. And he was active in starting up the Winkler Co-op Creamery and the Altona Co-op Vegetable Oils (1944). Beginning in 1941, Siemens also served as the first president of the Federation of Southern Manitoba Co-operatives.

In 1948 Siemens travelled to Denmark, where he visited the folk high schools. On his return he worked for the formation of a co-operative education centre in the Prairies, that would be capable of teaching the philosophical and technical aspects of co-operation, carrying out research, and granting degrees. This vision rallied many of the co-operative leader of the time, including Alexander Laidlaw, Barney Arnasson and Harry Fowler. When fellow co-operators agreed to the idea, Siemens offered 80 acres (320,000 m^{2}) of his own land for the site.

The Western Co-operative College, which opened in Saskatoon in 1955, realized Siemens' educational vision. By the 1960s it was bringing together co-operators not only from the Prairies but from native communities in Arctic, and developing countries around the world.

== Legacy ==
There has never been a formal assessment of the impact of the southern Manitoba co-operative movement or of Siemens' work. However, healthy and economically dynamic rural communities are the main goal of rural co-operative action, and "one might observe that the Altona area remains relatively diversified (famous across the Prairies for sunflower seeds, sausages and printing, among other things), prosperous and populated."

Like many social entrepreneurs in Canada's early co-operative movement, Siemens strove to balance business with education. This remains a compelling challenge today.
