= St. Paul's Presbyterian Church, Glace Bay =

Presbyterian church in Glace Bay, Nova Scotia, Canada

St. Paul's Presbyterian Church
- St. Paul's Presbyterian Church
- 46°11′00″N 59°57′46″W
- Location: Glace Bay, Nova Scotia
- Country: Canada
- Denomination: Presbyterian

History
- Status: Church
- Founded: December 1866; 159 years ago

Architecture
- Functional status: Active
- Architect(s): Gavel and Associate
- Groundbreaking: 1993

St. Paul's Presbyterian Church is a Presbyterian congregation located in the community of Glace Bay, Nova Scotia, Canada.

== Early history ==
Between 1850 and 1866, Presbyterian services were held in Little Glace Bay by Rev. Dr. Hugh MacLeod, Minister of Union Presbyterian Church, Mira Ferry; MacLeod had come to Cape Breton in 1849 from the Free Church of Scotland. In March 1867, the Rev. Alexander Farquharson Jr., son of a pioneer Minister at Grand River was inducted as the first minister of the newly formed (December 1866) congregation in Glace Bay. The following year, a church building was constructed by the congregation on the corner of Commercial and York streets. Farquharson left in 1876 to replace MacLeod in nearby Sydney. In 1881 the Rev. James Forbes was inducted as minister of St. Paul's and as the communities around Glace Bay grew, he founded the congregations of Chalmers in Dominion, and Gordon in Reserve Mines. In 1892 these congregations separated from St. Paul's and became a self-sustaining pastoral charge, until they too, were self-supporting a few years later.

== Growth and expansion ==
In 1895, a larger church was constructed by the firm of Rhodes and Currie in the Romanesque Revival style at an approximate cost of $20,000 and the congregation officially became known as St. Paul's. The church was dedicated by the Rev. Dr. James Robertson who was a well known Western Canada Missions superintendent. In 1902 a hall was built in nearby Caledonia. In 1903 Knox (now Knox United Church, Glace Bay) congregation was formed by members of St. Paul's. Rev Forbes resigned, and the Rev. D.M. Gillies was inducted as Minister of St. Paul's. In 1905, St Luke's Church in Donkin became a separate congregation. in 1908 a pipe organ was installed by the firm of Casavant Frères. In 1909 Warden Church, New Aberdeen, became self-sustaining.

== Fire and rebuilding ==
In 1912, a fire destroyed the interior of the church. Rebuilding the facilities took some time. The 50th anniversary of St Paul's was in 1916 but was not celebrated until 1918.

In 1925, The Presbyterian Church in Canada voted to merge with the Methodist Church of Canada and the Congregationalist Union to form the United Church of Canada. St. Paul's congregation, and about 30% of other Presbyterian congregations in Canada, voted not to participate in the merger and remained independent of the newly formed church. The terms Continuing Presbyterians and Non-Concurring Presbyterians were then used by those who did not participate in the merger. St. Paul's and those other congregations regained the legal right to use the name "Presbyterian Church in Canada" in 1939 when the Supreme Court of Canada found that the United Church, while initially holding the rights as the successor to the original Presbyterian Church in Canada, had effectively vacated the name through non use, and it was available to the non-concurring Presbyterians.

In 1950, a new hall was completed at St. Paul's and the Alexander MacDonald Memorial Hall was established in Caledonia. The pipe organ was rebuilt in 1964.

The 100th Anniversary was celebrated in 1966 with special services on September 27, October 2 with a Gaelic language service, October 9, and October 16 with a Chinese language service. As a special project of the congregation for the 100th Anniversary, new stained glass windows were installed in the sanctuary. The windows were designed by Gerald E. Mesterom and built by Montreal Stained Glass and Art Works of Pointe-Claire, Quebec. They were dedicated by the Moderator of the General Assembly, Rev. Dr. G. Deane Johnston of Brantford, Ontario.

In 1970, St. Paul's entered a float in the Glace Bay Centennial Parade which won first prize in the historical category.

On November 6, 1983, the War Veterans Memorial Plaque was dedicated. Nova Scotia Premier John Buchanan was a special guest for the event.

== New beginnings ==
In 1984 the future of the then current church building began to be discussed. Concerns about structural integrity, repair costs, and functionality were raised as the congregation struggled with the choice of trying to correct the problems in the existing structure or move to a new building. In 1991 a decision was made to construct a new church on Brookside Street in Glace Bay and in July architects Gavel and Associates began designing the new facility. In 1993, the sod was turned on the new construction site.

Due to construction problems and financial issues, costs on the new church went far over expectations and the congregation faced a potentially crippling debt. Through sacrifices by the congregation and assistance from other Presbyterian churches, the debt was reduced from 1.1 million dollars to something just over $200,000 between 1995 and 2000. On March 23, 2005, the final payment was made on the loan. St. Paul's paid $600,000 towards the loan, and the Presbyterian Church raised $569,172. The joyous event, commemorated by a thanksgiving service in May, marked the end of what had once been a crushing debt that existed since 1993.

At present, the congregation meets at the church on Brookside Street and the old St Paul's site on Commercial Street was demolished and turned into a park.

== Ministers of St. Paul's ==
- 1867-1875 Rev. Alex Farquharson
- 1877-1878 Rev. Alan McLean
- 1881-1903 Rev. James A. Forbes
- 1903-1926 Rev. Donald. M. Gillies
- 1927-1931 Rev. F. Wight Tingley
- 1932-1939 Rev. Charles S. Miller
- 1940-1944 Rev. W. Scott Duncan
- 1945-1954 Rev. Samuel Kerr
- 1955-1958 Rev. W.D. Nicholson
- 1959-1963 Rev. Rev. Murray Fraser
- 1963-1967 Rev. Wallace MacKinnon
- 1968-1972 Rev. Paul Walker
- 1973-1984 Rev. Angus MacKinnon
- 1985-1989 Rev. David Sutherland
- 1991-1996 Rev. James Skinner
- 2002- 2010 Rev. Michael W. A. Henderson
- 2010–Present Rev. Shirley Murdock

On five occasions, Rev. Dr. E.H. Bean served as interim Moderator for St. Paul's.
