= Canadian Credit Union Association =

Trade association

- Association canadienne des coopératives financières
- Abbreviation: CCUA
- Formation: 1953
- Type: Cooperative federation
- Purpose: Trade association
- Headquarters: 20 Queen St. West, Suite 2301A; Toronto, Ontario
- President: Jeff Guthrie
- Website: ccua.com

The Canadian Credit Union Association (CCUA; French: Association canadienne des coopératives financières) is the national trade association for credit unions in Canada (outside the province of Quebec). Founded in 1953, it rebranded to its current name in January 2016 to reflect its "evolving role as an association that is focused on growing a stronger... credit union industry."

CCUA was founded as the Canadian Co-operative Credit Society (CCCS) to support a growing credit union system in the 1950s. It was renamed to Credit Union Central of Canada in 1993 to better reflect its relationship to its provincial member credit union centrals before rebranding to its current name in January 2016 to reflect its evolving role in fostering a stronger Canadian credit union industry.

== Structure and membership ==
The Canadian Credit Union Association (CCUA) is the national credit union trade association that provides services to Canada's credit unions, caisses populaires (outside of Quebec) and regional Central organizations. CCUA works to improve federal and provincial legislation impacting credit unions and advocates for supportive legislative and regulatory policy development. It provides a national voice on behalf of Canada's credit unions and raises awareness of credit unions among Canadians, helping the credit union sector grow and compete within the Canadian financial services landscape. CCUA also provides professional development and education, webinars, conferences, research and other services for the benefit of its members. CCUA is governed by a board of directors appointed by its member credit unions and centrals.

== History ==
The Canadian credit union movement began in 1900 with the foundation of a Caisse Populaire – the French-Canadian equivalent of a credit union – in Levis, Quebec. Its founder, Alphonse Desjardins, was a French stenographer in the federal House of Commons in Ottawa. To facilitate the exchange of savings and to help local credit unions become more efficient, credit union leaders in all the English-speaking provinces organized provincial centrals (called co-operative credit societies or credit union leagues).

The Canadian Co-operative Credit Society (CCCS) was owned by the provincial centrals and for the first half of the 1900s, the association evolved to become the system's financial facility and provided access for credit unions at the national payment systems.

In 1953, some of the centrals, along with other nonfinancial co-operatives, organized the Canadian Co-operative Credit Society (CCCS), a national organization used primarily to transfer funds among the centrals. CCCS was owned by the provincial centrals and for the first half of the 1900s, before later becoming the Credit Union Central of Canada, a federally regulated financial institution.

By the early 1950s the Canadian credit union system saw the development of two different but related types of organizations: a national trade association to be a convening body and voice for the system, and a national finance facility to provide liquidity to support a distinctly Canadian credit union organization.

=== National trade association ===
Beginning in 1908 and accelerating in the 1930s, credit unions were incorporated provincially in small communities and rural areas of the Maritimes, Ontario, the Prairies and British Columbia, while in Quebec, a federated caisse populaire network developed very differently from the rest of the country.

The first attempt to create a national association of credit unions took place at the Quebec Congress of the Co-operative Union of Canada in 1943. While these talks failed to make progress, efforts two years later proved more successful. The Canadian Federation of Credit Unions was created in 1945 to "compile statistics on Canadian credit unions; to assist in lobbying for more effective credit union legislation; to assist in education programs on behalf of credit unions; [and] to encourage [provincial credit union] Leagues to affiliate with provincial sections of the Co-operative Union of Canada."

A short time later, the Canadian Federation of Credit Unions became the Canadian Section of the US-based Credit Union National Association (CUNA), continuing to serve the purpose of providing a discussion forum and lobby group for the credit union system at a national level. In the years that followed, this organization, which had evolved out of the cross-border collaboration that had developed the credit union movement in English-speaking North America, competed for trade association functions with the National Association of Canadian Credit Unions which was founded in 1958.

=== National finance facility ===
In response to the growth of credit unions in communities across Canada, centrals began to be created in the 1930s at the provincial level to provide liquidity, risk management and shared services.

Following years of preparatory work by the provincial centrals and the Co-operative Union of Canada to create a "central of centrals" at the federal level, in 1953 the Canadian Co-operative Credit Society (CCCS) was incorporated by a special act of Parliament. It was created to provide a national financial intermediary at the federal level to support a growing credit union system. For the first few years after its creation, these functions were seldom used.

However, increased sophistication in Canada's payments system and liquidity demands during the mid-1970s led to increased reliance on the CCCS. In 1977, reflecting "a desire within the Canadian co-operative movement to create a true national liquidity pool", CCCS was restructured to include nine (up from five) provincial centrals. The increased capitalization that resulted from this, as well as an increasing interest in credit unions from federal policy makers led to CCCS becoming a formidable national organization. As historian Ian MacPherson notes:

"By the late seventies, CCCS was responsible for lobbying with the federal government. It was increasingly more active in providing liquidity for the national system. It was negotiating loans from co-operative banks in Europe and the United States. Thus, for a few years in the late 1970s, 25 years after it had been organized, credit union and co-operative leaders from across the country were giving CCCS the attention it deserved."

In 1978, CCCS formally merged with the National Association of Canadian Credit Unions bringing together the finance facility and trade association functions.

In 1993 the Canadian Co-operative Credit Society was renamed Credit Union Central of Canada. It was led by five chief executive officers: Brian F. Downey (1986–1995), Bill Knight (1995–2001), Joanne De Laurentiis (2001–2006), David Phillips (2006–2014) and Martha Durdin (2014–2015).

=== Transformation and wind-up ===
In 2010, Credit Union Central of Canada began the process of replacing or transferring its regulated responsibilities as a finance facility in order to focus on its activities as a national trade association.

This transformation was formalized at the end of 2015 with the formal wind-up of the Central and the transfer of its remaining assets and responsibilities under a new name as the Canadian Credit Union Association.

== Credit union centrals in Canada ==
- Atlantic Central (represents credit unions in New Brunswick, Newfoundland and Labrador, Nova Scotia and Prince Edward Island)
- Central 1 Credit Union (represents credit unions in British Columbia and Ontario)
- Credit Union Central of Alberta
- Credit Union Central of Manitoba
- SaskCentral (represents credit unions in Saskatchewan)

== See also ==
- Antigonish Movement
- Desjardins Group
- Humanomics
- Ian MacPherson (historian)
