= Gordon United Church (Reserve Mines) =

Church in Reserve Mines, Nova Scotia, Canada

Coordinates: 46°10′53.3″N 60°1′13″W

Gordon United Church

Gordon United Church in the village of Reserve Mines, Nova Scotia was founded as a Presbyterian church in the 1880s by Rev. James Forbes, as an offshoot of his nearby charge, St. Paul's Presbyterian Church which was located in Glace Bay.

Gordon became independent and a self-sustaining pastoral charge in its own right in 1897.

When the Presbyterian Church in Canada voted to form the United Church of Canada in 1925, Gordon affiliated with the new United Church and became known as Gordon United Church.

The last service was held here in November, 2014.
