= Lambert Todd =

Canadian Standardbred racehorse

Lambert Todd was a Standardbred racehorse foaled in 1916 in Ontario, the son of Jim Todd (2.08.1) and Gracie Lambert.

Lambert Todd performed in the grand circuit before going to Reserve Mines, Nova Scotia in 1929, where he performed against other community horses. He is believed to be the first community-owned racehorse. His record time is 2.02.1, and he was the first horse to break the 2.10.0 time in the Maritimes (Halifax) against a car. Lambert Todd broke 14 track records and had a lifetime record of 312 heats, 138 wins, 64 seconds and 49 thirds, with earnings of $9,700. Every year, the Lambert Todd Days take place in Reserve Mines in early July. The Lambert Todd Pace, which started in October 2007 at Northside Downs, was won by Master Of Ceremony in 1.59.1.

Also here are some other race horses that were either owned trained or driven by a Reserve Mines Citizen.

Flaming Hanover - The trotting king in the 1980s with a lifetime best of 2.04 at Sydney for owner trainer driver Julien Frison. Julien Frison later owned trained and drove the iron mare- Boxoffice - with a lifetime best of 2.00.4 at Sydney and impressively raced 442 times with 59 wins.

Cruisinart- Owned and trained by Johnny Heffernan. The Pacing Machine showed Northside Downs (North Sydney) and Inverness Raceway how to leave like a rocket. The gelding under the care of Mr. Heffernan went impressive miles 1.55 and change over Northside Downs and he was a crowd pleaser. The gelding pacer even made the trip to Prince Edward Island to the Gold Cup and Saucer the Maritimes biggest race. Cruisinart clocked miles in 1.54 and change over the Red Half Mile.

Dumas Walker came into the scene 2013 and captured the 2yr old Colt Maritime Breeders and Atlantic Sires Championship. The colt co-owned by Joey Poirier was followed on Facebook and he did not let the crowds and followers down winning 9 out of 12 in his two-year-old campaign. The colt named after a famous Kentucky Headhunters song was the talk of the maritime tracks. Horse racing in the local community is coming back with the following of these horses and the future stars through social media and live stream races. Junebugs Baby brought back horse racing in the neighbouring community of Dominion and still has many followers for the stallion owned by John and Fraser Thurnbull.
