= Labour Bank =

A Labour Bank (労働金庫), or Rōkin (ろうきん) is an organization akin to a credit union in Japan. There are currently 13 Labour Banks, which are united in the National Association of Labour Banks.

Labour Banks are actually given a unique status in the Japanese financial system, being regulated by the 1953 Labour Bank Law, which reads in part:

The goals of Labour Banks are to attempt to provide more accessible financing for the welfare and mutual aid efforts of labor unions and consumer-livelihood cooperatives, promote sound growth, and, at the same time, contribute to improving the financial status of workers.

They claim in their self-description that:

Labour Banks are not managed for profit-making purposes. Labour Banks are managed impartially, democratically, and not for profit-making purposes, in accordance with the Labour Bank Law. The circle of people who share an interest in Labour Banks’ unique form of management extends throughout Japan, and there are now approximately 10 million constituents nationwide. Along with working people in labor unions and consumer-livelihood cooperatives, Labour Banks are used extensively by many other working people.

They offer special financial services to unions, victims of disasters, welfare NPOs, the unemployed, and so forth.
