= Ian MacPherson (historian) =

Canadian historian

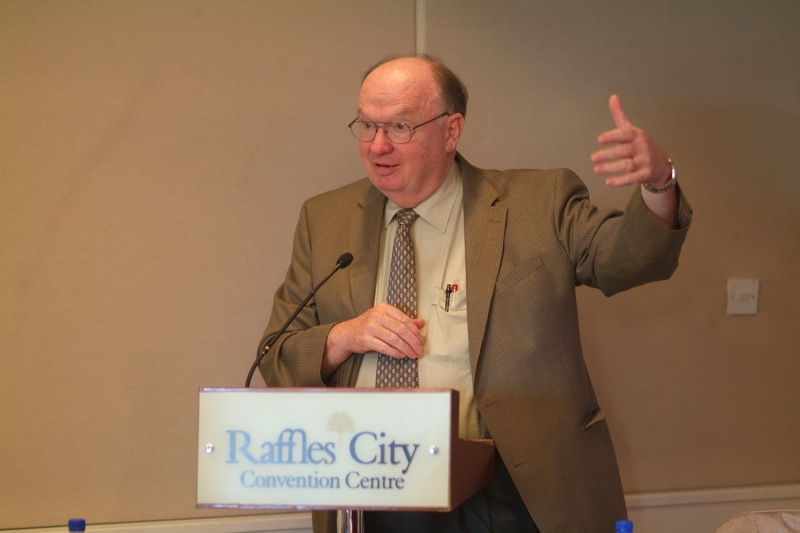
- MacPherson speaking in Singapore in 2007.
- Born: 1939; Toronto, Ontario, Canada
- Died: November 16, 2013 (aged 73–74)
- Occupation: historian

Ian MacPherson (1939 – November 16, 2013) was a Canadian historian, and a supporter of the co-operative movement. MacPherson was born in Toronto, Ontario.

== Education ==
MacPherson received his B.A. from the University of Windsor in 1960. After working as a high school teacher for four years, he returned to school, earning his M.A. and Ph.D. degrees in History from the University of Western Ontario.

== Academic life ==
MacPherson taught at the University of Winnipeg for 8 years, and founded the Canadian Studies program there. In 1976, he moved to the History Department at the University of Victoria, serving as Chair from 1981 to 1989. He became Dean of the Faculty of Humanities in 1992, but stepped down in 1999 to establish the B.C. Institute for Co-operative Studies (BCICS), later renamed the Centre for Co-operative and Community-Based Economy (CCCBE). He retired from BCICS in 2008. From 2005 to 2013 he served as co-director and Principal Investigator of the National Hub of the Canadian Social Economy Research Partnerships.

=== Focus of scholarship ===
Most of MacPherson's work focused on the Canadian and international co-operative movement, but he also wrote on a nineteenth-century Ontario family (the Buells of Brockville), Canadian Prairie rural history, urban history, the history of the Canadian north, and the history of the University of Victoria. Over the course of his career he wrote, edited or co-edited over twenty books and 190 articles. He also participated in over 300 conference sessions and workshops in more than 70 countries. The main goal of his work was to establish Co-operative Studies as a legitimate and important field of study.

== Involvement with the Co-operative movement ==
MacPherson served as an elected leader in numerous co-operatives, including consumers' cooperatives in Winnipeg and Victoria, health co-operatives in Winnipeg and Victoria, a child care co-operative in Victoria, and several credit unions in Victoria, including Pacific Coast Savings. He was a member of the BC Central Credit Union board, the Canadian Co-operative Credit Society, the Co-operative Union of Canada, and the International Co-operative Alliance (ICA). He was the founding President of the Canadian Co-operative Association in 1989. As part of his work with the ICA, he led the process and wrote the basic documents for the Co-operative Identity Statement adopted by the ICA at its Manchester Congress in 1995. It included the first internationally accepted definition of a co-operative, a statement of the basic values of the movement, and a revised set of principles for co-operative organisations.

=== Awards ===
- Rochdale Pioneers Award, International Co-operative Alliance, 2005
- Canadian Association for Studies in Co-operation (CASC) – CASC Merit Award 2002
- 2002 Association of Co-operative Educators award for outstanding contributions to co-operative education and training.
- First Recipient, Canadian Co-operative Association Achievement Award, Canadian Co-operative Association, 2001
- BC Credit Unions – Distinguished Service Award (twice)
- Canadian Co-operative Association (BC Region) – Distinguished Co-operator Award, 2000
- World Council of Credit Unions (WOCCU) - Credit Union Ambassador Award, 2000.
- Canadian Credit Union Hall of Fame Member, 2000

== Selected bibliography ==
- Reaching Outward and Upward: The University of Victoria, 1963-2013 (Montreal and Kingston: McGill University Press, 2012)
- (with Peter Hall, eds.), Community-University Research Partnerships: Reflections on the Canadian Social Economy Experience (Victoria: University of Victoria e-books, 2012).
- Responding, Remembering, Restructuring: Presentations in Japan and Korea, March, 2008. (Victoria: New Rochdale Press, 2008) (Japanese edition published by The Siekatsu Club, Japan, 2009).
- A Century of Co-operation, (Ottawa: the Canadian Co-operative Association, 2009)
- Ed., One Path to Co-operative Studies: A Selection of Papers and Presentation (Victoria: New Rochdale Press, 2008).
- (with Erin McLaughlin-Jenkins. eds.), Integrating Diversities within a Complex Heritage: Essays in the Field of Co-operative Studies (Victoria: New Rochdale Press, 2008).
- Hands around the globe : a history of the international credit union movement and the role and development of World Council of Credit Unions, Inc. (Victoria: Horsdal & Schubart Publishers Ltd., 1999.)
- Co-operative principles for the 21st century (Geneva: International Co-Operative Alliance, 1996)
- Co-operation, conflict and consensus : B.C. Central and the credit union movement to 1994 (Vancouver: B.C. Central Credit Union, 1995.)
- Building and protecting the co-operative movement: a brief history of the Co-operative Union of Canada, 1909-84 (Ottawa: Co-operative Union of Canada, no date.)
- Matters of loyalty : the Buells of Brockville, 1830-1850 (Belleville: Mika Pub. Co., 1981)
- Co-operative movement on the prairies, 1900-1955 (Ottawa : Canadian Historical Association, 1979.)
- Each for all : a history of the co-operative movement in English Canada, 1900-1945 (Toronto: Macmillan of Canada, 1979.)
