= BC Tree Fruits Cooperative =

- Type: Grower-owned cooperative
- Industry: Food and beverage services
- Founded: 1936
- Headquarters: Kelowna, Canada
- Area served: Okanagan, British Columbia
- Revenue: $55.7 million (2023)
- Members: 230 (2024)
- Number of employees: 242 (2024)
- Website: http://www.bctreefruits.com

The BC Tree Fruits Cooperative was a grower-owned cooperative based in the Okanagan region of British Columbia. It processed, stored, packaged, and sold fruit. It had more than 230 member farms in 2024.

After operating for almost 90 years, in July 2024 the co-op announced that it was dissolving and seeking court direction to liquidate its assets. As reasons for the closure, the company cited "extremely low estimated fruit volumes, weather effects and difficult market and financial conditions".

== History ==
The BC Tree Fruits Cooperative was founded in 1936. The co-op stored, packed, and sold fruit produced by its members (growers and orchard owners) in the Okanagan region of British Columbia. Its operations expanded to include a fruit grower equipment supply company, a fresh fruit market in Kelowna and, in 2014, a craft cider company.

For decades, the BC Tree Fruit Cooperative was known to consumers across Canada for its bright green leaf logo that adorned fruit packaging and apple stickers. The co-op's slogan was "Look for the Leaf". In 2017, BC Tree Fruits Cooperative had 430 grower members.

In 2022, there was opposition from a large proportion of the co-op's membership to decisions made by the board of directors on the sale of co-op assets, and the decision to shutter the Lake Country fruit packing house (which forced central and north Okanagan growers to ship their fruit to Oliver in the south Okanagan). At a special general meeting in November 2022, growers voted 59% in favour of removing the entire board, a result that was short of the required two-thirds majority. A special general meeting on 5 February 2024 saw 70% of the co-op's voting members reject motions that aimed to unseat four of the board's ten members and change the decision-making process regarding property sales.

== Closure ==
In July 2024, the cooperative said it would no longer receive fruit at its packing facilities and advised members to find an alternative to market fruit for the balance of the season. The co-op was dissolving due to decreased fruit volumes from adverse weather events, increased competition, a reduction in grower members, and aging facilities. In 2024, many Okanagan fruit farmers faced catastrophic crop losses from poor weather that included a cold snap in January that wiped out almost all the Okanagan valley's peach, apricot, and nectarine crops, and severely damaged cherry orchards. The co-op's primary revenue source was from the sale of apples (followed by cherries and other fruits), and apple volumes declined significantly from 122 million pounds in 2018 to 60 million pounds in 2023. The company sought to right-size its operations through sales of surplus real estate and modernization of its operations in a new facility located in Oliver, but overall bank indebtedness rose through 2024.

== Protests ==
Industry representatives and growers protested the closure of BC Tree Fruits, asking the British Columbia government to intervene. Some wanted the province to backstop a loan to allow the co-op to reopen, at least through the 2024 harvest. Protesters argued that private packers did not have the capacity to take all the fruit being produced; and that, unlike BC Tree Fruits, private packers do not provide a guaranteed price. However, others argued against the co-op taking on more debt and the associated interest costs, noting that more than half of the grower members had already found an alternative packing or storage facility.

== Bankruptcy proceedings ==
BC Tree Fruits Cooperative filed for creditor protection in August 2024. Court documents showed the co-op owed CA$53.2 million (equivalent to $54.3 million in 2025) to secured creditors. Overall debts were reported to be around $65 million ($66.3 million in 2025). The Supreme Court of British Columbia ordered the sale of the co-op's assets, and equipment asset sales concluded on 4 September 2024.

At the court hearing on August 26, the lawyer for the creditor protection monitor said there were expressions of interest from buyers for some of the co-op's plants and the sale of its Vaughan Avenue, Kelowna, plant was finalized for $22 million (equivalent to $22.5 million in 2025). Bidding deadlines for assets were to close by November because of the interest in properties and the need to provide processing and storage facilities for the 2024 harvest season.

On 6 September 2024, Kelowna-based Novem Pharmaceuticals offered to purchase BC Tree Fruits Cooperative's Sexsmith Road storage facility in Kelowna. The company said it obtained an emergency lease that would run through the fruit season, or upon closing of the purchase transaction, in order to allow the tree-fruit industry to store their fruit in the facility and avoid the loss of as many as 25 million pounds of apples.

On 12 September, the British Columbia government said the Investment Agriculture Foundation of B.C. (which is responsible for delivering many government-funded agricultural programs) would direct about $4 million (equivalent to $4.1 million in 2025) to pay co-op members amounts they are owed by BC Tree Fruits, and it would recoup the funds at the end of the court process.

=== 2025 Private operator ===
In May 2025, the final significant transaction as a part of the bankruptcy process was the $22.75 million sale of the co-op's former packinghouse in Oliver to Penticton-based Wildstone Construction. Also included in the transaction were properties in Summerland and Keremeos, remaining equipment, inventory, and intellectual property including the green leaf logo. Wildstone said it was partnering with a local investor group and Ontario-based Algoma Orchards to operate the new venture under the BC Tree Fruits name. The bankruptcy trustee, Alvarez and Marshall, said the original BC Tree Fruits co-op would be able to repay all outstanding claims against it with the sale of these final assets.
