= Margaree River =

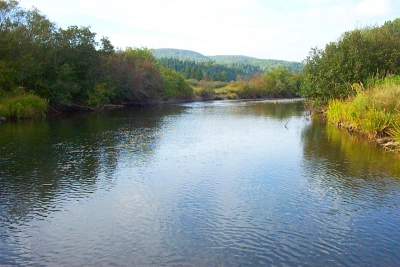
- The Margaree River at Gillisdale

Location
- Country: Canada
- Province: Nova Scotia

Physical characteristics
- Mouth
  - location: Gulf of Saint Lawrence
  - coordinates: 46°25′38.3″N 61°5′50.4″W
  - elevation: sea level
- Length: 120 km (75 mi)
- Basin size: 1,375 km^{2} (531 sq mi)

The Margaree River (Abhainn Mhargaraidh) is a river on Cape Breton Island in Nova Scotia. The northeast branch of the river derives from the watershed of the Cape Breton Highlands, while the Southwest Margaree flows northeast from Lake Ainslie. The two branches join at Margaree Forks. The river then flows north to empty into the Gulf of Saint Lawrence at Margaree Harbour, Nova Scotia. The river is 120 km in length and drains an area of 1,375 km². The Margaree has been well known for a century for its trout and Atlantic salmon sport fishery, that draws anglers from near and far. Fishing is highly regulated now and is restricted to fly fishing only, with barbless hooks, in the main stem of the river. Famed American angler and Atlantic salmon conservationist Lee Wulff caught his first salmon on a fly on the Margaree in 1933.

The gravel bars of the upper Northeast Margaree provide spawning grounds for Atlantic salmon; its steep valleys provide habitat for American marten and the rare Gaspé shrew. The Margaree Valley includes a mix of farms and woodlands.

During the 18th century, Acadians settled along the coast near the mouth of the river; the French name for this river was St. Marguerite. Scottish Highlanders began to settle in the Margaree Valley at the beginning of the 19th century.

Moses Coady, a noted son of the Margaree Valley, attended school in Margaree Forks and later, taught there before completing his education in Antigonish and Rome.

The Margaree was designated a Canadian Heritage River in 1998.

HMCS Margaree, a World War II Canadian naval destroyer, was named after this river.

== See also ==
- List of rivers of Nova Scotia
