= Lake Ainslie =

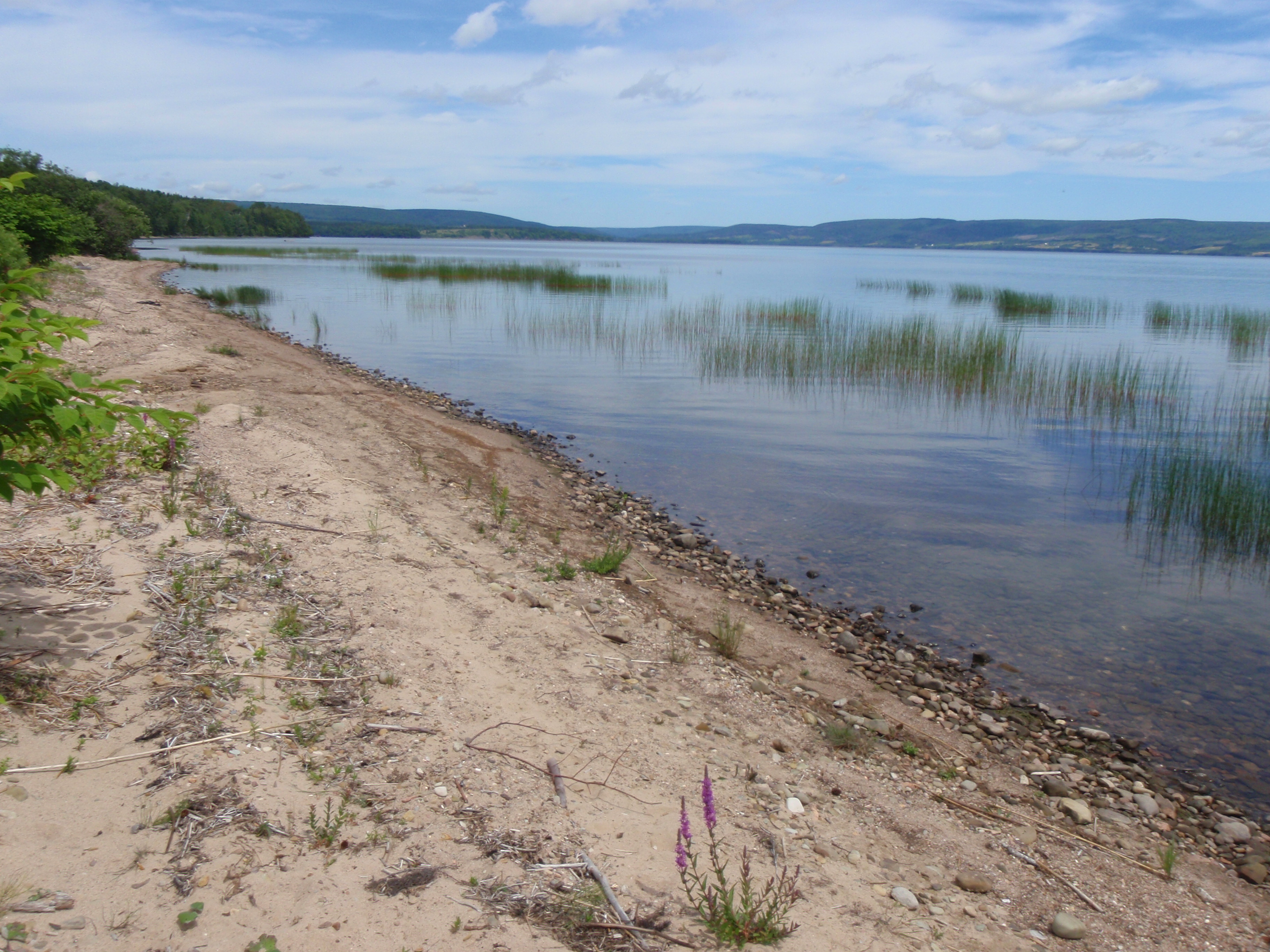
- The western shore of Lake Ainslie

- Location within Nova Scotia
- Location: Inverness County, Nova Scotia
- Coordinates: 46°7′36″N 61°10′34″W
- Type: Glacial Lake
- Primary inflows: Trout Brook
- Primary outflows: Margaree River
- Basin countries: Canada
- Max. length: 20 km (12 mi)
- Max. width: 7 km (4.3 mi)
- Surface area: 57.4 km^{2} (22.2 sq mi)
- Average depth: 5.75 m (18.9 ft)
- Max. depth: 18 m (59 ft)
- Water volume: 0.33 km^{3} (270,000 acre⋅ft)
- Surface elevation: 57 m (187 ft)
- Islands: none
- Settlements: Municipality of the County of Inverness

Lake Ainslie is the largest natural freshwater lake in Nova Scotia. The Southwest Margaree River starts at the lake and empties into the Gulf of Saint Lawrence. The lake is approximately 20 kilometres (12 mi) long and averages 5 kilometres (3.1 mi) in width.

It was formed during the Pleistocene, about two million years ago, when glacial outwash blocked the drainage of the valley of Loch Ban. It is underlain primarily by sedimentary deposits of the Horton and Windsor Formations, dating back about 350 million years.

The lake was named in honour of Lieutenant-Governor George Robert Ainslie. He was Lieutenant-Governor of Cape Breton Island. Ainsley Township, one of the four subdivisions of the northwestern part of Cape Breton Island, was formed in 1828.

Previous to 1816, the lake was known as Marguerite, which gives the name to the river which flows from it.
