= Humanomics =

Humanomics is a national initiative that was launched by a number of credit unions across Canada on May 1, 2014. The purpose of the Program is to bring a human focus to the concept of economics, by having the participating credit unions support their communities by re-investing profits, and provide opportunities to improve Canadians’ financial well-being.

Part of their work to bring the Humanomics Program to the market involved the credit unions commissioning a national poll to gauge Canadians’ financial behaviours. The research showed that the majority of respondents feel that financial institutions have a role to play when it comes to improving the financial well-being of Canadians.

Through the Humanomics Program, the participating credit unions work together to raise awareness about the importance of financial literacy, and bring innovative financial products and offers to the market that encourage healthy financial habits among Canadians.

Youth are a primary target audience for Humanomics, and the first product offered through the Humanomics Program was the Humanomics Youth Savings Account which is designed to reward positive savings behaviour. The account was available to youth aged 11–12 years old, and each account opening came with a free youth workbook that is designed to encourage conversations about money between youth and their parents, and a moneybank which is separated into three compartments for Spend, Save and Donate.

The following credit unions are currently part of Humanomics, with more to join in the future: Coast Capital Savings (British Columbia), Conexus Credit Union (Saskatchewan), Credit Union Atlantic (Nova Scotia), Enderby & District Financial (British Columbia), Envision Financial (British Columbia), Innovation Credit Union (Saskatchewan), Prospera Credit Union (British Columbia), Sunshine Coast Credit Union (British Columbia) and Valley First (British Columbia).

== Humanomics trademark ==
The original Humanomics trademark application was filed with the Canadian Intellectual Property Office (An Agency of Industry Canada) on March 14, 2014.
