= Moses Coady =

Canadian priest (1882–1959)

- Born: 3 January 1882; Margaree Valley, Nova Scotia
- Died: 28 July 1959 (aged 77); Antigonish, Nova Scotia
- Resting place: St. Ninian's Parish Cemetery
- Education: St. Francis Xavier University
- Occupations: Priest; co-operative organiser

Moses Michael Coady (3 January 1882 – 28 July 1959) was a Roman Catholic priest, adult educator and co-operative entrepreneur best known for his instrumental role in the Antigonish Movement. Credited with introducing "an entirely new organizational technique: that of action based on preliminary study" to the co-operative movement in Canada, his work sparked a wave of co-operative development across the Maritimes and credit union development across English Canada. Due to his role and influence, he is often compared to Alphonse Desjardins in Québec. The influence of the movement he led spread across Canada in the 1930s and by the 1940s and 1950s, to the Caribbean, Africa and Asia.

== Early years ==
Born into a large Irish Catholic family on a farm in the Margaree Valley of Cape Breton, Nova Scotia, Moses was the eldest boy in a family of twelve. As a youth he was very concerned at the scale of outmigration from the valley: young men and women leaving for the steel mills and coal mines, or taking up jobs as domestics in the "Boston States". He determined he would get a good education so he could help people make their farms more profitable and give them a reason to stay on the land.

Coady would draw on an unusual combination of gifts, having ‘the soul of a poet’ and ‘the mind of a mathematician’. After graduating top of his class at ‘St. FX’ (St. Francis Xavier University) in Antigonish in 1905, Coady was persuaded by his first cousin Jimmy Tompkins to enter the priesthood. He followed Tompkins to Rome, where he studied theology and philosophy.

Moses Coady lived in Havre Boucher during the early 1900s and served as the communities Parish Priest for 8 years. He is accounted for on the 1903 Census as Moses Codie.

== Fighting a "weird pessimism" ==
After his ordination in Rome in 1910, Coady began teaching at St. FX. He put on special classes for students at risk of failing, and prided himself on being able to teach maths to anyone. He honed his considerable oratorical skills and developed a talent for making complex concepts easily understood.

Emigration from Nova Scotia continued, and Coady fought against a kind of "weird pessimism (that) so benumbed everybody that nothing has been attempted to break the spell." In 1921 he helped organize the province's school teachers. Typically earning about $35 a month, four out of five were young women who lost their jobs as soon as they married. At a meeting of the teachers’ fragile union in Truro that year he urged action and was elected secretary-treasurer. He spent much of the next 3 years expanding support for the union and founding/editing the Nova Scotia Teachers’ Bulletin.

The defining moment in Coady's career came when he testified before a Canadian government commission in 1927. Drawing on his own experience and that of other Movement leaders like Jimmy Tompkins and Hugh MacPherson (an early co-operative pioneer) he maintained that the local economy could be revitalized if the right type of learning was cultivated in ordinary people: especially critical thinking, scientific methods of planning and production, and co-operative entrepreneurship.

== Launching a movement ==
The report of the MacLean Commission was catalytic: in late 1928 St. FX organized an Extension Department to carry adult education to the people of the province, appointing Coady as its first director. The Canadian Department of Fisheries asked Coady to help the government "organize the fishermen".

Through the years of the Antigonish Movement, financial support came from St. FX, the Carnegie Corporation and the Rockefeller Foundation (two New York-based charities), and the local Scottish Catholic Society. Coady's own staff resources were supplemented by collaboration with the Department of Fisheries, and later by widespread volunteerism in the villages.

The chronic decline in the fisheries gained new urgency with the onset of the Great Depression. Mines closed and thousands of miners were thrown out of work. Out-migration slowed, but for all the wrong reasons. Many jobless emigrants returned home.

Through the new department, Coady linked adult education with co-operative business ventures in the distinctive blend that became known as the Antigonish Movement. The immediate priorities of the Extension Department were the formation of ‘study clubs’, the emergence of new co-operatives and a school for leaders.

Study clubs gave Maritimers an opportunity to analyze the dynamics that kept them poor and to study possible solutions. The clubs helped people to plan and then launch co-operatives in many fields: agricultural marketing, fish canning, dairy, retail sales and housing. Once the co-operatives were launched, the school for leaders kept their managers and directors continually stimulated with new ideas and business methods.

Coady also invested considerable energy in catalyzing and strengthening wholesale co-operatives around the Maritimes: including the United Maritime Fishermen, the United Fruit Companies of Nova Scotia and the Canadian Livestock Co-operatives (Maritimes). For example, he brokered conflicting interests and provided timely technical support in the formation of the United Maritime Fishermen. UMF was a trade association for the region's fishing co-ops "with a strong adult education component". It promoted canneries and provided cooperative marketing services to fishermen to help them capture a greater share of the profit from their catch.

== High tide in Antigonish ==
The period from 1929 until World War II marked the high tide of the Antigonish Movement. For a discussion of the ideas and techniques of the movement, see the Antigonish Movement.

The leaders of the movement saw themselves as developing the full potential economic, social and cultural potential within the people of the region. "But perhaps the most important reason why the Antigonish movement was able to have a significant, lasting impact was its promotion of credit unions" which delivered microfinance. The farmers, fishers and miners who formed the backbone of the movement had little access to credit before the Great Depression, and lost what little they had as the downturn started to bite.

When the Antigonish movement looked for external allies in credit union development, it did not seek them from the movement in Quebec, where Alphonse Desjardins had founded the first credit union movement in North America three decades earlier. Instead, it looked across the border to the United States – to Roy Bergengren and Credit Union National of America. Bergengren drafted a credit union law for Nova Scotia that was ratified by the provincial legislature in 1932.

That year Coady, MacDonald and Bergengren visited the fishing village of Broad Cove, where they helped the residents form the first credit union in the Maritimes.

By 1936 Coady was increasingly traveling beyond the Maritimes to Ontario, Saskatchewan and British Columbia, where his speeches and ideas helped ignite local credit union movements.

While results were not uniform, many of Coady's initiatives proved successful. By 1944 United Maritime Fishermen represented 70 member fishing co-ops around Nova Scotia and New Brunswick. That year it sold $1.4 million in product, including $400,000 in lobsters into New England.

By 1945 there were over 400 credit unions in the Maritimes, with 70,000 members and $4.2 million in assets.

== Later years ==
By the end of World War II credit unions and other co-operatives dotted the Maritimes, transforming the lives of thousands of people. Coady was honoured within the co-operative movement and beyond. He was featured on a national radio program of the Canadian Broadcasting Corporation on co-operatives in 1940. In 1946 the Vatican made him a Monsignor. In 1949 Coady was asked to address the Economic and Social Council of the United Nations. He argued that environmental problems stemmed from ignorance of science, concentration of rural land ownership in the hands of a few, and exploitation of land primarily for profit.

In spite of the success and public recognition, Coady's optimism and faith in people were tested in the later years of his life. Some co-operative leaders had committed fraud, while others had sold out their community's resources to vested interests. Some fishermen sold their fish for "half a cent less" to the very middlemen whose monopolistic behavior their co-ops had been formed to discipline.

As the co-ops gradually became larger and more professional, many ordinary members lost their connection, and reverted to the ‘weird pessimism’ that had bothered Coady in his youth.

During the 1940s and 1950s the Extension Department increasingly turned its attention to international development.

After suffering a major heart attack, Coady stepped down as Director of the Extension Department on February 5, 1952. He was 70, and would continue to work nationally and internationally as Director Emeritus of the Extension Department, now with 25 staff, until his death.

In his dying days, Coady told his bishop that he was at peace with God and that "If I die, I die happy in the thought that my blueprint is being realized much more surely than I ever had a right to expect." On his death at age 77, two fishermen, two farmers, a miner and a steelworker carried his body to a grave on a hill overlooking Antigonish.

Coady's only book, Masters of Their Own Destiny, was an expression of the philosophy of the movement. Still in print, it has been translated into seven languages. A volume of his speeches, The Man from Margaree, was published by Alexander Laidlaw in 1971. Numerous books have been written about both the man and the movement he led. During his life Coady received three honorary degrees (Boston, Ottawa, Ohio).

== Criticisms ==
Biographer Michael Welton (Little Mosie from the Margaree: A Biography of Moses Michael Coady, 2001) depicts Coady as a flawed man. "Coady’s agonal last few years reflect, I think, a profound state of hubris. No one can be certain how Coady deceived himself into thinking that he had a divine mission to liberate the peoples of the world." Welton compares this millenarian mindset to that of contemporaries Hitler and Stalin. He writes that although Coady tried to mask his feelings behind a veneer of faith in democracy and ordinary people, the veneer wore thin later in his life, and Coady's faith in others was replaced by a sense of betrayal and a tendency towards manipulation.

Another recent biographer, Jim Lotz (The Humble Giant: Moses Coady, Canada's Rural Revolutionary, 2005) criticizes Coady for precisely the opposite flaw: his unwillingness or perhaps inability to confront political corruption and rent seeking in his home province. "Coady’s belief in the power of ideas to change the hearts and actions of men and women came up against … the petty, patronage-ridden political system in Nova Scotia in the 1930s."

Lotz also documents the difficult relations between Coady and the Acadian co-operative movement. For example, the Rev. Alexandre Boudreau, a co-operative leader from the region of Chéticamp in Cape Breton claimed that Coady kept Acadians out of important positions in the Antigonish Movement.

And while acknowledging their debt to Coady and to the study club approach, Acadians felt like outsiders in the New Brunswick Credit Union League. This led to the emergence of a parallel Acadian federation in New Brunswick in 1946. Today, the credit union system in this officially bilingual province has over twice the market penetration of the system in Nova Scotia. Its performance is largely driven by the 200,000 member Mouvement des caisses populaires acadiennes.

In Nova Scotia the dynamism of the movement did not survive Coady's generation. Of 60,000 credit union members in Nova Scotia at the time of Coady's death in 1959, nearly half joined the movement during the period 1932–39, when Coady was spending most of his time in the villages. By contrast, the mantle of Alphonse Desjardins was inherited by very able successors like Cyrille Vaillancourt whose leadership and innovation continued to drive the Quebec movement from one success to the next.

In the words of Coady's protégé Alexander Laidlaw "if co-operatives are to be a true people’s movement, they must generate their own power from within." As historian Ian MacPherson shows in the case of British Columbia (another very successful province), enduring success results from multi-faceted roots – which in that case included active participation by an active agricultural cooperative system, urban unions, farmers organizations, the Catholic Church, private welfare groups and the Co-operative Commonwealth Federation.

== Legacy ==
The Board of Governors of St. Francis Xavier University established the Coady International Institute in Coady's honour less than six months after his death. The institute has played a dynamic role in the emergence of credit unions throughout the world, especially in Africa. Since then, over 6,000 community development practitioners from over 130 countries have studied at the campus in Antigonish, Nova Scotia.

Study clubs have been used widely in Africa, the Caribbean and South Asia in rural villages, and their method and approach anticipated the emergence of participatory rural appraisal in the 1980s and 1990s. Because study clubs increased the willingness and ability of poorer people to participate, they were one of the most significant innovations in credit unions since the first were formed by Friedrich Wilhelm Raiffeisen in rural Germany in 1864.

Coady, like Raiffeisen, Hermann Schulze-Delitzsch and Alphonse Desjardins was part of a global movement in co-operative microfinance. Due to the poor performance of many community-based credit unions in the developing world, this movement lost its momentum in the 1970s, to be replaced by the more centralized approach characteristic of the microcredit movement. However, the main successes in microcredit have been confined to urban or very densely populated rural areas. In recent years there has been a revival of interest in village-based and participatory approaches, such as the SHG movement in India and the ASCA movement in Africa to address the problem of financial services for poor rural farmers.

The Co-operative Union of Canada under the leadership of George Keen spread both the philosophy and the tools of the Antigonish Movement widely across Canada. Led by co-operative entrepreneurs like Jake Siemens, adult education became a priority in western Canada with the foundation of the Western Co-operative College in Saskatoon in 1955. (1893-1952), the Assistant Director of the Extension Department under Coady, rose to national leadership in the Union in 1945, from whence he led an increasing international engagement on behalf of Canadians. Coady described MacDonald as a brilliant man, capable of organizing and maintaining a far-flung network of study clubs and cooperatives, who had a "keen and penetrating mind, always ahead of the people yet practical enough to keep within the range of what was possible. He was radical enough in other words to be progressive, and, conservative enough to be sane."

== See also ==
- Rural community development
