= Jimmy Tompkins (priest) =

Canadian Roman Catholic priest

James Tompkins
- Tompkins (centre), 14 July 1949
- Born: 7 September 1870; Margaree Forks, Nova Scotia
- Died: 5 May 1953 (aged 82); Antigonish, Nova Scotia
- Occupation: Roman Catholic priest

Ecclesiastical career
- Religion: Christianity
- Church: Roman Catholic Church
- Ordained: 24 May 1902
- Congregations served: Stella Maris Church, Canso (1923-1934); St. Joseph's Church, Reserve Mines (1935-1948)

James John "Jimmy" Tompkins (7 September 1870 – 5 May 1953) was a Roman Catholic priest who founded the Antigonish Movement, a progressive effort that incorporated adult education, cooperatives and rural community development to aid the fishing and mining communities of northern and eastern Nova Scotia, Canada. The Antigonish Movement later evolved into the Extension Department (now the Coady International Center) of St. Francis Xavier University.

Father Tompkins believed in the emancipating power of education and sought to improve economic conditions through study groups and co-operative action. "It is not enough to have ideas, we have to put legs on them", he often said. He started the first regional library in Nova Scotia along with the first credit union and a cooperative housing association in Reserve Mines that was dubbed "Tompkinsville". Father Tompkins was the Spiritual founder of the Antigonish Movement.

== Brief biography ==
Jimmy Tompkins was born in Margaree Forks, Nova Scotia, a small farming community on Cape Breton Island. From 1888-1895, he attended St. Francis Xavier University in alternate semesters while teaching Greek and Mathematics to support himself. He attended the Urban College of the Congregatio de Propaganda Fide (Papal Congregation for the Propagation of the Faith) in Rome from 1897 to 1902. On his return, he continued teaching at St. Francis Xavier University and became the vice-rector in 1907.

Working closely with the Carnegie Corporation, he implemented various reform and modernization programs, culminating in an unsuccessful attempt to amalgamate various sectarian and non-sectarian colleges in the Maritime Provinces into one nondenominational university centered around Dalhousie University in Halifax. Although the Roman Catholic Archbishop of Halifax Edward McCarthy supported amalgamation, the Catholic Bishop of Antigonish James Morrison successfully opposed it and eventually exiled Tompkins to the tiny fishing village of Canso, Nova Scotia as parish priest for Canso, Little Dover and Queensport.

As parish priest Tompkins observed firsthand the plight of the poor fishing community there and helped organize and lead what would become the Antigonish Movement of cooperative fisheries, stores, housing projects, and adult study groups. The Antigonish Movement was eventually institutionalized in the form of the Extension Department at St. Francis Xavier, which was headed by Tompkins' double-cousin Father Moses Coady and which included Father Hugh MacPherson, A.B. MacDonald and others.

== Career highlights ==
- 1895, Graduates from St. Francis Xavier University
- 1897-1902, Attends Urban College in Rome
- 24 May 1902 Ordained in the Lateran Basilica, Rome by Pietro, Cardinal Respighi
- 1902 Rejoins staff at St. Francis Xavier University, Antigonish
- 1907-1908, vice-rector, St. FX
- 1908-1923, vice-president and prefect of studies, St. FX
- 1919, Awarded an honorary Doctor of Laws degree by Dalhousie University
- 1 January 1923, becomes parish priest (pastor) of Star of the Sea (then called Stella Maris) Church, Canso, including the towns of Little Dover and Queensport
- 10 October 1934, becomes chaplain at Bethany, the motherhouse of the Sisters of Saint Martha, Antigonish
- 10 March 1935-23 December 1948, parish priest of St. Joseph's Church, Reserve Mines, Cape Breton
- 1948 Retires due to ill health and lives at St Martha's Convent in Margaree Forks, Nova Scotia.
- 5 May 1953, Dies at St. Martha's Hospital and is buried in Reserve Mines.

== Biographies ==
- Jim Lotz and Michael R. Welton, Father Jimmy: Life and Times of Father Jimmy Tompkins (1997), ISBN 1-895415-23-3
- George Boyle, Father Tompkins of Nova Scotia (1953)
