= Credit union =

Member-owned financial cooperative

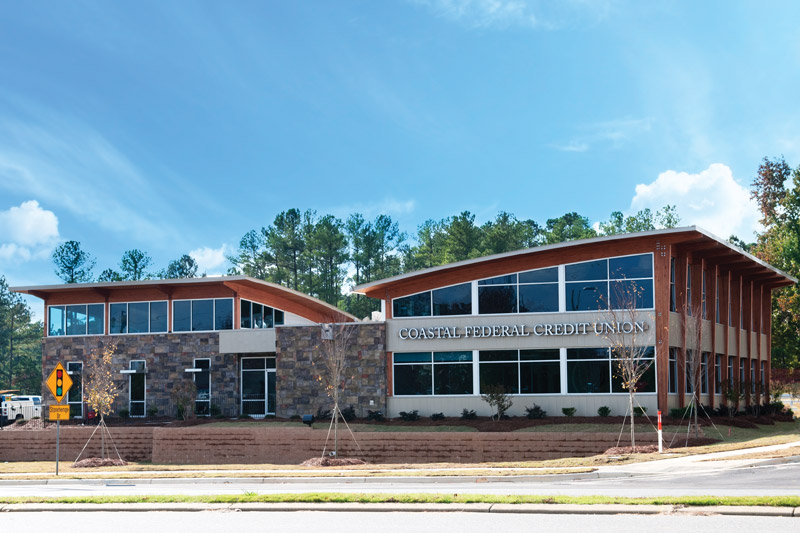
A branch of the Coastal Federal Credit Union in Raleigh, North Carolina, US

A credit union is a member-owned nonprofit cooperative financial institution. It may offer financial services equivalent to those of commercial banks, such as share accounts (savings accounts), share draft accounts (checking accounts), credit cards, credit, share term certificates (certificates of deposit), and online banking. Normally, only a member of a credit union may deposit or borrow money. In several African countries, a credit union is commonly referred to as a SACCO ("savings and credit co-operative").

Worldwide, credit union systems vary significantly in their total assets and average institution asset size, ranging from volunteer operations with a handful of members to institutions with hundreds of thousands of members and assets worth billions of US dollars. At the end of 2024, the World Council of Credit Unions reported 412.7 million members in 67,137 credit unions across 101 countries, with more than US$3.8 trillion in total assets. The organization reports only figures supplied by countries responding to its annual survey, and it does not estimate values for non-reporting countries.

In 2006, 23.6% of mortgages from commercial banks were subprime lending, compared to only 3.6% of those from credit unions; banks were two and a half times more likely to fail during the 2008 financial crisis. American credit unions more than doubled their lending to small businesses between 2008 and 2016, from $30 billion to $60 billion, while lending to small businesses overall during the same period declined by around $100 billion. In the US, public trust in credit unions stands at 60%, compared to 30% for big banks. Moreover, small businesses are 80% more likely to be satisfied with a credit union than with a big bank.

Natural-person credit unions (also called "retail credit unions" or "consumer credit unions") serve individuals, as distinguished from corporate credit unions, which serve other credit unions.

== Differences from other financial institutions ==
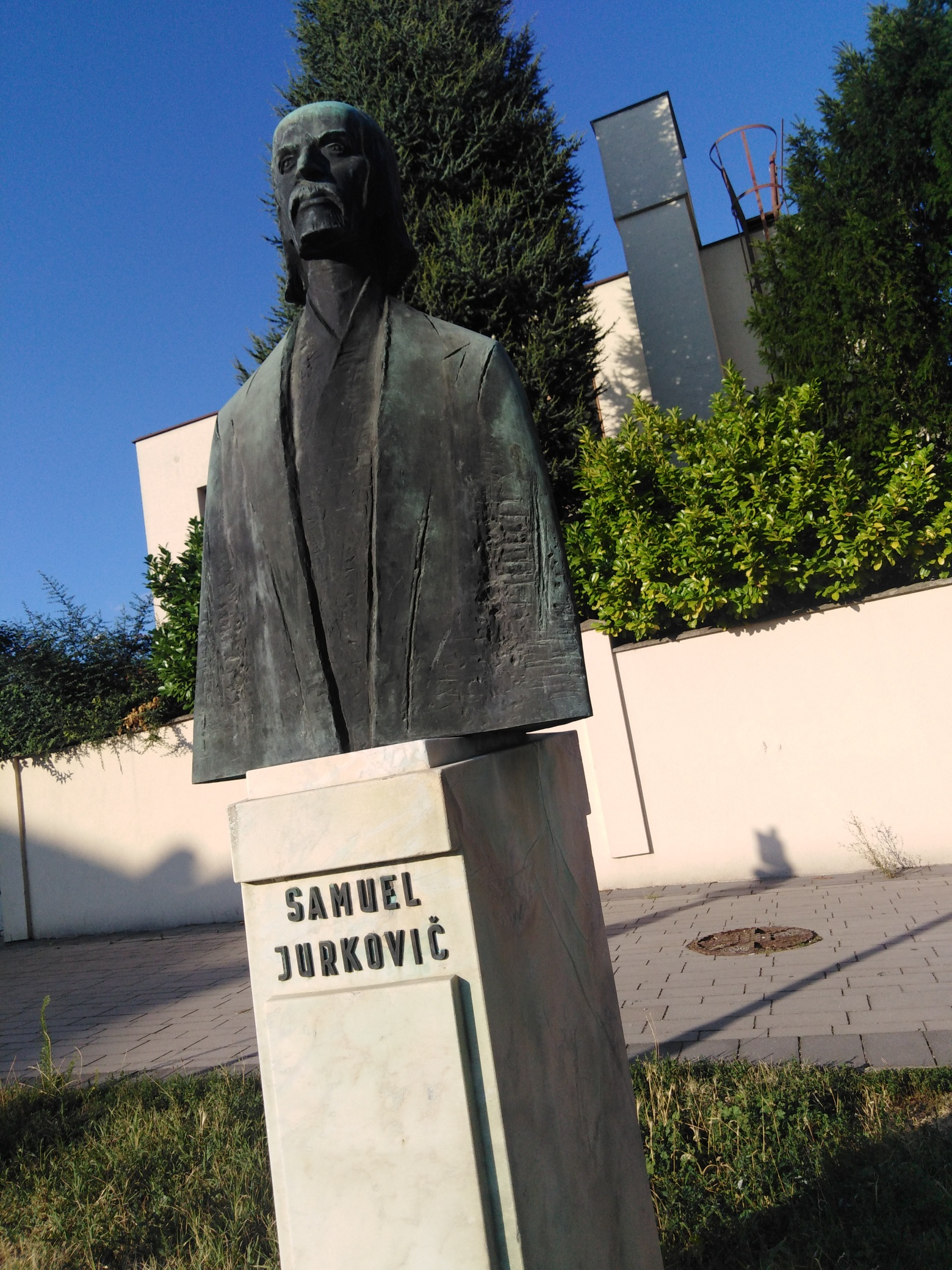
Statue of Samuel Jurkovič in Rača, Bratislava, Slovakia. He founded Spolok Gazdovský, the first cooperative (or credit union) in Central Europe.

Credit unions differ from banks and other financial institutions in that people who have accounts in the credit union are its members and owners. They also elect their board of directors in a one-person-one-vote system, regardless of the amounts they might have invested. Credit unions generally see themselves as different from mainstream banks, with a mission to be community-oriented and "serve people, not profit".

Surveys of customers at banks and credit unions have consistently shown higher satisfaction ratings with the quality of service at credit unions. Credit unions have historically claimed to provide superior member service and to be committed to helping members improve their financial situation. In the context of financial inclusion, credit unions claim to provide a broader range of loan and savings products at a lower cost to their members than at most microfinance institutions.

Credit unions differ from modern microfinance institutions. In particular, members' control over financial resources is the feature that distinguishes the cooperative model from modern microfinance. The dominant model of microfinance—whether it is provided by not-for-profit or for-profit institutions—places control over financial resources and their allocation in the hands of a small number of microfinance providers that benefit from the highly profitable sector.

== Not-for-profit status ==
In the context of credit unions, a not-for-profit organization must be distinguished from a charity. Credit unions are not-for-profit because their purpose is to serve members rather than to maximize profits. Therefore, unlike charities, credit unions do not rely on donations; they are financial institutions that must make what is, in economic terms, a small profit (i.e., in nonprofit accounting terms, a surplus) to survive. According to the World Council of Credit Unions (WOCCU), a credit union's revenues (from loans and investments) must exceed its operating expenses and dividends (interest paid on deposits) in order to maintain capital and solvency.

In the United States, credit unions that are incorporated and operated under a state credit union law are tax-exempt under Section 501(c)(14)(A) of the Internal Revenue Code. Federal credit unions that are organized and operated in accordance with the Federal Credit Union Act are tax-exempt under Section 501(c)(1) of the same code.

== Global presence ==
According to WOCCU, at the end of 2018, there were 85,400 credit unions in 118 countries. Collectively, these credit unions served 274.2 million members and held US$2.19 trillion in assets. WOCCU excludes data from cooperative banks; therefore, some countries generally regarded as the pioneers of credit unionism—such as Germany, France, the Netherlands, and Italy—are sometimes excluded from the data. The European Association of Co-operative Banks reported 38 million members in those four countries at the end of 2010.

The countries with the most credit union activity are diverse. According to WOCCU, the countries with the greatest number of credit union members were the United States (101 million), India (20 million), Canada (10 million), Brazil (6.0 million), South Korea (5.7 million), the Philippines (5.4 million), Kenya and Mexico (5.1 million each), Ecuador (4.8 million), Australia (4.5 million), Thailand (4.1 million), Colombia (3.6 million), and Ireland (3.3 million).

The countries with the highest percentage of credit union members in the economically active population were Barbados (82%), Ireland (75%), Grenada (72%), Trinidad and Tobago (68%), Belize and Saint Lucia (67% each), Saint Kitts and Nevis (58%), Jamaica (53% each), Antigua and Barbuda (49%), the United States (48%), Ecuador (47%), and Canada (43%). Several African and Latin American countries also had high rates of credit union membership, as did Australia and South Korea. The average percentage for all countries considered in the WOCCU report was 8.2%. Credit unions were launched in Poland in 1992; as of 2012, the country had 2,000 credit union branches with 2.2 million members. From 1996 to 2016, credit unions in Costa Rica almost tripled their share of the financial market (they grew from 3.7% of the market to 9.9%), and they grew faster than private-sector banks or state-owned banks there, after financial reforms in the country.

== History ==
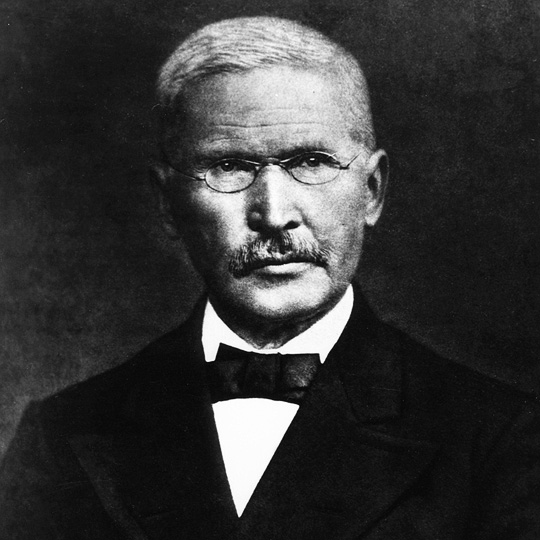
Friedrich Wilhelm Raiffeisen founded the first rural credit unions in Germany.

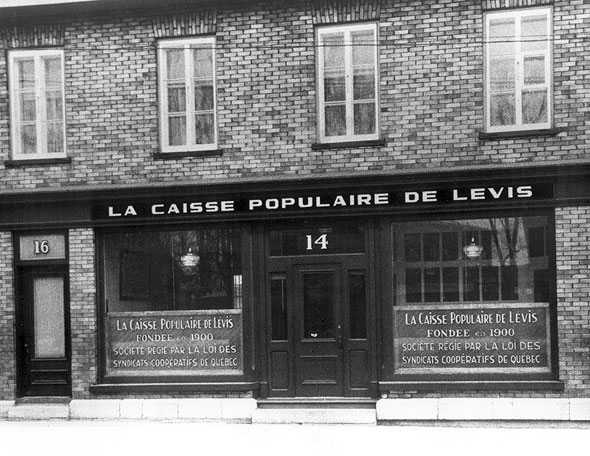
A caisse populaire credit union in Lévis, Quebec, Canada, c. 1920

Spolok Gazdovský (The Association of Administrators, or The Association of Farmers), founded in 1845 by Samuel Jurkovič, was the first cooperative financial institution in Europe. The cooperative provided cheap loans from funds generated by regular savings for its members. Members were required to commit to a moral life and to plant two trees in a public place each year. Despite the association's brief existence (until 1851), it formed the basis of the cooperative movement in Slovakia. Slovak intellectual Ľudovít Štúr said about the association: "We would very much like such excellent constitutions to be established throughout our region. They would help to rescue people from evil and misery. A beautiful, great idea, a beautiful excellent constitution!"

Modern credit union history dates from 1852, when the politician and economist Franz Hermann Schulze-Delitzsch consolidated the learning from two pilot projects—one in Eilenburg and the other in Delitzsch in the Kingdom of Saxony—into what are generally recognized as the first credit unions in the world. He went on to develop a highly successful urban credit union system. In 1864, the mayor Friedrich Wilhelm Raiffeisen founded the first rural credit union in Heddesdorf (now part of the town of Neuwied) in Germany. By the time of Raiffeisen's death in 1888, credit unions had spread to Italy, France, the Netherlands, England, Austria, and other nations.

The first credit union in North America, the Caisse Populaire Lévis in Quebec, Canada, began operating on 23 January 1901 with a 10-cent deposit. Founder Alphonse Desjardins, a reporter in the Canadian parliament, was prompted to act in 1897, when he learned of a Montrealer who had been ordered by the court to pay nearly C$5,000 in interest on a loan of C$150 from a moneylender. Drawing on European precedents, Desjardins developed a distinctive parish-based model for Quebec: the caisse populaire.

In the United States, St. Mary's Bank Credit Union in Manchester, New Hampshire, was the first credit union. Supported by a personal visit by Desjardins, St. Mary's was founded by French-speaking immigrants to Manchester from Quebec on 24 November 1908. Several Little Canada communities around New England formed similar credit unions, often out of necessity, because Anglo-American banks frequently rejected Franco-American loans. America's Credit Union Museum currently occupies the location of the home from which St. Mary's Bank Credit Union first operated. In November 1910, the Woman's Educational and Industrial Union set up the Industrial Credit Union, modeled on the Desjardins credit unions; it was the first non-faith-based community credit union serving all people in the greater Boston area. The oldest statewide credit union in the United States was established in 1913: St. Mary's Credit Union in Massachusetts serves any resident of the state.

After being promoted by the Catholic Church during the 1940s to assist poor people in Latin America, credit unions expanded rapidly during the 1950s and 1960s—especially in Bolivia, Costa Rica, the Dominican Republic, Honduras, and Peru. The Regional Confederation of Latin American Credit Unions (COLAC) was formed; with funding from the Inter-American Development Bank, credit unions in the region grew rapidly through the 1970s and into the early 1980s. By 1988, COLAC credit unions represented four million members across 17 countries, with a loan portfolio of about US$0.5 billion. However, from the late 1970s onward, many Latin American credit unions struggled with inflation, stagnating membership, and serious loan recovery problems. During the 1980s, donor agencies, such as the United States Agency for International Development (USAID), attempted to rehabilitate Latin American credit unions; the agencies did so by providing technical assistance and focusing credit unions' efforts on mobilizing deposits from the local population. In 1987, the Latin American debt crisis caused bank runs on credit unions. Significant withdrawals and high default rates caused liquidity problems for many credit unions in the region.

== Stability and risks ==
Credit unions and banks in most jurisdictions are required by law to meet a reserve requirement of assets to liabilities. If a credit union or traditional bank is unable to maintain positive cash flow and/or is forced to declare insolvency, its assets are distributed to creditors (including depositors) in order of seniority according to bankruptcy law. If the total deposits exceed the assets remaining after more senior creditors are paid, all depositors will lose some or all of their initial deposits. However, many jurisdictions have deposit insurance that promises to reimburse members for funds lost up to a certain threshold. Examples include the National Credit Union Administration's Share Insurance Fund and the Canada Deposit Insurance Corporation.

== Corporate ==
Credit unions provide services only to individual consumers. Corporate credit unions (also known as central credit unions in Canada) provide services to credit unions, in the form of operational support, funds clearing, and product and service delivery.

== Leagues and associations ==
Credit unions often form cooperatives among themselves to provide services for members. A credit union service organization (CUSO) is generally a for-profit subsidiary of one or more credit unions formed for this purpose. For example, CO-OP Financial Services, the largest credit-union-owned interbank network in the United States, provides an ATM network and shared branching services to credit unions. Other examples of cooperatives among credit unions include credit counseling services, as well as insurance and investment services.

State credit union leagues can partner with outside organizations to promote initiatives for credit unions or customers. For example, the Indiana Credit Union League sponsors—together with the Filene Research Institute—an initiative called "Ignite", which is used to encourage innovation in the credit union industry.

The Credit Union National Association (CUNA) is a national trade association for both state- and federally chartered credit unions located in the United States. The National Credit Union Foundation is the primary charitable arm of the United States' credit union movement, as well as an affiliate of CUNA.

The National Association of Federally-Insured Credit Unions (NAFCU) is a national trade association for all state- and federally chartered credit unions. Based outside Washington, D.C., NAFCU's mission is to provide all credit unions with federal advocacy, compliance assistance, and education.

The World Council of Credit Unions (WOCCU) is both a trade association for credit unions worldwide and a development agency. WOCCU's mission is to "assist its members and potential members to organize, expand, improve and integrate credit unions and related institutions as effective instruments for the economic and social development of all people".

== Deposit insurance ==
In the United States, federal credit unions are chartered and overseen by the National Credit Union Administration (NCUA), which also provides deposit insurance much as the Federal Deposit Insurance Corporation (FDIC) does for banks. State-chartered credit unions are overseen by a state's financial regulatory agency; they may, but are not required to, obtain deposit insurance. Because of past problems with bank failures, no state provides deposit insurance; therefore, there are two primary sources for deposit insurance—the NCUA and American Share Insurance (ASI), a private insurer based in Ohio.

In Canada, the majority of credit unions and caisses populaires are provincially incorporated, and deposit insurance is provided by a provincial Crown corporation. For example, in Ontario, up to C$250,000 of eligible deposits with credit unions is insured by the Financial Services Regulatory Authority of Ontario. Federal credit unions, such as the UNI Financial Cooperation caisse in New Brunswick, are incorporated under federal charters and belong to the Canada Deposit Insurance Corporation.

In the United Kingdom, credit unions are covered by the Financial Services Compensation Scheme as banks and building societies (cooperative banks) are, and deposits are protected up to £85,000 per consumer and institution.

== See also ==
- Bond of association
- Consumers' cooperative
- Cooperative banking
- Capital market
- Community federal credit union
- Deposit account
- Democratic member control (cooperatives)
- History of credit unions
- Humanomics
- Labour Bank
- Credit unions in Canada
- Credit unions in the United Kingdom
- Credit unions in the United States
