= Antigonish Movement =

Community development organization in Canada

The Antigonish Movement blended adult education, co-operatives, microfinance and rural community development to help small, resource-based communities around Canada's Maritimes to improve their economic and social circumstances. A group of priests and educators, including Father Jimmy Tompkins, Father Moses Coady, Rev. Hugh MacPherson and A.B. MacDonald led this movement from a base at the Extension Department at St. Francis Xavier University (St. F.X.) in Antigonish, Nova Scotia.

The credit union systems of Nova Scotia, New Brunswick and PEI owe their origins to the Antigonish Movement, which also had an important influence on other provincial systems across Canada. The Coady International Institute at St. F.X. has been instrumental in developing credit unions and in asset-based community development initiatives in developing countries ever since.

== Goals ==
As educators and priests, the leaders of the Antigonish Movement were primarily concerned with human and spiritual development. The title of Moses Coady's only book – Masters of Their Own Destiny – encapsulates this desire to see ordinary Nova Scotians achieve economic and social freedom.

However, Coady argued that for practical reasons "we consider it good pedagogy and good psychology, to begin with the economic phase ... that we may more readily attain the spiritual and cultural towards which all our efforts are directed."

Ordinary Nova Scotians he argued, had only themselves to blame for their poverty and vulnerability. They had permitted money and business to become mysterious forces outside of their control. Fishers and farmers for example, were exploited by marketing middlemen. Everyone was exploited by the usury of moneylenders. If they took the time to understand their circumstances and took the risks of co-operative action, they could achieve economic security and on that foundation greater freedom and self-realization. In a vision that has been renewed today in digital forms of mass collaboration, Coady argued that "the only hope of democracy is that enough noble, independent, energetic souls may be found who are prepared to work overtime, without pay" in order to shape a free and prosperous society.

== Origins ==
The origins of co-operatives in Nova Scotia go back to a cooperative store in Stellarton, founded in 1861. Co-operative creameries and fruit-growers co-ops were established by farmers to free them from exploitative middleman in the 1890s. Many early co-ops failed due to "poor management, domination by a few individuals and a lack of ongoing education."

However, the British Canadian Co-operative Society, a co-op store in Sydney Mines, Nova Scotia, set an example of sound co-operation. By 1917 it has 1,220 members and over $500,000 in sales. That year, it organized a conference on co-ops. The conference, which featured Ontario co-operative pioneer George Keen as keynote speaker, renewed local energy and enthusiasm for the idea.

Adult education was the spirit of the movement, and Coady credits Dr. Hugh MacPherson and Rev. Jimmy Tompkins at St. F.X. with their early roles as "pioneer extension workers at the University interested in both adult education and economic cooperation."

== Jimmy Tompkins ==
Father Jimmy Tompkins played a key role in concocting the "intellectual dynamite" that was later set off in almost every village in the Maritimes.

Tompkins began teaching at St. F.X. in 1902. As vice-president of the university, he attended the Conference of British Empire Universities in London, England in 1912, and returned filled with ideas for ways that the university could become more involved in solving rural economic problems through adult education. British Workers Educational Associations, the Danish Folk High Schools, and Swedish Study Circles particularly interested him. And in Canada, the University of Saskatchewan's agricultural program, and Quebec's agricultural colleges and credit unions, caught his attention.

Tompkins had trouble making his case with the university's administration, and in 1922, St. F.X. sent Tompkins into "exile" as village priest in Canso, Nova Scotia. This did not slow the determined priest down, however. His approach to adult education in Canso triggered local action and a series of articles in The Halifax Chronicle which helped trigger a federal commission into the problems of the Maritime fisheries.

Beginning in 1924 Tompkins organized the first of a series of annual conferences bringing together farmers, educators, students, priests and rural development experts. In 1928, seeking a more permanent organization, some of the leaders in this group launched a campaign that raised $100,000. This initiative, combined with the report of federal commission on the fisheries in 1928, prompted St. F.X. to support the formation of an Extension Department in 1928.

== Moses Coady ==
Moses Coady is generally credited with transforming the vision of his cousin Tompkins into an effective program capable of spreading across the Maritimes.

The defining moment in Coady's career came when he testified before a Canadian government commission in 1927. Drawing on his own experience and that of other movement leaders he maintained that the local economy could be revitalized if the right type of learning was cultivated in ordinary people: especially critical thinking, scientific methods of planning and production, and co-operative entrepreneurship.

The report of the MacLean Commission was catalytic: in late 1928 St. F.X. organized an Extension Department to carry adult education to the people of the province, appointing Coady as its first director. The Canadian Department of Fisheries asked Coady to help the government "organize the fishermen".

Coady also invested considerable energy in catalyzing and strengthening wholesale co-operatives around the Maritimes: including the United Maritime Fishermen, the United Fruit Companies and the Canadian Livestock Co-operatives (Maritimes).

== Adult education in action ==
The Antigonish program of adult education employed three main components:

- the mass meeting,
- the study club, and
- the school for leaders.

=== Mass meetings ===
The field staff of the Extension Department worked with local people to organize meetings in schools, churches, and community centres.

People who heard Coady speak at these meetings described his speeches as "fiery" and "energizing". Coady challenged his audience not to accept their poverty but to take action to understand their situation, and then to think and to plan to change it. As he said many times, "You can get the good life. You're poor enough to want it and smart enough to get it." He would propose that they set up study clubs and that those who could read help those who could not.

=== Study clubs ===
Study clubs typically met in members' homes, with the goal of understanding the factors keeping the members poor, to identify solutions, make plans, and take action. The Extension Department provided pamphlets and technical material on matters like agricultural methods, business organization, economics, and co-operative principles. The clubs studied local newspaper articles and any other materials that could help them understand their situation better.

The leaders and ideas emerging from this process often carried it into the next stage – organizing co-operatives and taking other initiatives to solve local problems.

The Extension Department linked the study clubs together through a network called the Associated Study Clubs, which facilitated information sharing and capitalized on the building momentum.

=== School for leaders ===
Once the first co-operatives began, the Extension Department organized a six-week program at the university with courses in co-operative business, book-keeping, mathematics, economics, public speaking, and citizenship.

The program was taught by successful co-operative leaders from around the province. The goal was to reduce the risks of business failure, and to invigorate the momentum in each community with fresh ideas.

The program was taken to the villages by Coady and A.B. MacDonald. Roy Bergengren, director of Credit Union National of America, dedicated his book, Credit Union North America to A.B. MacDonald, who he describes as "an extraordinary organizer and an inspired leader who is known in every city, town and fishing hamlet throughout the length and breadth of the province". MacDonald went on to direct the Nova Scotia Credit Union League and then the Co-operative Union of Canada.

== Co-operative development ==
Coady's biographer Jim Lotz gives an example of how the link between the Antigonish approach, community development and co-operatives worked in the village of Judique, Nova Scotia.

In 1932, the people of Judique formed 12 study clubs. Two years later they built a lobster factory. Canned lobsters brought better returns than fresh groundfish that had to be sold to buyers on the wharf for any price they cared to offer. The 30 members of the Judique lobster co-op paid off the cost of their factory in two years. They built another one, then opened a credit union and co-op shop. The residents of the community told Coady's staff that they were "much richer than we were a decade ago, both economically and spiritually. We have gained much confidence in ourselves through directing and managing our own affairs.

By 1932 the Extension Department had sparked the formation of 179 study clubs with 1,500 members in Nova Scotia. Over the next six years, during the height of Coady and MacDonald's work in the villages, the number of study clubs rose to 1,110 with 10,000 participants.

By 1938 these study clubs had formed 142 credit unions, 39 co-operative stores, 17 co-operative lobster factories, 11 co-operative fish plants, and 11 other co-ops.

"Perhaps the most important reason why the Antigonish movement was able to have a significant, lasting impact was its promotion of credit unions." The farmers, fishers, and miners who formed the backbone of the movement had little access to credit before the Great Depression, and lost what little they had as the downturn started to bite. With the help of Roy Bergengren and the American credit union movement, Nova Scotia passed the first sound credit union legislation in English Canada in 1932.

== From Nova Scotia to the world ==
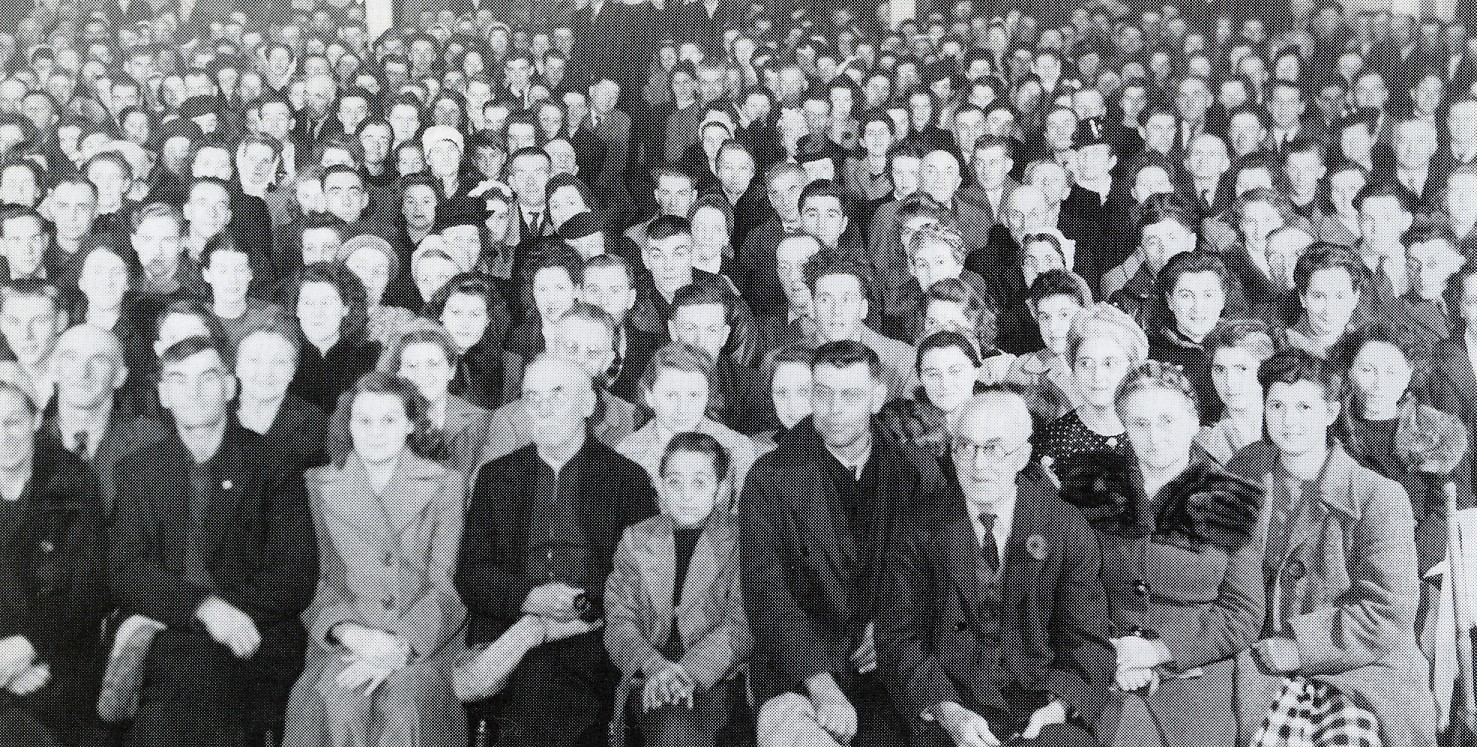
The conference of the cooperative movement in Chéticamp, Nova Scotia (Canada)

From its start in 1928, the Extension Department at St. Francis Xavier University was concerned with spreading its message well beyond Nova Scotia. It was particularly concerned about the other provinces in the Maritimes.

For example, by 1936 there were 200 study clubs operating in New Brunswick, and the legislature passed a credit union law that year. Wilfred Keohan, the New Brunswick Registrar of Credit Unions, wrote in 1939 that "There can be no doubt but that the experience in Nova Scotia had a marked influence as credit union enthusiasm knows no frontiers. The crystallized demand came from such bodies as the New Brunswick Council of Labour, the Trades & Labour Council, the Farmer's and Dairyman's Association, fishermen's organizations and members of the clergy who saw in credit unions an economic regeneration of their flocks." By 1939 ten thousand members were participating in 95 credit unions (including caisses populaires) in the province.

By 1936 Coady and MacDonald were increasingly traveling beyond the Maritimes to Ontario, Saskatchewan and British Columbia, where their speeches and ideas helped ignite local credit union movements. After Nova Scotia passed a credit union law in 1932, New Brunswick and PEI were the next to pass legislation (1936). By 1939 every province in Canada had a credit union movement and a legal framework to guide it.

Bergengren wrote in 1940 that "out of the Nova Scotia experience has come a new and most valuable study club technique that will have a far reaching effect on the whole future of the credit union movement." He credited the rapid expansion of credit unions to other provinces across Canada to the Antigonish movement.

The Board of Governors of St. Francis Xavier University established The Coady International Institute to honour Moses Coady less than six months after his death. The institute has played a role in the emergence of credit unions throughout the world, especially in Africa. Since then, over 7,000 community development practitioners from over 120 countries have studied at the campus in Antigonish.

== Criticisms ==
By the end of World War II the credit unions and co-operatives of the Maritimes were an acknowledged success, gaining international recognition. The study clubs for which the movement was noted declined however, and attention had shifted from human emancipation towards building stronger, more professional institutions. "Most of the educational attainment in the war and its aftermath focused on training elite managers for the co-operative institutions. Evidence from the co-operative reports of the 1940s indicates clearly that the common people were not participating very much in the life of their institutions."

Like many of the integrated rural development programs in the developing world today, the Antigonish Movement encountered a grass-roots challenge to its vision in the implementation stage. In the end, the grand vision of fishers and miners appreciating Shakespeare and grand opera seemed to usually lead to one community project: co-operative microfinance through credit unions.

Ian MacPherson, a co-operative historian and theorist, argues that most co-operative movements are dependent for their early impetus on the support of networks of external players like church groups, government departments or wealthy patrons. As the movement begins to transform into a credit union system, "... necessary managerial and technical changes may be inhibited by the "founders": revered individuals who have made great contributions but who, as they age and the institution they helped found develops, may hold back necessary change and new generations of leadership."

Nova Scotia's credit union system, springing from the centre of the Antigonish Movement, has a far lower penetration of members (18%) than systems in neighbouring New Brunswick (41%) and Prince Edward Island (45%).

Coady acknowledged that the credit unions were promoting thrift and household budgeting, and showing members by example how much money they could bring to bear on their communities' problems through co-operative action. But to him, the main purpose of credit unions was moral. The credit union "makes people honest". "There have been a few instances of dishonest managers and some slow borrowers, but the credit union organization takes care of these cases."

In other parts of Canada, most notably Quebec, Saskatchewan and Manitoba where some of the strongest credit union systems emerged, the movement's early leaders recognized the need to address practical problems that emerged from increased demand for credit unions. Innovations such as the Saskatchewan Mutual Aid Board, which focused on protecting members‘ savings, were grounded in addressing members‘ practical needs and sustained institutional growth.

== Legacy ==
The study club successfully addressed one of the enduring challenges of co-operative development. Co-operative enterprises address the principal–agent problem by making all enterprise users into owners. When users accept the duties of owners, this structure results in strong governance and control systems. However, assets in co-operative enterprises are vulnerable when the users aren't prepared to accept duties of ownership. In a paper for the Food and Agriculture Organization of the United Nations in 1962, Alexander Laidlaw, a co-operative leader who served as a director at the Extension Department, wrote that:

... such concepts as group responsibility, reaching decisions by majority vote, delegating authority to responsible officers, observing rules agreed upon by the group, exerting self-discipline for the welfare of the group cannot be taught or learned in the abstract. They must become part of the personality of the individual and the experience of the group through actual situations.

Antigonish-style study clubs, unlike traditional seminars or workshops, require all members to collectively manage a group process even before they launch a co-operative. Members can take a hard look at each other's capabilities and weigh their collective prospects with a clear head while they learn the skills they need to launch community ventures.

By the end of World War II a series of leaders from Friedrich Wilhelm Raiffeisen to Edward Filene to Alphonse Desjardins to Moses Coady had shown that cooperative movements could reach and empower poor populations in a way that deepened the economic gains of capitalism while alleviating some of its undesirable social effects. This prepared the way for a wave of 'anti-communist' co-operative development led by the US government in the developing world in the 1940-1960s. For precisely the reasons just noted, however, the results of this 'state-led' credit union development were mixed at best.

The philosophy and techniques of Antigonish anticipated some of the key ideas of rural development, including the emancipatory pedagogy of Paulo Freire, and the philosophy of Robert Chambers/participatory rural assessment. However, the Antigonish approach runs into significant problems in oral communities and those with anti-democratic traditions. This has limited the replicability of the movement, and led to significant offshoots, such as the self-help group movement in India, village banking and the ASCA movement in parts of Africa.

Through its leadership programs, Coady International Institute continues to promote and support people-owned institutions around the world. The idea of 'collectives' managing their finances or enterprises has taken many new shapes in modern times.

Self-Help Groups (SHGs) are small groups each consisting of 10-20 members, mostly women. SHGs are popular and widespread particularly in India with an estimated 110 million members; another similar small group, managed system? Village Savings and Loan Association (VSLAs) have become popular particularly across Africa with over 10 million members. These small group-managed and governed financial services are similar in idea to the Study Clubs of Antigonish movement, and avoid possible negative outcomes of Credit Unions becoming more corporate and moving away from members' active participation and control. These small group models are popular among women, perhaps as they face barriers in joining even the local cooperatives with men as dominant members. These informal groups have become popular, often coming together to form 'federations' for greater collective bargaining power and reaching economies of scale, essentially becoming and behaving like formal cooperatives.

Non-financial cooperatives - such as fishermen coop or farmers coops of the Antigonish movement, continue to provide an alternative economic model the world over despite rise of private sector led economic growth, especially for small producers and farmers in accessing markets and negotiating prices collectively. Within Maritimes though, such cooperatives seem to have given way to more individual enterprises that operate more as 'association' rather than collective business, but continuing to have a very close sense of 'community' and collective identity - be it lobster fishers or dairy farmers. Newer form of economic enterprises of recent times are also generally termed as 'social enterprises' - with dual objective of profit and socially responsible and positive outcomes. Such enterprises don't always have collective ownership, but almost always have a sense of 'community' well-being. Investment Cooperatives are yet another form of collective enterprise, often getting formed to finance a community based enterprise such as alternative energy coop or local-food marketing coop. Shared-economy is yet another form of new wave idea that borrows from same coop principle of community sharing an economy more inclusively; though the potential conflict between the private and corporate profit v/s community benefiting collectively continues to be an ongoing debate; a debate that Antigonish Movement challenged in 1920 and 1930s, and seem to go through in cyclical fashion ever-since. Societies are once again at cross-roads for balancing between individual and corporate wealth, group / cooperative enterprises, and more shared-economies where everyone can share benefits. Legacy and lessons from the Antigonish Movement continue to be relevant in our modern times.

== Timeline ==
- 1891 Pope Leo XIII issues encyclical Rerum novarum advocating Christian associations of workingmen for economic improvement
- 1890s-1900s Co-operative stores, co-operative creameries and fruit-growing co-ops established around Nova Scotia
- 1906 Formation of the British Canadian Co-operative Society in Sydney Mines, Nova Scotia
- 1912 Tompkins gains key contacts and ideas at the Conference of British Empire Universities
- 1917 British Canadian co-operative store in Sydney Mines organizes a conference on co-ops in Nova Scotia, sparking renewed interest
- 1921 Father Jimmy Tompkins publishes Knowledge for the People, an appeal to St. Francis Xavier University to implement a program of adult education
- 1922 St. FX loses patience with Tompkins and sends him into "exile" to Canso, Nova Scotia as parish priest
- 1924 George Keen, president of the Co-operative Union of Canada, visits Tompkins in Canso and advises him on co-operative development
- Summer of 1927 Father Jimmy's work in Canso, Nova Scotia is featured in The Halifax Chronicle
- May 1928 a Canadian government commission advocates adult education as part of a strategy to save the Maritime fisheries
- November 1928 St. Francis Xavier University sets up adult education Extension Department and asks Father Moses Coady to be the Director
- October 29, 1929 stock market crash precipitates economic collapse around the Maritimes
- December 10, 1932 first credit union in Nova Scotia launched in Broad Cove
- 1933 first School for Leaders at St. Francis Xavier University
- 1938 formation of Credit Union Central of Nova Scotia (A.B. MacDonald, Director)
- Sept. 1944 A.B. MacDonald leaves for Ottawa to lead the Co-operative Union of Canada
- 1952 Death of A.B. MacDonald
- 1953 Death of Father Jimmy Tompkins
- July 28, 1959 Death of Moses Michael Coady

== See also ==
- Community economic development
- History of credit unions
- Participatory rural appraisal
- Popular education

== Bibliography ==
- Alexander, Anne M. The Antigonish Movement: Moses Coady and Adult Education Today, Thompson Educational Publishing, Toronto, 1997.
- Bergengren, Roy F. Credit Union North America. Southern Publishers Inc., New York, 1940.
- Coady, Moses M. Masters of Their Own Destiny: The Story of the Antigonish Movement of Adult Education Through Economic Cooperation. Harper & Brothers, New York, 1939.
- Delaney, Ida. By Their Own Hands: A Fieldworker's Account of the Antigonish Movement. Lancelot Press, Nova Scotia, 1985.
- Dodaro, Santo, and Leonard Pluta. The Big Picture: The Antigonish Movement of Eastern Nova Scotia. McGill-Queen's University Press, Montréal, 2012.
- Lewack, Harold.The quiet revolution, a study of the Antigonish Movement. (SLID research tract #4)
- Laidlaw, Alexander. Training and extension in the co-operative movement: a guide for fieldmen and extension workers. Agricultural Development Paper #74, Food and Agriculture Organization of the UN, Rome, 1962.
- Laidlaw, Alexander (ed.). The Man From Margaree: Writings & Speeches of M. M. Coady, Educator/Reformer/Priest. McClelland & Steward, Toronto, 1971.
- Lotz, Jim. The Humble Giant: Moses Coady, Canada's Rural Revolutionary. Novalis, Ottawa, 2005
- Lotz, Jim and Michael R. Welton. Father Jimmy: Life and Times of Jimmy Tompkins. Breton Books, Wreck Cove, Nova Scotia, 1997. ISBN 1-895415-23-3
- MacPherson, Ian. Building and Protecting the Co-operative Movement: A Brief History of the Co-operative Union of Canada, 1909-84. Co-operative Union of Canada, Ottawa, n.d.
- MacPherson, Ian. Hands Around the Globe: A History of the International Credit Union Movement and the Role and Development of World Council of Credit Unions, Inc. Horsdal & Schubart Publishers & WOCCU, Victoria, Canada 1999.
- Stefanson, Brenda Gail. Adult Educators in Co-operative Development: agents of change. Centre for the Study of Co-operatives, University of Saskatchewan, Saskatoon, 2002.
